= Crazy Baldhead Sound System =

- Also known as: The Slackers
- Origin: New York City, New York, United States
- Genre: Reggae
- Years active: 1997 - Present
- Spinoff of: The Slackers
- Members: Jayson "Agent Jay" Nugent; Victor Rice; Eddie Ocampo; Ara Babajian; Victor Ruggiero; Victor Axelrod aka Ticklah

Crazy Baldhead is a side project of The Slackers headed by Jayson "Agent Jay" Nugent. Crazy Baldhead plays an innovative style of music that mixed reggae, ska, dub, rock and dancehall. Members of the band include Eddie Ocampo, Victor Rice, Vic Ruggiero, Dave Hillyard and Glen Pine.

Since 1997, Nugent has been a staple in the New York City ska community and the band released their first album in 2004. The shifting collective also feature popular reggae artists such as Victor Rice, King Django, Rocker T and Buford O'Sullivan. In 2007, Nugent released Crazy Baldhead Has a Posse, which he produced over a 10-year period, featuring guest musicians in every song. Other bands That featured Nugent's guitar work in the 1990s includes: Agent 99, Stubborn All-Stars, Da Whole Thing and Version City Rockers.

In 2008, Crazy Baldhead released The Sound of '69, an album which reflects Agent Jay's take on rock music from 1969, covering influential bands such as the Beatles, James Brown, Johnny Cash, the Stooges and the Rolling Stones. These re-interpretations of pop hits from 1969 are played in the style of Jamaican music of the time - that is, the raw, funk-influenced early reggae, often called to as skinhead reggae, championed by producers such as Lee "Scratch" Perry and Harry J.
