= Jeremy Mushlin =

- Also known as: Mush One, DJ Mush1
- Genres: Reggae, Ska, Rocksteady
- Occupation: Musician
- Labels: Hellcat, Moon Ska

Jeremy "Mush One" Mushlin is a trumpeter, composer, engineer, producer, sound system operator, and radio host who has played in reggae, ska, calypso and rocksteady bands, including The Slackers, The Scorchers, Fireproof, The Hungry March Band, Top Shotta Band, Red Hook Warriorz, and The Rocksteady Seven.

== Discography ==
=== With The Slackers ===
- Redlight (1997)
- The Question (1998)
- Live At Ernesto's (2000)
- Wasted Days (2001)

=== With The Scorchers ===
- Stuntin' (2005)

=== With The Rocksteady Seven ===
- Playtime (1999)

=== With Hungry March Band ===
- Running Through With the Sadness (2018)
- Portable Soundtracks for Temporary Utopias (2007)
- Critical Brass (2005)
- On the Waterfront (2002)

=== With Top Shotta Band ===
- Top Shotta Band featuring Screechy Dan (2014)

=== With Sister Nancy ===
- Sister Nancy Meets Fireproof (2001)

=== With Lady Ann ===
- Bad Gyal Inna Dance (2008)
