= The Great Rocksteady Swindle =

Studio album by The Slackers
- Released: April 20, 2010
- Recorded: October 2009
- Genre: Ska
- Length: 53:44
- Label: Hellcat Records

The Slackers chronology
Self Medication (2008)	The Great Rocksteady Swindle (2010)	The Radio (2012)

Professional ratings
Review scores
Source	Rating
AllMusic	3.5/5 stars

The Great Rocksteady Swindle is the twelfth studio album from New York City ska band The Slackers. It was released on April 20, 2010, on Hellcat Records.

The Great Rocksteady Swindle was intended to showcase a more spontaneous, less produced side of the band. The album was recorded in three days in Berlin while the band was on tour. All six members of the band were asked to contribute songs and a total of 25 tracks were recorded, 15 of which appear on the final album. It is the first Slackers album to feature songs written by all the members of the band.

The album title is a reference to the film The Great Rock 'n' Roll Swindle.

== Track listing ==
No.	Title	Writer(s)	Length
1.	"How It Feels"	Ruggiero	3:38
2.	"Because"	Ruggiero	2:52
3.	"Mr. Tragedy"	Babajian	3:40
4.	"Sabina"	Ruggiero, Phil Nerges	4:18
5.	"Cheated"	Babajian, Geard, Hillyard	4:19
6.	"Daddy"	Hillyard	3:10
7.	"A Long Way Off"	Nugent	3:34
8.	"Bo Evil"	Pine	3:01
9.	"Tool Shed"	Geard	3:14
10.	"Ain't No Sunshine"	Bill Withers	3:54
11.	"Don't Look Back"	Ruggiero	4:23
12.	"Anastasia"	Pine	3:51
13.	"Thank You"	Hillyard	2:46
14.	"The TV Dinner Song"	Geard	3:20
15.	"The Same Everyday"	Nugent	3:44

iTunes Deluxe Version Bonus Tracks
No.	Title	Length
16.	"Ain't No Sunshine (Dub Mix) [Bonus Track]"	3:00
17.	"Because Dub (Bonus Track)"	2:58
18.	"Cheated Dub (Bonus Track)"	4:28

== Vinyl track listing ==
=== Side one ===
1. "Cheated"
2. "Because"
3. "A Long Way Off"
4. "The Same Everyday"
5. "Mr. Tragedy (extended)"

=== Side two ===
1. "Bo Evil"
2. "Tool Shed"
3. "Don't Look Back"
4. "How It Feels"
5. "Ain't No Sunshine"
6. "Thank You"

== Personnel ==
=== Players ===
- Ara Babajian – drums
- Marcus Geard – bass
- Dave Hillyard – saxophone
- Jay Nugent – guitar
- Glen Pine – trombone, vocals
- Vic Ruggiero – organ, piano, vocals, harmonica
