= Peculiar (album) =

Studio album by The Slackers
- Released: February 21, 2006
- Recorded: at Ernesto's Club, Sittard, Version City, New Jersey, Coyote Studios
- Genre: Ska
- Length: 48:42
- Label: Hellcat Records
- Producer: Vic Ruggiero; Jeff "King Django" Baker

The Slackers chronology
Close My Eyes (2003)	Peculiar (2006)	The Boss Harmony Sessions (2007)

Professional ratings
Review scores
Source	Rating
AllMusic	4.5/5 stars
Alternative Press	4/5
Drowned in Sound	7/10
MSN Music (Consumer Guide)	(choice cut)
PopMatters	9/10 stars
Punknews.org	4/5 stars
The Skinny	3/5 stars

Peculiar is an album by the New York City ska band The Slackers. It was released on Hellcat Records on February 21, 2006.

== Track listing ==
1. "86 the Mayo" (Ruggiero) – 4:23
2. "Peculiar" (Ruggiero) – 4:08
3. "Propaganda" (Ruggiero/Babajian/Geard) – 4:31
4. "Crazy" (Ruggiero/The Slackers) – 3:31
5. "Set the Girl Free" (Ruggiero) – 2:38
6. "In Walked Capo" (Pine) – 3:21
7. "I'd Rather Die Happy" (Ruggiero) – 2:59
8. "What Went Wrong" (Pine) – 3:55
9. "Keep It Simple" (Hillyard/Ruggiero) – 3:05
10. "International War Criminal" (Ruggiero) – 3:57
11. "Sauron" (Hillyard) – 3:46
12. "Rider" (Ruggiero) – 4:02
13. "I Shall Be Released" (B. Dylan) – 4:20

== Personnel ==
=== The Slackers' players ===
- Ara Babajian – drums
- Marcus Geard – bass, stick guitar, backing vocals
- Dave Hillyard – saxophone
- Jay Nugent – guitar
- Glen Pine – trombone, vocals
- Vic Ruggiero – organ, piano, guitar, vocals, etc.

=== Additional players ===
- Marc Lyn – backing vocals on 3, 5, 6, 12, 13
- Alex Desert – backing vocals on 1, 5
- Larry McDonald – percussion on 12, 13
- Sidney Mills – organ on 13
- T.J. Scanlon – guitar on 3, 10, 12, 13
- Susan Walls – trumpet on 2, 8
