= Vic Ruggiero =

Victor "Vic" Ruggiero
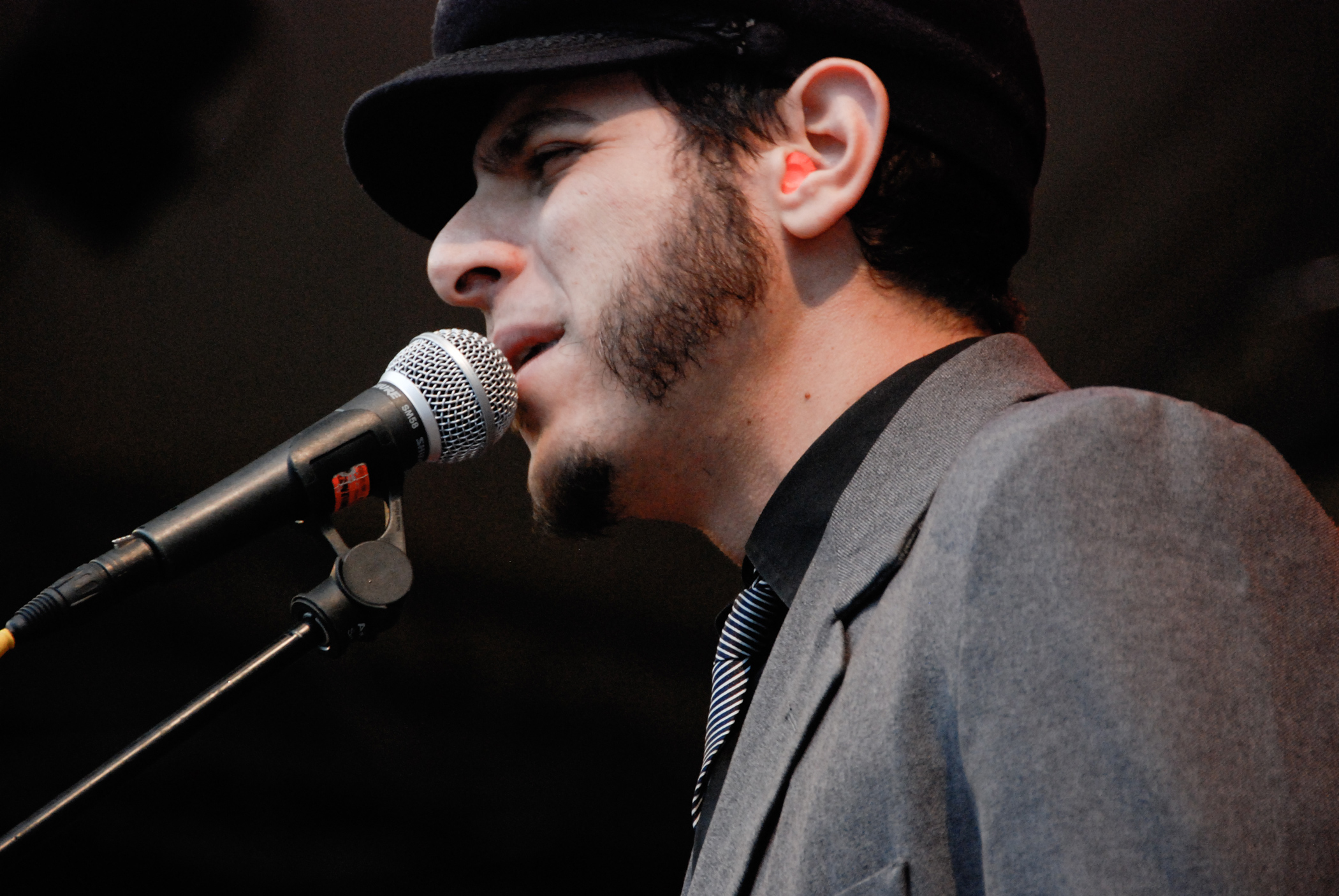

Background information
- Also known as: Rugaroo; Big Rick; Bad Vic; Lord Sluggo
- Born: Victor Ruggiero
- Origin: Bronx, New York City
- Genres: Reggae; Ska; Rocksteady; Blues; Punk
- Occupations: Musician; Songwriter; Producer
- Years active: 1993–present
- Labels: Hellcat Records; Do Tell Records; Stubborn Records; Moon Ska Records; Special Potatoe Records; Thought•Squad; Unison Music Group
- Website: vicruggiero.com

Victor "Vic" Ruggiero, (also known as Rugaroo, Bad Vic or Lord Sluggo) is a musician, songwriter and producer from New York City who has played in reggae, blues, ska and rocksteady bands since the early 1990s, including The Slackers, Stubborn All-Stars, SKAndalous All Stars, Crazy Baldhead and The Silencers (not to be confused with the Scottish rock band The Silencers). He has also performed with punk rock band Rancid, both live and in the studio. He has released four solo acoustic albums and continues to tour and record worldwide. Ruggiero is known primarily as a singer and organist, although he also plays piano, bass, banjo, cigar box guitar, guitar, harmonica and percussion.

Ruggiero is known for his deep distinct Bronx accent. His lyrics usually follow several themes, including the apocalypse, dark humor, political distrust, paranoia, murder, irony, romance and loneliness. His songs have ranged from narrative ballads to whimsical tunes inspired by Beat Generation poets, authors and songwriters, including Jack Kerouac, Allen Ginsberg and John Lennon.

== Biography ==
Ruggiero started playing piano by ear as a fifth grader and sang with the Metropolitan Opera at age 12. While attending Ardsley High School in 1986, he played in a hardcore group Sic & Mad fronted by his friend Happy, which is how he met Marcus Geard and Ara Babajian who would later become the bass and drummer behind the Slackers. Sic & Mad played a unique cocktail of art-punk, avant-garde, New York hardcore, hip-hop, reggae, psychedelia and ska music.

Starting in 1992, The Slackers started as a trio (Vic, Luis, Marcus) and extension of Sic & Mad. Early incarnations of the group were sometimes billed as The Redlights. Later, TJ joined the group on second guitar, Marq on vocals and after 2 years, Dave and Jeremy joined as the first official horn section on tenor sax and trumpet, respectively. Glen joined on trombone/vocals in October 1997 and Ara became the band's drummer in 2001.

Vic soon became the focal point of The Slackers, also making appearances with the Stubborn All-Stars, Rancid and a host of other groups. In the late 1990s, he began making his own records and released some of these under his own label, Special Potato Records. Ruggiero has recorded several solo albums on which he plays guitar, harmonica, percussion and sings: To Live in Shame/Understanding New Jersey, Alive at the Ladybug House, Hamburguru (2007), Something In My Blind Spot (2008), On the Rag Time (2009), Songs for Clandestine Lovers (2009). Collaborations with Zoot 16GB (Meatball and Sushi Party, 2009), Kepi Ghoulie (The New Dark Ages, 2009) and wrote songs for the book/CD production, Do Not Feed The Cats in Iraq (2010) with Phil Nerges.

He has worked as the producer behind a number of releases using Special Potato Records as the distribution outlet for many of these early works. Ruggiero's production style has a distinctively raw sound quality to it: by not erasing sounds that would traditionally be unwanted in a recording, such as doors closing or musicians cuing each other, his productions capture a live-band atmosphere more closely. Ruggiero has also been responsible for the production of releases from European ska artists, including Mr T Bone and The Moon Invaders and has performed with Shane and the Ashes, The Phenomenauts and The Forthrites.

=== Special Potato ===
Special Potato Records began in New York during the early 1990s. The label (sometimes spelled "special Potatoe") began as the primary outlet for self-released albums and those featuring members or alumni of The Slackers. After the initial release of a Nods record, followed by a solo record, over time, Special Potato became the calling card for distribution of Ruggiero's early works and continues to release albums.

Ruggiero has written, recorded and produced dozens of rocksteady, ska and reggae albums. His solo albums in particular are reportedly influenced by early rock n roll, doo-wop, blues and punk rock.

== The Slackers ==
Ruggiero is best known as the front man of the Third Wave Ska and Ska band The Slackers (1992–present). Early incarnations of the band were billed under The Nods, The Redlights and Sic & Mad. Smashing stereotypes of "Ska" as happy, uptempo, and shallow music, New York City's ska revolutionaries, the Slackers, play with an aggressive edge.

In 1996, The New York Times declared the Slackers to be part of "the sound of New York". Alternative Nation stated that their music is "protest music made for dim, sweaty basements, The Slackers would sound at home supporting Rancid as well as some grizzled New Orleans electric blues trio." The LA Weekly wrote about, "their unfettered energy, unerring skankability, and playful anger."

The band is known for releases featuring reggae legends like The Congos, Glen Adams of the Upsetters, Cornell Campbell and Doreen Schaeffer. In addition to these collaborative works, over the years, they have also released a dub record, collaboration with DJ Boss Harmony (who arranged and refiltered tracks), compilation of forgotten tracks, alternate versions, and remakes from the band's recording vaults. The band has also put out 3 live albums; Live at Ernestos (2000), Upsetting Ernestos (2005), Slack in Japan (2005). Since their start in 1992, the band has released two DVDs; The Slackers: A Documentary (2007) and Live at the Flamingo Cantina (2009).

== Solo albums ==
Ruggiero has released several acoustic solo albums in the U.S., including Understanding New Jersey & Living in Sin, Alive at the Ladybug House, On the Rag Time, Something in My Blindspot and THIS Two songs on the latter ("Lonely Nites" and "Innocent Girl") were re-recorded in July 2007 for the album Something in My Blindspot. This album was recorded in Berlin and released on February 15, 2008, by German label 'Moanin'. The track "Animales" also appears on the album, Alive at the Ladybug House.

In "Something in My Blindspot", Ruggiero sings and plays guitar, bass, organ, piano and banjo. Lisa Müller from the German ska/swing band Black Cat Zoot sings on four songs. The album also features a brass band, Fanfara Kalashnikov. Drums are played by Andrei Kluge from the ska band Rolando Random & The Young Soul Rebels.

Hamburguru is a solo album that has only been released in Japan by the Ska in the World label. Some songs on the album have been previously released on the demo entitled Top Secret Bounty and Clues. On Hamburguru, he plays in his typical fashion as a "one man band" on vocals, guitar, harmonica, kick drum and hi-hat.

THIS (album) is a Hi-Fidelity recording of fan-favorites, released on the Unison Music label. (UM59) Recorded and Produced by Bruce Witkin and Ryan Dorn at the Unison Music studio in Los Angeles. Vic performs the keyboards, guitars, mandolin, accordion, and harmonica. Bass performed by Bruce Witkin and Drums performed by Rob Klonel. Acoustic guitar on "Oklahoma" by Mitch Goodman.

Ruggiero maintains a solo touring schedule, he collaborated with The Forthrights and The Ashes as well as acoustic musicians and singers, including Chris Murray, Kepi Ghoulie, Lisa Müller and Maddie Ruthless on live and studio recordings. Ruggiero's music is primarily distributed by Asian Man Records, Hellcat Records, Ska in the World, Moanin' Music and Whatevski and he continues to tour and release new material.

Ruggiero is best known for his working-class roots, political radicalism, fiery personality and unique style of ska, punk rock, blues and rock music. He has played in bands like The Nods, SKAndalous All-Stars, Stubborn All-Stars, The Silencers, Da Whole Thing, David Hillyard and the Rocksteady 7, Crazy Baldhead Sound System, Victor Rice Octet, Sic & Mad, Tremoflex9000 and more. His guest appearances include famous artists like Rancid, The Transplants or Roger Miret and the Disasters. He has been seen playing many different kinds of organs, such as Roland VK-7, Roland VK-8 and Roland VK-09, Korg CX-3, Hammond XB-1G, Hammond XK-2, Rheem Mark 7 as well as a Rhodes Piano.

== Discography ==
=== Solo albums ===
- Understanding New Jersey & Living in Sin – 2001 (Moanin' Music)
- This is Special Potatoe, Vol. 1 – 2002 (Damaged Goods)
- Alive at the Ladybug House – 2004 (Thought•Squad)
- Mean & Nasty / Yes It's True (7-inch Single) (2005) (Ska in the World)
- Top Secret Bountry and Clues – 2006 (Also known as "Blues and Clues" and "Bounty and Clues".)
- Hamburguru – 2007 (Ska in the World)
- Something in My Blindspot – 2008 (Moanin' Music)
- On The Ragtime (7-inch EP Version) (2009) – (Silver Sprocket / Thought•Squad)
- Meatball And Sushi Party (2009) (split EP with The Zoot16 G・B Version) (Ska in the World)
- On The Ragtime (LP Version) (2009) – (Silver Sprocket / Thought•Squad)
- Songs For Clandestine Lovers (2009) (Ska in the World)
- The New Dark Ages – 2009 (split EP with Kepi Ghoulie) (Asian Man Records)
- Don't Feed The Cats in Iraq (collaboration with Phil Nerges) (2010) (Asian Man Records)
- Vic & Friends, Volume 1 – 2010 (Whatevski Records digital release)
- Policeman (7-inch Single) (split EP with Maddie Ruthless/The Forthrights) (2011) (Asbestos Records/Underground Communique)
- This (2014) (Unison Music Group)
- Stuff in My Pockets (2022) (Ring Of Fire Records)

=== With The Slackers ===
- The Slackers — 1993
- Better Late Than Never — 1996
- Redlight — 1997
- The Question — 1998
- Before There Were Slackers There Were... (The Nods) – 1999
- Live at Ernesto's (Live) — 2000
- Wasted Days — 2001
- The Slackers and Friends — 2002
- Close My Eyes — 2003
- International War Criminal (EP) — 2004
- Upsettin' Ernesto's (Live) — 2004
- The Slackers/Pulley Split — 2004
- An Afternoon in Dub — 2005
- Slack in Japan (Live) — 2005
- Peculiar — 2006
- The Boss Harmony Sessions — 2007
- Self Medication — 2008
- Lost and Found — 2009
- The Great Rocksteady Swindle — 2010
- The Slackers — 2016
- Don't Let The Sunshine Fool Ya' — 2022

=== With Da Whole Thing ===
- Tooth – 1998
- At Version City – 1998

=== With Chris Murray and The Slackers ===
- Slackness – 2005

=== With the SKAndalous All-Stars ===
- Hit Me – 1997
- Punk Steady – 1998
- Age of Insects – 1999

=== With the Stubborn All-Stars ===
- Open Season – 1995
- Back With a New Batch – 1997
- Nex Music – 1999
- At Version City – 1999

=== With Tremoflex9000 ===
- Tremoflex9000 EP (Black Rhombus)
- America For Sale

=== With The Barstool Preachers ===
Vocals and Organ on Track 3 – Looking Lost – 2016

== Appears on ==
=== With Rancid ===
- Life Won't Wait – 1998

Writing credits for tracks 5, 8 and 18
Hammond B3 Organ on tracks 5, 8, 9, 11, 13, 18 and 21
Piano on tracks 5, 9, 12, 14, 18 and 21
Percussion on tracks 5 and 18
Guitar on track 12

- Indestructible – 2003

Keyboards

- Let the Dominoes Fall −2009

Keyboards

=== With The Transplants ===
- Transplants – 2002

Hammond B3 Organ on tracks 2, 6, and 7
Hammond B3 Organ/Piano on tracks 9, 10, and 12

- Haunted Cities – 2005

Wurlitzer, Farfisa on track 6

=== With Pink ===
- Try This – 2003

keyboards

=== With P.O. Box ===
- InBetweenTheLines – 2009

Keyboards and Additional Guitars on track 7:Skinocracy

=== With Maddie Ruthless ===
- Policeman – 2011

=== With Faintest Idea ===
- Increasing The Minimum Rage – 2016

Hammond B3 Organ on track 1: Circling The Drain
