= Give 'Em the Boot =

Compilation album series by Hellcat records

Give 'Em the Boot is a series of compilation albums released by Hellcat Records. The first release came out July 29, 1997, and there has been a new release every other year, except for the gap between the second and third releases, which had three years in between. It is similar to the Punk-O-Rama and Unsound series released by Hellcat's parent label, Epitaph Records.

The series is released to promote bands on Hellcat Records. Because of this, the price of the compilations are cheaper than other regular releases, to encourage fans to buy it and hear bands that they may or may not have heard of before.

The title of the series comes from a lyric in the song "Roots Radicals" which appears on the album ...And Out Come the Wolves by Rancid. The head of Hellcat Records is Tim Armstrong, who is lead singer and guitarist for Rancid.

In 2005, a DVD was released under the Give 'Em the Boot name. It featured live performances by many Hellcat artists, including multiple appearances by Rancid.

== Give 'Em The Boot ==
Give 'Em the Boot

Compilation album by Various Artists
- Released: July 29, 1997
- Genre: Punk rock/Ska
- Length: 61:17
- Label: Hellcat Records
- Producer: Various

Give 'Em the Boot chronology
Give 'Em the Boot (1997)	Give 'Em the Boot II (1999)

Professional ratings
Review scores
Source	Rating
Allmusic	3/5 stars

Give 'Em the Boot is the first compilation album in the Give 'Em the Boot series.

This, as all other albums, is the only entry not to include the boot design of all of the other covers, but a night city design instead.

=== Track listing ===
1. "The Brothels" – Rancid – 2:57
2. "Watch This" – The Slackers – 3:57
3. "Can't Wait" – Hepcat – 3:19
4. "New Breed" – The Pietasters – 2:41
5. "Spirit of the Streets" – The Business – 1:57
6. "Los Hombres No Lloran" – Voodoo Glow Skulls – 2:50
7. "Barroom Heroes (original version)" – Dropkick Murphys – 3:11
8. "Does He Love You" – Skinnerbox – 2:52
9. "17 @ 17" – The Upbeat – 3:03
10. "Open Season" – Stubborn All-Stars – 3:55
11. "Beautiful Girl" – The Gadjits – 2:52
12. "Roots Radicals" (Rancid cover, sang in Spanish) – Union 13 – 2:38
13. "Jaks" – U.S. Bombs – 2:46
14. "Fifteenth and T" – Swingin' Utters – 2:12
15. "Latin Goes Ska" – Skatalites – 6:14
16. "Policeman" – The Silencers – 3:31
17. "Heart Like a Lion" – Pressure Point – 2:14
18. "Infested" – Choking Victim – 2:45
19. "No Time" – F-Minus – 0:41
20. "Playtime" – Dave Hillyard and the Rocksteady Seven – 4:42

== Give 'Em The Boot II ==
Give 'Em the Boot II

Compilation album by various artists
- Released: October 19, 1999
- Genre: Punk rock/Ska
- Length: 63:13
- Label: Hellcat Records
- Producer: Various

Give 'Em the Boot chronology
Give 'Em the Boot (1997)	Give 'Em the Boot II (1999)	Give 'Em the Boot III (2002)

Professional ratings
Review scores
Source	Rating
AllMusic	4.5/5 stars

Give 'Em the Boot II is the second compilation album in the Give 'Em the Boot series.

This was the first entry to feature the standard boot design for the cover. Every album since, as of 2007, has used the same design with a different background color.

=== Track listing ===
1. "Intro" – 0:08
2. "The Gang's All Here" – Dropkick Murphys – 2:07
3. "Riding the Region" – Hepcat – 2:47
4. "If the Kids Are United" – Rancid – 2:41
5. "Nocturnal" – Tiger Army – 2:02
6. "Can't Stand It" – The Pietasters – 3:57
7. "Tell Me What You're Feeling" – Nocturnal – 2:54
8. "Goin' Out" – U.S. Bombs – 2:54
9. "Bad Gadjit" – The Gadjits – 3:36
10. "L.A. Girl" – The Distillers – 2:51
11. "X-Ray Style" – Joe Strummer and the Mescaleros – 4:30
12. "Misty Days" – Buju Banton w/ Rancid – 2:53
13. "The Fool" – Dave Hillyard and the Rocksteady Seven – 3:04
14. "Bruk Out" – Buccaneer w/ Rancid – 3:45
15. "Have the Time" – The Slackers – 3:05
16. "Crack Rock Steady" – Choking Victim – 3:03
17. "Forget Yourself" – F-Minus – 1:47
18. "Crack City Rockers" – Leftöver Crack – 2:33
19. "Fools Gold" – Mouthwash – 3:20
20. "Rent for Sale" – INDK – 1:51
21. "Flight of the Phoenicians" – Vanity Five – 3:37
22. "Life Won't Wait" – Rancid – 3:48

== Give 'Em The Boot III ==
Give 'Em the Boot III

Compilation album by various artists
- Released: February 12, 2002
- Genre: Punk rock/Ska
- Label: Hellcat Records
- Producer: Various

Give 'Em the Boot chronology
Give 'Em the Boot II (1999)	Give 'Em the Boot III (2002)	Give 'Em the Boot IV (2004)

Professional ratings
Review scores
Source	Rating
Allmusic	3/5 stars

Give 'Em the Boot III is the third compilation album in the Give 'Em the Boot series, released in 2002 (see 2002 in music).

=== Track listing ===
No.	Title	Artist	Length
1.	"Sick of It All"	The Distillers
2.	"The Legend of Finn MacCumhail"	Dropkick Murphys
3.	"Die Alone"	U.S. Bombs
4.	"Golden Gate Fields"	Rancid
5.	"Skunx"	Lars Frederiksen and the Bastards
6.	"Suburban Blight"	F-Minus
7.	"Liberty"	Agnostic Front
8.	"The Poisoning"	The Nerve Agents
9.	"Amera Nightmare"	Duane Peters and the Hunns
10.	"Give 'Em the Boot"	Roger Miret and the Disasters
11.	"Atheist Anthem"	Leftöver Crack
12.	"Who Killed the Cheerleader"	Nekromantix
13.	"Power of Moonlite"	Tiger Army
14.	"Vampire Girl"	Devil's Brigade
15.	"Information Error"	The Slackers
16.	"Global A Go-Go"	Joe Strummer and the Mescaleros
17.	"Precipice"	King Django
18.	"Nothing Good to Eat"	The Pietasters
19.	"We Evolve"	Mouthwash
20.	"One Stones Throw (From a Riot)"	The Gadjits
21.	"Beautiful"	Hepcat

Also contains 2 bonus videos in .mpg format:

Title	Artist
"Cupid's Victim"	Tiger Army
"Spicy McHaggis Jig"	Dropkick Murphys

== Give 'Em The Boot IV ==
Give 'Em the Boot IV

Compilation album by various artists
- Released: November 9, 2004
- Genre: Punk rock/Ska
- Label: Hellcat Records
- Producer: Various

Give 'Em the Boot chronology
Give 'Em the Boot III (2002)	Give 'Em the Boot IV (2004)	Give 'Em the Boot V (2006)

Professional ratings
Review scores
Source	Rating
Allmusic	4.5/5 stars
PopMatters	5/10 stars

Give 'Em the Boot IV is the fourth compilation album in the Give 'Em the Boot series, released in 2004 (see 2004 in music). The album is best known to feature the first recorded version of "I'm Shipping Up to Boston" by the Dropkick Murphys. The song would be re-recorded for The Warrior's Code, featured on the soundtrack for The Departed and would eventually become the band's biggest selling single breaking them through to a wider audience.

=== Track listing ===
1. "Killing Zone" – Rancid
2. "Dirty Reggae" – The Aggrolites
3. "Atomic" – Tiger Army
4. "Propaganda" – The Slackers
5. "Kiss Kiss Kill Kill" – Roger Miret and the Disasters
6. "Lost Paradise" – U.S. Roughnecks
7. "Caught in Between" – F-Minus
8. "Marshall Law" – Die Hunns
9. "I'm Shipping Up to Boston" – Dropkick Murphys
10. "1%" – Lars Frederiksen & The Bastards
11. "That's What I Know" – Brain Failure
12. "Let There Be Peace" – Chris Murray
13. "Dead Bodies" – Nekromantix
14. "Romper Stomper" – Transplants
15. "Junco Partner (live)" – Joe Strummer & The Mescaleros
16. "No Rest for the Weekend" – Orange
17. "Dia de los Muertos" – Rezurex
18. "Waste of Time" – The Unseen
19. "Break Me" – Ducky Boys
20. "Where They Wander" – HorrorPops
21. "S.C. Drunx" – South Central Riot Squad
22. "Trauma" – Mercy Killers
23. "Skinwalkers" – 12 Step Rebels
24. "Wasted Life" – The Escaped
25. "Rise Up" – Pressure Point
26. "Room to Breathe" – Westbound Train

== Give 'Em The Boot V ==
Give 'Em the Boot V

Compilation album by various artists
- Released: May 23, 2006
- Genre: Punk rock/ska
- Label: Hellcat
- Producer: Various

Give 'Em the Boot chronology
Give 'Em the Boot IV (2004)	Give 'Em the Boot V (2006)	Give 'Em the Boot VI (2007)

Professional ratings
Review scores
Source	Rating
AllMusic	4/5 stars

Give 'Em the Boot V is the fifth compilation album in the Give 'Em the Boot series, released in 2006.

=== Track listing ===
1. "Tattoo" – Rancid
2. "The Warriors Code" – Dropkick Murphys
3. "Cold Concrete" – Time Again
4. "Swift Silent Deadly" – Tiger Army
5. "Act the Part"* – The Unseen
6. "Crazy" – The Slackers
7. "The Sinner"* – Left Alone
8. "Funky Fire" – The Aggrolites
9. "Crawl Straight Home" – HorrorPops
10. "Another Generation"* – Roger Miret and the Disasters
11. "Widow Maker"* – The Heart Attacks
12. "Pamint De Mort" – Mercy Killers
13. "I'm No Different"* – Westbound Train
14. "The Kids Aren't Quiet on Sharmon Palms" – Lars Frederiksen and the Bastards
15. "I'm a Cunt"* – Orange
16. "Driller Killer" – Nekromantix
17. "Victim of Hate"* – Static Thought
18. "Day and Night"* – Los Difuntos

According to the back of the album, the asterisk stands for tracks that were unreleased.

== Give 'Em The Boot VI ==
Give 'Em the Boot VI

Compilation album by various artists
- Released: October 30, 2006
- Genre: Punk rock/ska
- Label: Hellcat
- Producer: Various

Give 'Em the Boot chronology
Give 'Em the Boot V (2006)	Give 'Em the Boot VI (2006)	Give 'Em the Boot VII (2007)

Give 'Em the Boot VI is the sixth compilation album in the Give 'Em the Boot series, released in 2007.

=== Track listing ===
1. Rancid– Endrina
2. HorrorPops– Freaks In Uniforms
3. The Aggrolites– Reggae Hit L.A.
4. Static Thought– Corruption
5. Time Again– Soon It Will Be
6. The Unseen– Talking Bombs
7. Westbound Train– Please Forgive Me
8. The Slackers– Rider
9. The Heart Attacks– You Oughtta Know By Now
10. Operation Ivy – Here We Go Again
11. Orange (14) – Get The Fuck Out Of My Way
12. Los Difuntos – Born, Raised, Passed Away
13. Tim Armstrong – Inner City Violence
14. Societys Parasites – Who's On Your Side
15. Nekromantix – Voodoo Shop Hop
16. City To City – Left Alone
17. Dropkick Murphys – Citizen C.I.A
18. Tiger Army – Afterworld

== Give 'Em The Boot VII ==
Give 'Em the Boot VII

Compilation album by various artists
- Released: 2009
- Genre: Punk rock/ska
- Label: Hellcat
- Producer: Various

Give 'Em the Boot chronology
Give 'Em the Boot VI (2007)	Give 'Em the Boot VII (2009)

Give 'Em The Boot VII is the seventh release by Hellcat Records in the Give 'Em The Boot series.

=== Track listing ===
1. Rancid– East Bay Night
2. The Aggrolites– Runnin' Strong
3. Westbound Train– Check Your Time
4. Left Alone– Sad Story
5. Orange (14)– Standing Still
6. Danny Diablo– Don't You Want Me
7. Civet– Pay Up
