= SKAndalous All-Stars =

American ska band

- Origin: United States
- Genres: Ska; reggae
- Years active: 1990s
- Members: Ara Babajian; Nathan Breedlove; Brendog; Doug Dubrosky; Dan Dulin; Joe Ferry; Marcus Geard; Corey Glover; Chris "Skunk" Hanson; Donna Lupie; Victor Rice; Greg Robinson; Vic Ruggiero; Britt Savage; T. J. Scanlon; The Tiny Tim Irregulars

The SKAndalous All-Stars is an American ska band, composed of members of The Slackers, The Skatalites, Mephiskapheles, the Stubborn All-Stars, Agent 99, Ruder Than You, Sic & Mad, the Excalibur, Cocktaillica, the Hurtin' Buckaroos, Living Colour, Perfect Thyroid, the Cycle Sluts from Hell, and The Klezmatics, and is led by Slackers frontman Vic Ruggiero. Considered one of the first ska supergroups, the Skandalous All-Stars built their reputation on ska- and reggae-stylized versions of popular rock and pop tunes. Their first two albums – Hit Me, released in 1997, and Punk Steady, released the following year – included dance-inspiring interpretations of songs by the Sex Pistols, The Clash, Blondie, Patti Smith, the Ramones, Kiss, Nirvana, Radiohead, Stevie Wonder, and White Zombie. With their third album, The Age of Insects, released in 1999, the group began focusing on the original songs of keyboardist and vocalist Ruggiero.

== Members ==
- Donna Lupie, Chris "Skunk" Hanson, Britt Savage, Joe Ferry, Corey Glover – vocals
- Nathan Breedlove, Dan Dulin – trumpet
- Greg Robinson – trombone
- Doug Dubrosky – saxophone, vocals, percussion
- Brendog – lead guitar
- T. J. Scanlon – guitar
- Victor Rice – bass
- Marcus Geard – bass, vocals, percussion
- Ara Babajian – drums
- Vic Ruggiero – vocals, piano, keyboards, percussion, guitar, stick bass
- The Tiny Tim Irregulars – backing vocals

== Discography ==
- Hit Me (Shanachie, 1997)
- Punk Steady (Shanachie, 1998)
- Age of Insects (Shanachie, 1999)
