= 1989 (disambiguation) =

1989 was a common year starting on Sunday in the Gregorian calendar.

1989 may also refer to:

== Albums ==
- 1989 (album), a 2014 album by Taylor Swift
  - 1989 (Taylor's Version), a re-recording of the album, 2023
  - 1989 (Ryan Adams album), a 2015 cover album
- 1989, a 1989 album reissued in 2009 by After Crying
- 1989, a 2009 album by Jacopo Sarno
- 1989, a 2014 album by the Virginia Sil'hooettes
- 1989, a 2017 album by Rune Reilly Kölsch
- 1989: The Best of Power of Dreams, a 2010 album by Power of Dreams

== Songs ==
- "1989", a song by Clem Snide from the album Your Favorite Music, 1999
- "1989", a song by Less Than Jake from the album Borders & Boundaries, 2000
- "1989", a song by Titiyo from the album Come Along, 2001
- "1989", a song by Mindless Self Indulgence from the album You'll Rebel to Anything, 2005
- "1989", a song by Portugal. The Man from the album Censored Colors, 2008
- "1989", a song by Civet from the album Hell Hath No Fury, 2008
- "1989", a song by the Rakes from the album Klang, 2009
- "1989", a song by Devlin from the album Bud, Sweat and Beers, 2010
- "1989", a song by Chris August from the album The Upside of Down, 2012
- "1989", a 1978 song by Spizzenergi
- "1989", a 2003 song by the Spits
- "1989", a 2010 song by Power of Dreams

== See also ==
- 1998 (disambiguation)
