= Alive at the Ladybug House =

Live album by Vic Ruggiero
- Released: 2004
- Venue: The Ladybug House
- Genre: Folk
- Label: Thought•Squad
- Producer: Mitch Goodman

Professional ratings
Review scores
Source	Rating
Allmusic	4/5 stars

Alive at the Ladybug House is the second solo, acoustic album from The Slackers' keyboardist/lead singer, Vic Ruggiero. It was released in 2004. Recorded live at The Ladybug House in Pasadena, CA USA

== Track listing ==
1. "Mean + Nasty" (2:45)
2. "Vic's Lament" (2:36)
3. "'Til the Early Morning" (4:12)
4. "International War Criminal" (2:58)
5. "American Psychopath" (2:53)
6. "20 Flight Rock" (2:45)
7. "Parking Lot" (3:06)
8. "Yes It's True" (4:00)
9. "Animales" (5:44)
10. "86 The Mayo" (3:06)
