= Eric Singer (artist) =

American artist

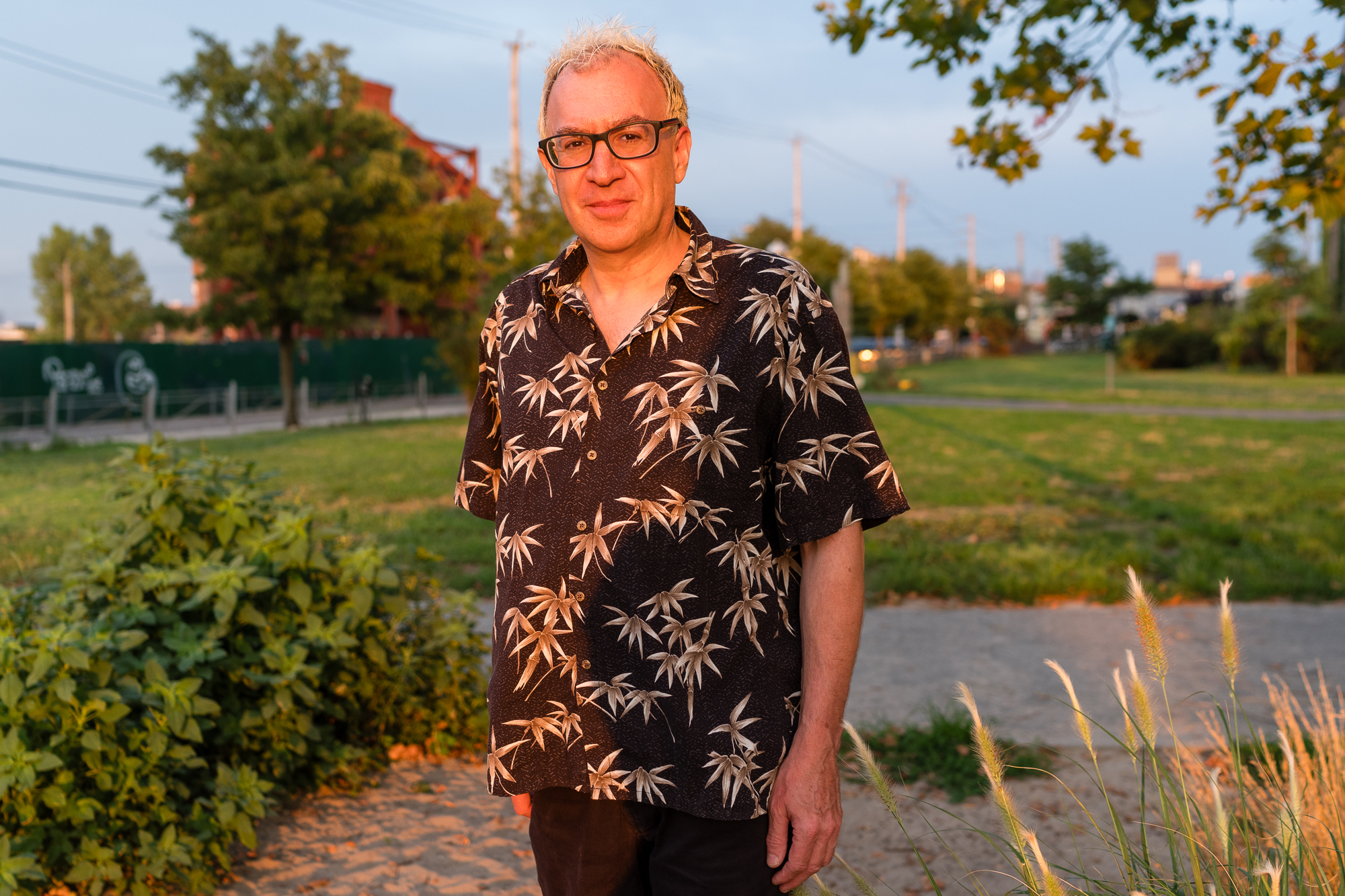
- Singer in 2024
- Website: ericsinger.com

Eric Singer is a multi-disciplinary artist, musician and software, electrical, computer, robotics, and medical device engineer. He is known for his interactive art and technology works, robotic and electronic musical instruments, fire art, and guerilla art.

== Education ==
Singer holds a B.S. in electrical and computer engineering from Carnegie Mellon University, a diploma in music synthesis from Berklee College of Music and an M.S. in computer science from New York University.

Singer has been an adjunct professor at both NYU and CMU, designing and teaching graduate courses in electronic art and music, interactive performance and controller design.

== Electronic, computer and robotic music ==
Singer is known internationally as a creator of alternative MIDI controllers and musical instruments, interactive and algorithmic music software and robotic musical instruments.

Singer began creating interactive performance software in 1990 as an assistant to Dr. Richard Boulanger. Written primarily in the Max multimedia programming environment, this included software for MIDI controllers such as the Radio Baton and Power Glove. He quickly became known as a Max expert, releasing a series of popular Max plug-ins for video tracking, electronic conducting and artificial life bird-flocking simulation.

In the mid-90s, Singer began creating his own novel electronic instruments. One early instrument of note was the Sonic Banana, a rubber tube with bend sensors to control arpeggiators and other generative music. Later instruments included the GuiroTron, ChimeOTron, SlinkOTron, SlimeOTron, CycloTron and MIDI Steering Wheel (for Joshua Fried). Many of these instruments were featured in his 2011 solo retrospective "Living in the Future." Singer also designed and marketed a sensor and robotic interface board, MidiTron, to aid other artists in creating their own MIDI instruments.

In Brooklyn, NY in 2000, Singer founded the pioneering musical robotics group LEMUR: League of Electronic Musical Urban Robots. Over the next decade, Singer led the group to create a large body of robotic musical instruments; produce performances with renowned musicians; present installations at well-known museums and galleries; and open LEMURplex, an early makerspace for performance, gallery shows, artist residencies, teaching and fabrication.

LEMUR presented installations and performances throughout the world, at venues including Lincoln Center, the Whitney Museum, the National Gallery of Art and the Virgin Festival. LEMUR also collaborated with musicians and composers on live human/robot performances as well as solo works for LEMUR's instruments. Notable musicians and groups included pop artists They Might Be Giants, Lee Ranaldo of Sonic Youth, JG Thirlwell, Morton Subotnick, Ikue Mori and George Lewis.

In 2009, Grammy-winning guitarist Pat Metheny commissioned LEMUR to build a large robotic orchestra, or orchestrion. This resulted in Metheny's 2010 Orchestrion album and world tour, with LEMUR instruments as his backing band.

After to moving to Pittsburgh in 2009, Singer established as a solo artist under the name SingerBots and continues to do performances and large commissioned installations. In 2014, he was commissioned to create a robotic orchestra for the Lido Cabaret in Paris. The resulting 40+ piece orchestrion is featured nightly as the club's dinner band. In 2018, Singer built the SpiroPhone, a spiraling robotic xylophone sculpture that lives as a permanent installation in RoboWorld at the Carnegie Science Center.

From 2012 to 2014, Singer consulted for Disney Imagineering on the Touche project to enable plants to play music in response to touch.

Singer has also created software for generative music and algorithmic improvisation, including an animated improvising saxophone player at the NYU Media Research Lab in 1996 and a generative drum and percussion program for an installation at the Beall Center in 2005. In 2018, he appeared on WNYC's Science Friday to discuss the topic of computer improvisation in music.

== Fire and guerilla arts ==
In 1997, Singer founded the New York City Burning Man Regional Association and served as the NYC regional contact for two years, organizing events and popularizing the festival in the New York area.

Around the same time, Singer co-founded the influential Brooklyn arts combine The Madagascar Institute, with Chris Hackett and Ryan O'Connor

Over the next decade, The Madagascar Institute would become known as a leading underground arts group with over 100 members, producing machine and fire art, expansive themed warehouse parties, guerilla street spectacles and theatrical events in abandoned urban buildings. In 2002, Singer led a Madagascar Institute team to victory on The Learning Channel reality TV show Junkyard Wars.

Singer has been involved in fire arts since the inception of the Madagascar Institute, creating pyrotechnic spectacles for many events and collaborating on a Pyrophone (MIDI-controlled flamethrower instrument). In 2000, he created Flaming Simon, a life-size fire-based version of the Simon electronic game. In 2008, he premiered PyroStomp, a walk-on step sequencer which controlled an eight cannon pyrophone. For the 2017 Roboexotica festival, he built a robot to create flaming cocktails.

In Pittsburgh, Singer created and produced the Pyrotopia Festival of Fire Arts, first in 2012 and again in 2014. These large-scale outdoor events featured fire performers, art, games, installations, glass-blowing, forging and fire science demonstrations.

== Performer ==
Singer has been a saxophonist since an early age. Throughout the 90s, he co-founded, performed in and recorded with a number of popular ska bands in Boston and New York, including Agent 13, Metro Stylee, The Allstonians, The Slackers, Stubborn All-Stars and Skinnerbox. He can be heard on commercially released recordings by these and other bands.

Singer studied improv comedy in New York City at the Upright Citizens Brigade Theater and has studied and performed in Pittsburgh at the Arcade Comedy Theater, Unplanned Comedy and Steel City Improv Theater. He has formed and performed with a number of Pittsburgh long-form improv groups and duos. He has written sketch comedy and performed in the Pittsburgh comedy duo The Problem with comedian Ian Insect. He currently performs in Philadelphia.

== Medical device engineering ==
Since 2014, Singer has worked in the field of medical device engineering. From 2016 to 2018, Singer was part of Cerebroscope, a medical startup creating an experimental EEG device for monitoring cortical spreading depolarizations (CSDs) in stroke and TBI patients. Singer designed and fabricated the device, called CerebroPatch, which began clinical trials in 2018 at the University of New Mexico Hospital.

Following this, he has worked as a software engineer for various medical device companies including Philips Respironics, Moberg Research and Molecular Devices.

== Publications ==
- Singer, Eric; Goldberg, Athomas; Perlin, Ken; Castiglia, Clilly; Liao, Sabrina (1996). Improv: Interactive Improvisational Animation and Music. Seventh International Symposium on Electronic Art (ISEA'96). ISEA'96 Proceedings. Rotterdam, Netherlands: Inter-Society for the Electronic Arts (ISEA).
- Singer, Eric; Castiglia, Clilly; Liao, Sabrina; Perlin, Ken (1996). Real-time Responsive Synthetic Dancers and Musicians. SIGGRAPH 96. ACM SIGGRAPH 96 Visual Proceedings: The Art and Interdisciplinary Programs of SIGGRAPH '96. New Orleans, LA: Association for Computing Machinery.
- Rowe, Robert; Vila, Doris; Singer, Eric (1996). A Flock of Words: Real Time Animation and Video Controlled by Algorithmic Music Analysis. SIGGRAPH 96. ACM SIGGRAPH 96 Visual Proceedings: The Art and Interdisciplinary Programs of SIGGRAPH '96. New Orleans, LA: Association for Computing Machinery.
- Rowe, Robert; Singer, Eric (1997). Two Highly Integrated Real-Time Music and Graphics Performance Systems. International Computer Music Conference, ICMC '97. Thessaloniki, Greece: International Computer Music Association.
- Singer, Eric; Feddersen, Jeff; Bowen, Bil (2005). A Large-Scale Networked Robotic Musical Instrument Installation. International Conference on New Interfaces for Musical Expression (NIME-05). Proceedings of the 2005 International Conference on New Interfaces for Musical Expression. Vancouver, CA. S2CID 8101082.
- Singer, Eric; Larke, Kevin; Bianciardi, David (2003). LEMUR GuitarBot: MIDI Robotic String Instrument. International Conference on New Interfaces for Musical Expression (NIME-03). Proceedings of the 2003 Conference on New Interfaces for Musical Expression. Montreal, CA: New Interfaces for Musical Expression. S2CID 6050028.
- Singer, Eric (2003). Sonic Banana: A Novel Bend-Sensor-Based MIDI Controller. International Conference on New Interfaces for Musical Expression (NIME-03). Proceedings of the 2003 Conference on New Interfaces for Musical Expression. Montreal, CA: New Interfaces for Musical Expression. S2CID 11693736.
- Boulanger, Richard, ed. (2000). The Csound Book: Perspectives in Software Synthesis, Sound Design, Signal Processing, and Programming (CD-ROM). Cambridge, MA: MIT Press.
- Zorn, John, ed. (2008). Arcana III: Musicians on Music. New York, NY: Hips Road/Tzadik.
- Bianciardi, David; Igoe, Tom; Singer, Eric (2005). EOS Pods: Wireless Devices for Interactive Musical Performance (PDF). ACM Fifth Annual Conference on Ubiquitous Computing (Ubicomp'05). ACM Fifth Annual Conference on Ubiquitous Computing Adjunct Proceedings. Tokyo, Japan: Association for Computing Machinery. pp. 13–15.
