= Living in Sin =

Living in sin may refer to:

== Culture ==
- Cohabitation, pejoratively; a romantic couple living together while remaining unmarried

== Music ==
- Living in Sin (EP), a 2020 EP by Hooligan Hefs
- "Living in Sin" (song), a 1989 song by Bon Jovi
- "Living in Sin", by Richard A. Whiting, 1931
- "Living in Sin", a song by Gene Simmons from the 1978 album Gene Simmons
- "Living in Sin", a song by Hawaii form the 1983 album One Nation Underground
- "Living in Sin", a song by Mammal from the 2000 album Vol 2: Systematic/Automatic
- "Living in Sin", a song by Virgin Steele from the 1982 album Virgin Steele

== See also ==
- Living in Skin, a 2000 studio album by Jason Harrod
- Understanding New Jersey & Living in Sin, a 2000 album by Vic Ruggiero
