= Peculiar =

Peculiar may refer to:

- Peculiar (album), an album by The Slackers
- Peculiar, a comic strip later published as a book, by cartoonist Richard Sala
- Royal peculiar, an ecclesiastical district, parish, chapel or church outside the jurisdiction of the bishop of the diocese in which it is situated
- Chemically peculiar star, a star that has a distinct pattern of chemicals.

== Places ==
- Peculiar, Missouri
- Peculiar Township, Cass County, Missouri

== See also ==
- Peculier (disambiguation)
- Peculiar galaxy
- Peculiar People
