= Hell Hath No Fury (Civet album) =

Studio album by Civet
- Released: September 9, 2008
- Recorded: 2008 at The Recording Company Studio; Henson Recording Studios, Hollywood, California.
- Genre: Punk rock
- Length: 34:57
- Label: Hellcat; 80501-2
- Producer: Julian Raymond, Howard Willing

Civet chronology
Massacre (2005)	Hell Hath No Fury (2008)	Love & War (2011)

Singles from Hell Hath No Fury
- 1. "Son of a Bitch" Released: 2008

Hell Hath No Fury is the fourth album by American punk rock band Civet. The album was released on September 9, 2008. It was their first release on independent label Hellcat Records. It is the first Civet album featuring Jacqui Valentine as the band's bassist and the only one featuring Danni Harrowyn.

== Track listing ==
All tracks are written by Liza Graves, Suzi Homewrecker, Jacqui Valentine, and Danni Harrowyn, except where noted.

No.	Title	Length
1.	"Alibis"	3:03
2.	"Son of a Bitch"	2:55
3.	"Pay Up"	4:02
4.	"All I Want" (Liza Graves, Tim Armstrong)	2:17
5.	"Bad Luck"	1:27
6.	"Brooklyn"	2:10
7.	"Take Me Away"	3:19
8.	"1989"	2:31
9.	"Gin and Tonic"	3:25
10.	"You Got It"	2:29
11.	"Sin City"	2:41
12.	"You Don't Know Me"	2:14
13.	"Hell Hath No Fury"	2:24
Total length:		34:57

== Personnel ==
Civet

- Liza Graves – Lead vocals, rhythm guitar
- Suzy Homewrecker – Lead guitar, backing vocals
- Jacqui Valentine – Bass guitar, backing vocals
- Danni Harrowyn – Drums, backing vocals

Additional musicians

- Tim Armstrong - Additional writing on "All I Want"

Artwork

- Matt Grayson – Album cover photography
- Bree Kristel Clarke – Poster photography
- Time Freeze Studios – Album Artwork

Production

- Julian Raymond – Producer,
- Howard Willing – Producer, mixing, engineer
- Kevin Mills - Assistant Engineer
- Robert Vosgien – Mastering

Management

- Laura Jean M. Hyde – Management
- Tom Hoppa – Booking Agent for The Kirby Organization
- Keith R. Walner – Legal
