= Crazy Baldhead =

Crazy Baldhead may refer to:

- "Crazy Baldhead", a song by Bob Marley released in 1976 on his studio album Rastaman Vibration
- Jay Nugent, also known as Crazy Baldhead, a guitarist and DJ from New York
