= Self-medication (disambiguation) =

Self-medication is a human behavior in which an individual uses unprescribed drugs to treat untreated and/or undiagnosed ailments.

Self-medication may also refer to:

- Self Medication (album), a 2008 album by the Slackers
- "Self-Medication" (The Venture Bros.), an episode of The Venture Bros
- Zoopharmacognosy, self-medication in animals

== See also ==
- Self Medicated, a 2005 film by Monty Lapica
