= Something in My Blindspot =

Studio album by Vic Ruggiero
- Released: February 15, 2008
- Label: moanin'

Vic Ruggiero chronology
Hamburguru (2007)	Something in My Blindspot (2008)	On The Ragtime (2009)

Something In My Blindspot is the fourth solo album by The Slackers' organist and lead singer, Vic Ruggiero. It was released on August 5, 2008 on the Berlin-based record label Moanin' Records.

The basic tracks for the album were recorded in Berlin in July 2007. Two songs ("Lonely Nights" and "Innocent Girl") had already been recorded for the album Hamburguru, and "Animals" was recorded on the album Alive at the Ladybug House.

The album features Ruggiero on vocals, guitar, bass, organ, piano, and banjo. Four of the album's tracks feature vocals from Lisa Müller of the German ska-swing band Black Cat Zoot. The album also features the brass band Fanfara Kalashnikov. Drums were played by Andrei Kluge from the ska band Rolando Random & The Young Soul Rebels.

== Track listing ==
1. "Taking Care Of Business"
2. "A Lovely Beginning" feat. Lisa Müller
3. "Innocent Girl"
4. "Always Something In My Blindspot"
5. "My Place" feat. Lisa Müller
6. "Hope I Never"
7. "Lonely Nights" feat. Lisa Müller
8. "Vacant Stare"
9. "If This Night"
10. "Is It You?" feat. Lisa Müller
11. "Lonely Nights Reprise" feat. Fanfare Kalashnikov
12. "A Love Of Confusion"
13. "Mad At Me" feat. Lisa Müller
14. "Animals" feat. Fanfare Kalashnikov
