= Jammyland =

New York City-based independent music retailer

Jammyland Records was an independent record store located in New York City. Founded by Ira Heaps in 1992, the store operated at 60 E 3rd Street in Manhattan. Jammyland specialized in Jamaican music, with a particular focus on reggae, ska, and rocksteady from the 1960s and 1970s. The store also reissued obscure reggae recordings.

In its early years, Jammyland featured a recording studio in the basement, which was used by artists such as Victor Rice, The Slackers and the Dynamos. The space was later occupied by Hospital Productions, a record label specializing in black metal and noise music.

Jammyland closed in 2008, though Heaps continued to sell records from his home.

== Jammyland All-Stars ==
Visiting Jamaican artists such as Glen Adams, B.B. Seaton, Glen Brown, Sammy Dread, Ranking Joe, Cornell Campbell, Milton Henry and Congo Ashanti Roy of The Congos are sometimes backed by a collective of musicians under the name Jammyland All-Stars. The band includes the store's owner, Ira Heaps, on bass guitar.

Other Musicians Include: Eddie Ocampo - Drums, Brett Tubin - Rhythm Guitar, Justin Rothberg - Lead Guitar, Benny Herson - Drums
