= Glen Pine =

- Genres: Reggae, Ska, Rocksteady, Psychedelic music
- Occupation(s): Musician, songwriter
- Instrument: Trombone

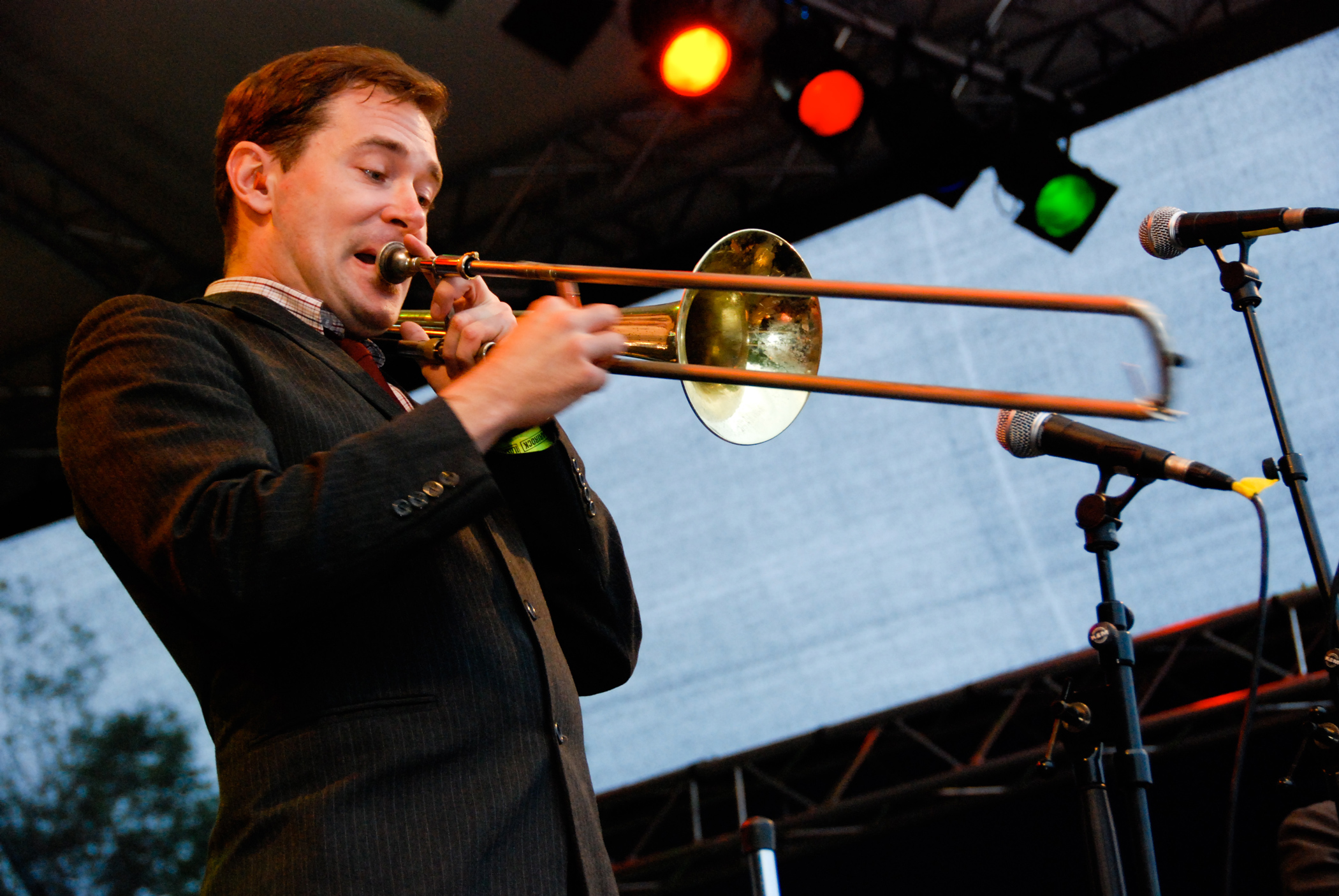

Glen William Pine is an American musician and songwriter from Boston, Massachusetts. He is most known for his role in The Slackers where he plays the trombone and sings. Pine joined the Slackers before the release of The Question on which he contributed with the song Mountainside. Glen was an original member of Boston-based reggae outfit The Pressure Cooker (). Along with Vic Ruggiero, he has performed under the name the Redlights.

Pine's lyrics usually touch upon lost love and other sad themes, although there are exceptions like the above-mentioned Mountainside. His songs often take the shape of ballads, but his range of styles also includes soul and ska. Pine has covered the Sam Cooke song Cupid on several occasions, including the album Upsettin' Ernesto's and live on a wedding gig in Colorado. He is also a well-known fan of Horace Andy, something that is apparent in the cover version of The Beatles' "We Can Work It Out", found on the Slackers' Lost and Found release.

In late-2011, Pine released two tracks on Pickle Don Records under the project name, The Hall Trees. The tracks were mixed by DJ 100dBs, and featured Dan Brenner (guitar and drums) and band-mate Marcus Geard (bass and guitar).

== Discography ==
With The Slackers

- The Question (1998)
- Live at Ernesto's
- Wasted Days (2001)
- Close My Eyes (2003)
- Upsettin' Ernesto's (2004)
- The Slackers/Pulley Split (2004)
- Slackness - Chris Murray & the Slackers (2005)
- Peculiar (2006)
- The Boss Harmony Sessions (2007)
- Self Medication (2008)
- Lost and Found (2009)
- The Great Rocksteady Swindle (2010)
- Ganbare! (2011) (Japan only release)
- The Radio (2011)

Side projects

- The Hall Trees - Demo (2011)
