= Close My Eyes (album) =

Studio album by The Slackers
- Released: September 9, 2003
- Genre: Ska
- Length: 47:56
- Label: Hellcat Records
- Producer: ????

The Slackers chronology
| The Slackers and Friends (2002) | Close My Eyes (2003) | International War Criminal (2004) |

Professional ratings
Review scores
| Source | Rating |
|---|---|
| AllMusic | 3/5 stars |
| Punknews.org | 4/5 stars |

Close My Eyes is an album by The Slackers. It was released in 2003.

== Artwork ==
Cover photo references 9/11 in both the mushroom cloud and the newspaper on the table. Interior photographs/design advisor: Denny Renshaw. Cover photo: Jess Paikarovski. Band photos: Lynee Geller. Layout/design: Eddie Ocampo.

== Track listing ==
All songs written by Vic Ruggiero, except where noted.

1. "Shankbön" (Glen Pine) – 3:54
2. "Old Dog" (Dave Hillyard, Ruggiero) – 4:57
3. "Axes" – 3:33
4. "Bin Waiting" (Hillyard, Ruggerio) – 3:57
5. "Real War" (Marq Lyn, The Slackers) – 4:26
6. "Lazy Woman" (Marcus Geard, Ruggerio) – 3:28
7. "Mommy" – 3:01
8. "Don't Wanna Go" – 4:03
9. "Who Knows" – 4:26
10. "Close My Eyes" – 3:45
11. "I'll Stay Away" – 3:52
12. "Decon Dub" (Geard, Hillyard) – 4:28
