= Joe Ferry =

Dr. Joe Ferry is an American record producer, author, bassist, guitarist and educator.

Over the course of his 40-year career, he has produced records and played bass for numerous artists, including The Skatalites, Dr. John, Rhonda Vincent, Eileen Ivers, Nicolette Larson, John Hammond, Sue Foley, Double Trouble, The Roches, The New Orleans Klezmer All-Stars, SKAndalous All-Stars, Uzimon, Joey Ray, Huey Lewis and the News and Delbert McClinton. He has five Grammy Award nominations as producer and one Grammy Award for assisting on the Bunny Wailer album with Shanachie Records, as well as The Chancellor's Award For Teaching Excellence S.U.N.Y., and Best Fiction at the San Francisco Book Festival.

Dr. Ferry holds a Bachelor of Science degree from Long Island University, a Master of Fine Arts degree from SUNY Purchase, and a Ph.D. From Kennedy Western University. He is an emeritus professor at State University of New York at Purchase.

As an educator, Ferry's former students include Regina Spektor, Langhorne Slim, Dan Deacon, Mitski, J-Zone, Elite, Phil "The Butcha" Moffa, Richie Castellano (of Blue Öyster Cult), Jenny Owen Youngs, Bess Rogers, Hanan Rubinstein, Cyrille-Aimee, Dan Romer and many more.

The Big Ska Band, the ska group that Ferry leads, has released several albums on the Jump Up Record label, the most recent of which is entitled Big Ska Band. In 2013, Ferry started his own publishing company and record label, Joe Ferry LLC. His debut novel, Connected: Mob Stories From My Past, received critical acclaim with stellar reviews on amazon.com and the companion CD, Connected: Mob Stories & Reggae Riddims, features tracks by Augustus Pablo, King Tubby, Rita Marley, Victor Rice, The Butcha, Menace, Channel Tubes and The Big Ska Band. Ferry's "Mob Talk" (spoken word) EP has been released. Ferry has written a total of four books, all commercially available and has garnered numerous literary awards.

In addition to Big Ska Band, albums produced by Ferry include The Crux & The Bluestocking by Emily Hope Price. Skankology: The Ultimate Big Ska Band Collection, and the vinyl version of Connected: Mob Stories & Reggae Riddims. Ferry also played bass on "Fall In Line" and "Double EP" by Matt Simons. Ferry's second novel, Connected, Songs My Father Sang, was released in 2014, followed by Highlife (2016) and Gangster Diaries (2019).

Ferry has been touring consistently with Big Ska Band featuring Corey Glover of Living Colour on lead vocals. Since 2019, Joe Ferry has taken over the job of singing lead vocals.

Ferry has recently signed a music publishing agreement with HD Music Now as well as a literary publishing agreement with Fulton Books. His latest book, Cut Me While I'm Hot: Tales from an Unhip Life in an Ultrah-Hip World will be released in early 2021. Several compositions and productions by Ferry will be featured in numerous movies, and TV shows, beginning in 2021.

== Albums ==
- Skallelujah (N-Soul/Electica Records) by Joe Ferry
- Big Ska (Shantytown Records) by Joe Ferry
- Bootleg (Larchmont Recordings) by Big Ska Band
- 55:22 (Shantytown Records) by Joe Ferry
- Big Up (Shantytown Records) by Joe Ferry
- Revival (Jump Up Records) by Big Ska Band
- Carry On (Jump Up Records) by Big Ska Band
- Big Ska Band (Jump Up Records) by Big Ska Band
- Hi-Bop Ska (Shanachie Records) by The Skatalites
- Greetings From Skamania (Shanachie Records) by The Skatalites
- Split Personality (Shanachie Records) by Toots & The Maytals with The Skatalites
- Ska Ska Ska (Shanachie Records) by Prince Buster with The Skatalites
- Bluesiana Triangle (Windham Hill Jazz Records) feat. Dr. John, Art Blakey, David "Fathead" Newman
- Bluesiana II (Windham Hill Jazz Records) feat. Dr. John, David "Fathead" Newman, Will Calhoun
- Bluesiana Hot Sauce (Shanachie Records) feat. Allen Toussaint, Michael Brecker, Toots Thielesmans
- Bluesiana Hurricane (Shanachie Records) feat. Rufus Thomas, Lester Bowie, Bill Doggett, Sue Foley
- People Bet Ready: A Tribute To Curtis Mayfield (Shanachie Records) feat. Huey Lewis & The News
- Back To The Streets (Shanachie Records) feat. Iggy Pop, Corey Glover, Ronnie Wood
- 10 Days In November (Shanachie Records) by Sue Foley
- Tales From The Austin Motel (Shanachie Records) by Debbie Davies Feat. Double Trouble
- Age of Insects by Skandalous Allstars (Shanachie)
- Punk Steady by Skandalous Allstars (Shanachie)
- Hit Me by Skandalous Allstars (Shanachie)
- Musical Barnacles by Perfect Thyroid (Shanachie)
- Call Down The Thunder by Guy Davis (Red House)
- The Black & White EP by Leila (Tape Theory)
- The Crux & The Blue Stocking by Emily Hope Price
- No Trespassing by The Roches (Rhino Records)
- Sunshine on my Back Porch, Various Incl. Rhonda Vincent (Larchmont Records)
- Future Blues, Various Incl. Eileen Ivers, Langhorne Slim (Larchmont Records)
- Who's Snakin' Who? by Syndicate of Soul feat. Dr. John (Shanachie Records)
- Screamin' & Hollerin' The Blues feat. John Hammond (Shanachie Records)
- Chamber Maid - Music of Tool in Baroque (Vitamin/CMH Records)
- Live At The Next Door Cafe by Gil Parris (CMG Records)
- Doctors, Professors, Kings & Queens: The Big Ol' Box of New Orleans, Various Artists (Shout Factory Records)
- Blues For A Sunday Morning by Gil Parris (Shanachie Records)
- Put Some Style In It by The Lounge Brigade (Shanachie Records)
- Soul of R&B Revue, Various Incl. Ben E. King, Cissy Houston, Billy Vera (Shanachie Records)
- Have Yourself A Merry Little Christmas, feat. Dr. John, The Roches, Nicolette Larson (Rhino Records)
