= Peculier =

Peculier may refer to:

- A Peculier is an ecclesiastical district, parish, chapel or church outside the jurisdiction of the bishop of the diocese in which it is situated.
- A Royal Peculier, an area including one or more places of worship under the jurisdiction of the British monarchy
- Old Peculier, is a beer brewed by Theakston Brewery, named in honour of the Peculier of Masham

== See also ==
- Peculiar (disambiguation)
