= Understanding New Jersey & Living in Sin =

Studio album by Vic Ruggiero
- Released: 2001

Vic Ruggiero chronology
Understanding New Jersey & Living in Sin (2001)	This is Special Potatoe, Vol. 1 (2002)

Understanding New Jersey & Living in Sin is the first solo, acoustic album from The Slackers' keyboardist/lead singer Vic Ruggiero. It was released in the US in 2001. In 2006 it was released in Germany/Europe by Moanin'. The reissued version reverses the order of the albums and, as a result, was retitled Living in Sin & Understanding New Jersey.

A personal album expressing Vic's feelings over his mother's continued declining health, various relationships with women- see liner notes for name specifics, and his own battle with the demons of minor fame and alcohol. An album that captures Vic's desire to emulate both Jack Kerouac and Bob Dylan.

== Track listing ==
=== Understanding New Jersey & Living in Sin ===
1. Papa Told Me (2:54)
2. Intro (0:40)
3. Sole Are Fish for Boots (3:30)
4. Out of My Window (4:56)
5. Sunday (4:26)
6. Tree City, USA (1:41)
7. This (2:31)
8. Neatly (3:21)
9. I Didn't Think (2:42)
10. To Redeem (2:43)
11. Junkie Parents (2:50)
12. Emelia (2:02)
13. A New Reflection (4:32)
14. 23rd and 2nd (3:28)
15. Monday (2:38)
16. Jimmy (2:56)
17. My Question (4:00)
18. Do You Good (2:12)
19. The Cat (2:44)

=== Living in Sin & Understanding New Jersey ===
1. Emelia (2:02)
2. A New Reflection (4:32)
3. 23rd and 2nd (3:28)
4. Monday (2:38)
5. Jimmy (2:56)
6. My Question (4:00)
7. Do You Good (2:12)
8. The Cat (2:44)
9. Papa Told Me (2:54)
10. Intro (0:40)
11. Sole Are Fish for Boots (3:30)
12. Out of My Window (4:56)
13. Sunday (4:26)
14. Tree City, USA (1:41)
15. This (2:31)
16. Neatly (3:21)
17. I Didn't Think (2:42)
18. To Redeem (2:43)
19. Junkie Parents (2:50)
