= Hepcat (band) =

Ska and reggae band from California

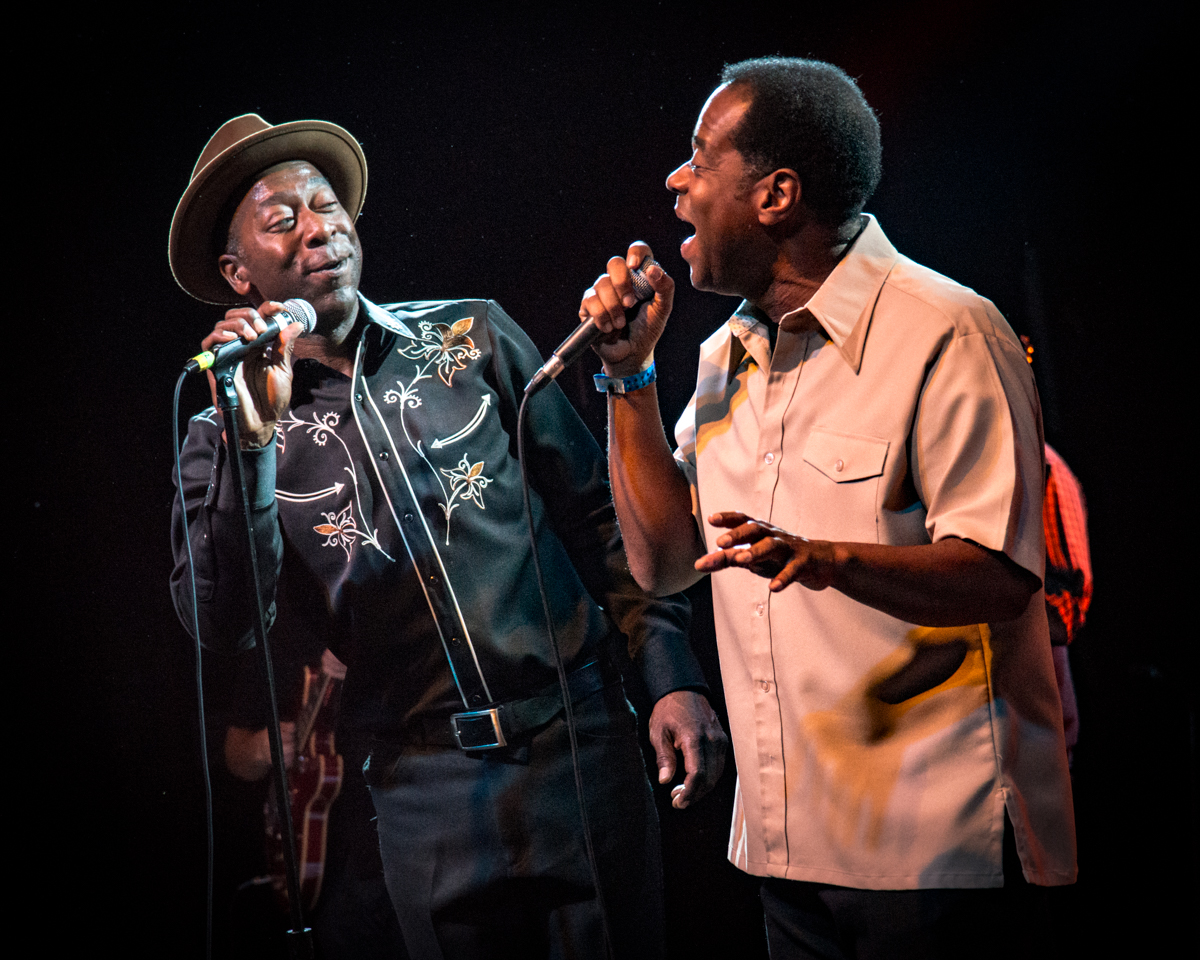

Background information
- Origin: California, United States
- Genres: Ska, rocksteady, reggae, ska-jazz, soul, R&B
- Years active: 1989–2000, 2003–present
- Labels: BYO, Moon Ska, Hellcat
- Members: Alex Désert; Deston Berry; Efren Santana; Kincaid Smith; Lino Trujillo; Greg Narvas
- Past members: Greg Lee; David Fuentes; Joey "Pepe" Urquijo; Raul Talavera; Lino Trujillo; Dave Hillyard; Joey Aguilera; Jeremiah Ben Zion; Dennis Wilson; Aaron Owens; Chris Castanon; Scott Abels

Hepcat is a ska and reggae band formed in southern California in 1989. Their soulful harmonies and mellow rhythms were unlike those of contemporaries and more akin to musicians from the heyday of 1960s Jamaican ska (also referred to as the first wave) with elements of soul, jazz and R&B.

== Career ==
Hepcat's debut album, Out of Nowhere was released in 1993 on the New York-based ska label Moon Records. Two years later, they followed it up with Scientific on BYO Records. In 1998, after signing with Epitaph Records subsidiary HellCat Records, they released Right on Time, scoring a modest hit with the swinging "No Worries" and scored a spot on the Vans Warped Tour. 2000 saw the release of Push n' Shove, their first album without founding members Raul Talavera and Alex Désert, although the latter appears as a guest vocalist on two tracks. He rejoined the band in 2003.

By the early 2000s, the ska scene became oversaturated and commercially less interesting, so the band was dropped by their label. Hepcat went on a hiatus, then reunited in 2003 and continued touring. In 2007, the long-time bassist David Fuentes died, which resulted in the band being less active again. In 2015, the guitarist Aaron Owens died as well. Hepcat continues performing at concerts and festivals, but infrequently.

A few members of Hepcat have also participated in other endeavors. Trumpeter Kincaid Smith formed Soul Traffic, a five-piece funk band. Vocalist Alex Désert has had a successful career in film and television, appearing in the movies PCU, Swingers, and High Fidelity; and the television shows Boy Meets World and Becker.

The term "Hepcat" originates from an early slang term (1930–35) pertaining to an admirer or devotee of jazz, esp. swing, or one that was "hep", or a hipster. The band is actually named after a cat once owned by vocalist Alex Desért, named "Hep."

Singer Greg Lee suffered a massive brain aneurysm and cardiac arrest at his home on March 17, 2024, and was pronounced dead in the hospital two days later on March 19, 2024, at the age of 53.

== Discography ==
- Out of Nowhere (1993), Moon Ska Records
- Scientific (1996), BYO Records
- Right on Time (1998), Hellcat Records
- Push 'n Shove (2000), Hellcat Records
- Out of Nowhere (Hellcat re-release with two bonus tracks) (2004)
- Live at The Whiskey a Go-Go (2011), Whatevski Records

== Band members ==
Current members

- Alex Désert – vocals
- Deston Berry – keys and vocals
- Efren Santana – tenor sax (joined on Scientific)
- Kincaid Smith – trumpet, flugelhorn (joined on Scientific)
- Lino Trujillo – guitar (from Scientific)
- Greg Narvas – drums and percussion (Out of Nowhere and Scientific)

Former members

- Greg Lee – vocals (died in 2024)
- David Fuentes – bass, E. upright (died in 2007)
- Aaron Owens – guitar (credited as an additional musician on Right on Time, joined on Push n' Shove) (died in 2015)
- Joey "Pepe" Urquijo – bass ("Nigel" and "Club Meditation" — first single)
- Raul Talavera – alto sax (through Right on Time)
- Dave Hillyard – tenor sax (Out of Nowhere)
- Joey Aguilera – guitar (Scientific Tour)
- Dennis Wilson – guitar (Out of Nowhere)
- Jeremiah BenZion (Settles) – tenor sax (Out of Nowhere)
- Chris Castanon – drums (in between Scientific and Push n' Shove)
- Scott Abels – drums and percussion (credited as an additional musician on Right on Time, joined on Push n' Shove)
