= The Question (The Slackers album) =

Studio album by The Slackers
- Released: 1998
- Genre: Ska
- Length: 68:02
- Label: Hellcat Records
- Producer: Vic Ruggiero

The Slackers chronology
| Redlight (1997) | The Question (1998) | Wasted Days (2001) |

Professional ratings
Review scores
| Source | Rating |
|---|---|
| AllMusic | 4/5 stars |

The Question is an album by the Slackers. It was released on November 20, 1998 (see 1998 in music), on Hellcat Records. The record is dedicated to Tommy McCook and Dick Qualiana.

== Track listing ==
All songs written by Vic Ruggiero, except where noted.

1. "Manuel" – 2:42
2. "Knowing" – 2:53
3. "Have the Time" – 3:07
4. "And I Wonder?" (Dave Hillyard, Ruggiero) – 3:49
5. "No More Crying" – 4:32
6. "Feed My Girl" (Marcus Geard, Marq Lyn) – 3:39
7. "Mountainside" (Glen Pine) – 2:47
8. "The Mummy" – 3:21
9. "Motor City" (Hillyard, Ruggerio) – 4:00
10. "Power" (Hillyard, Ruggerio, Lyn) – 4:26
11. "Keep Him Away" – 2:49
12. "The Question" – 3:59
13. "The Question (Version)" – 4:04
14. "Face in My Crowd" (Hillyard, Ruggerio) – 3:13
15. "Do You Know" (Luis Zuluaga) – 3:10
16. "Yes It's True" – 4:16
17. "Alone Again" – 3:02
18. "Make Me Smile" (T.J. Scanlon) – 4:20
19. "No Love" (Hillyard) – 3:53
