= Self Medication (album) =

Studio album by The Slackers
- Released: 2008
- Genre: Ska
- Length: 42:15
- Label: Indication Records
- Producer: Vic Ruggiero assisted by Glen Pine

The Slackers chronology
The Boss Harmony Sessions (2007)	Self Medication (2008)	The Great Rocksteady Swindle (2010)

Professional ratings
Review scores
Source	Rating
AbsolutePunk.net	82% link
AllMusic	4/5 stars

Self Medication is an album by the New York City ska band The Slackers. It was released on Indication Records in 2008 (See 2008 in music).

== Track listing ==
1. "Every Day Is Sunday" (Geard) – 2:35
2. "Don't You Want a Man" (Hillyard) – 3:30
3. "Don't Forget the Streets" (Ruggiero) – 3:26
4. "Estranged" (Pine) – 3:52
5. "Stars" (Ruggiero) – 4:29
6. "Leave Me" (Nugent) – 2:58
7. "Eviction" (Pine) – 4:54
8. "Happy Song" (Hillyard) – 2:21
9. "Self Medication" (Ruggiero/Nugent) – 4:11
10. "Don't Have To" (Geard) – 2:03
11. "Walking with Myself" (Hillyard/Ruggiero) – 4:05
12. "Sing Your Song" (Ruggiero) – 3:51

== Personnel ==
=== Players ===
- Ara Babajian – drums
- Marcus Geard – bass
- David Hillyard – saxophone
- Jay Nugent – guitar, sitar
- Glen Pine – trombone, vocals, percussion
- Vic Ruggiero – organ, piano, vocals, harmonica, banjo, guitar, accordion, percussion

=== Additional Players ===
- Glen Hackett – drums on 2, 3, 8, 9, 10
- Ben Lewis – trumpet on 3, 9, 10
- Rolf Langsjoen – trumpet on 3, 5
- Rob Jost – French horn on 3, 12
- Jeremy Meyers – vocals on 3, 8
- Martin Scaiff – clarinet on 9
