= The Rocksteady Seven =

American Ska and Jazz band

Rocksteady 7
- David Hillyard & the Rocksteady 7 live at Two Boots Brooklyn

Background information
- Origin: New York, New York
- Genres: Reggae, rocksteady, Jamaican jazz
- Years active: 1992–present
- Labels: Brixton Records, Hellcat, Do Tell Records
- Members: Dave Hillyard; Larry McDonald; Will Clark; Jeremy Mushlin; Mike Bitz; Dave Hahn; Eddie Ocampo; Dave Wake
- Past members: Sheldon Gregg; Jayson "Agent Jay" Nugent; Victor Ruggiero; David Hahn; Chris "Squantch" Sears; Rolf Langsjoen; Kincaid Smith; Christian Vela; Jimmy Boom; Clint Sobolik; Charlie Francis
- Website: www.rocksteady7.com

The Rocksteady 7 also known as David Hillyard & the Rocksteady Seven, are an American Ska and Jazz band from New York, New York that formed in 1992. Since the early 1990s the group has consisted of tenor saxophonist and band leader Dave Hillyard as well as percussionist Larry McDonald. In live performances, they are supported by a rotating cast of musicians, including drummer Eddie Ocampo and Dave Wake on keys among others.

Given reggae's globally reaching influence, the Rocksteady 7 holds true to the genre's roots and the self-described "Jamaican Jazz" sound combines ska, rocksteady and reggae with extended jazz improvisation, intricate melodies, and complex harmonies. The group incorporates many diverse elements of world music with rocksteady rhythms, including ska, jazz, calypso, as well as early African and American jazz influences.

As of late 2012, the Rocksteady has released seven studio albums and has seen some success, particularly in Europe and on United States college radio stations. They are currently signed to Brixton Records with previous releases on Hellcat and Do Tell Records.

== Biography ==
David Hillyard & the Rocksteady 7 are innovators in the Jamaican Jazz genre, which experiments in mixing jazz, reggae, Latin, and ska. The group features a shifting collective of some of the best musicians in New York City with experience playing with a variety of musical acts from Sting to the Skatalites.

Senior among them is veteran percussionist, Larry McDonald on Congo. Larry began his career at the inception of ska music with Carlos Malcolm's Afro Jamaicans. McDonald went on to perform on several classic reggae tracks such as Cherry Oh Baby, Funky Kingston and Rivers of Babylon. He left Jamaica after playing on several crucial Bob Marley cuts and has since backed up American icons, from Taj Mahal, Gil-Scott Heron, Bad Brains and Dave Hahn, earning him the sometime nickname “Original Beatnik”.

Blending ska, reggae, jazz and blues, David Hillyard and The Rocksteady 7 has championed the style of mixing Jamaican Rhythms and American Jazz, celebrating commonalities between improvised foundation ska, roots reggae, and Latin jazz played by an accomplished and diverse line-up. "I picked the musicians for their personal style," says Hillyard. "I want them to be themselves and make a soup. This recording is all live, no overdubs."

=== 1992–2007: Career beginnings ===
The music of the Rocksteady 7 bridges the divide once thought to exist between early instrumental Jamaican “roots” rhythms ala the Skatalites, Burning Spear, Rocksteady Freddie and early American Jazz ala David Murray, Charlie Haden, Sidney Bichet and Pharaoh Saunders. Reminiscent of sounds from the 1940s and 60s, the group fuses Latin American and jazz elements in their music, which is also influenced by Afro-Cuban mambo and Brazilian bossa nova. The colorful mix of work songs, calls, field and street cries, hollers, rhyme songs, and spirituals taken on by Hillyard and his group changed the format of reggae and jazz, respectively; By bringing the soloist to the forefront, during live shows and in his recording groups, they demonstrated that jazz improvisation could go far beyond ornamenting a simple melody, and his motto "improvise and overcome" showcases the talents of individual players, resulting in tenser rhythms and more complicated textures.

The 1999's release, Playtime is a lively, celebratory mix of early American Jazz and world music. The band's second album, United Front, released in 2003 contains stronger political undertones and uses the hypnotizing percussive base of the conga as a launching pad for an impressive mix of guitar and horn solos that weave in and out of the hypnotic groove laid down by the rhythm section. This album mixes free improvisation, reggae and revolutionary rhetoric to create "a true movement in the ska scene".

=== 2008–present: "Way Out East" and beyond ===
In 2007, the Rocksteady 7 released their 3rd album, Way Out East (Brixton), which was recorded at a club in Jena, Germany during a 2004 tour and captured the powerful energy of the band as a dynamic and inspiring live act noted as a perfect Jazz/Reggae fusion that will leave fans of both in a "state of bliss."

In 2009, the band released Get Back Up! (Brixton).

In 2015, filmmaker Rickard P. Keeshan did a documentary short on David Hillyard & The Rocksteady Seven titled "Trouble Sleep."

In 2022, they came out with anew album called Plague Doctor.

== Discography ==
- Playtime – (1999), Hellcat Records
- United Front – (2003), Do Tell Records / Brixton Records
- Way out East: Live at The Kassablanca – (2007), Brixton Records
- Get Back Up! – (2009), Brixton Records
- Giver - (2018)
- Plague Doctor - (2022), Org Music
- Home For Dinner - (2026)

== Rocksteady 7 members ==
- Dave Hillyard – saxophone
- Larry McDonald – percussion
- Will Clark – trombone
- Jeremy Mushlin – trumpet
- Mike Bitz – bass guitar
- Vic Ruggiero – piano
- Dave Hahn – guitar
- Eddie Ocampo – drums
- Dave Wake – organ
