= Glen Brown =

Jamaican musician (died 2019)

- Born: Glenmore Lloyd Brown; 1943 or 1944; Kingston, Jamaica
- Origin: Jamaica
- Died: 4 October 2019 (aged 75) New York City
- Genre: Reggae
- Occupation: Musician
- Years active: 1960s–2019
- Labels: Pantomine, South East Music

Glenmore Lloyd Brown (1943 or 1944 – 4 October 2019), also known as "God Son" and "The Rhythm Master", was a Jamaican singer, musician, and record producer, working primarily in the genres of reggae and dub.

== Biography ==
Born in Kingston, Brown began his musical career in the 1960s as vocalist with Sonny Bradshaw's jazz group, subsequently recording duets with Hopeton Lewis, Lloyd Robinson and Dave Barker for producers such as Duke Reid and Coxsone Dodd.

In the early 1970s, he began working as a producer, initially for the Shalimar label, and recorded Augustus Pablo-influenced melodica tracks, such as 1972's "Merry Up". He also recorded for Prince Buster, Leslie Kong, and Derrick Harriott. He formed two record labels; Pantomine [sic], and South East Music, and produced tracks by U Roy, Gregory Isaacs, Big Youth, I-Roy, Prince Jazzbo, Johnny Clarke, Lloyd Parks, and Little Roy.

Due to low funds, his early releases were pressed in limited runs, but were revered by collectors in Europe and the United States. Although he had fewer hits in the latter half of the 1970s, he maintained his profile with hits from the likes of Wayne Jarrett and Sylford Walker. Brown moved to the USA in the early 1980s.

In 1988, London's Greensleeves Records issued an album of Sylford Walker recordings produced by Brown entitled Lambs Bread, followed in 1989 by three further compilations of productions from the Pantomine label. More reissues followed in the 1990s, with ROIR's 1995 The Way To Mount Zion featuring material from the 1969–1976 period and Blood & Fire's 1996 Termination Dub, featuring material recorded with King Tubby between 1973 and 1979.

In 2000, Germany's Select Cuts label released Glen Brown remixes by Small Axe Vs Terminal Head and Pressure Drop, followed in 2001 by two remixes of Sylford Walkers "Lambsbread" by Leftfield and Nick Manasseh. In 2002, Glen Brown's single produced by Ras Kush, "We Dem A Watch", was the first release on New York's Black Redemption label.

In 2010 Brown was admitted to a New York nursing home, suffering from renal failure, diabetes, loss of vision, dementia, and a heart condition. He did not benefit greatly from sales of his recordings, limiting the treatment that he could receive. He died at the Far Rockaway Center for Rehabilitation and Nursing in New York City on 4 October 2019, at the age of 75.

== Reception and legacy ==
The three Greensleeves compilations Boat To Progress, Check the Winner and Dubble Attack were included in the book Reggae on CD: The Essential Guide.

Termination Dub was included in Reggae: 100 Essential CDs.

== Partial album discography ==
=== As musician ===
- Glen Brown Sings, Melodica Talks (Number One Sound) (1988, Pantomine Records, PRLP444)
- Glen Brown Plays Music From The East (1990, Fashion Records)
- Mike Brooks and Glen Brown Meet Rhythm Foundation ina Sound Clash (1990, Rhythm Foundation) with Mike Brooks
- Cotton Style (1990) South East – with Joseph Cotton, credited to 'Joseph Cotton and the Lord Son'

=== As producer ===
- Lamb's Bread – Sylford Walker (1988, Greensleeves)
- Dubble Attack: The Original Pantomine DJ Collection 1972–74 (1989, Greensleeves)
- Boat To Progress: The Original Pantomine Vocal Collection 1970–74 (1989, Greensleeves)
- Check the Winner: The Original Pantomine Instrumental Collection 1970–74 (1989, Greensleeves, GREL603), (1990, Shanachie, SH 47007)
- Horny Dub (1989, Grounation)
- Ghetto Man Corner - Welton Irie (1990, Pantomine Records)
- Dub From The South East (1991, Pantomine Records, PRLP02)
- Termination Dub – Glen Brown and King Tubby (1996, Blood & Fire, BAFCD015)
- The Way to Mount Zion (1998, ROIR, RUSCD8215)
- Lambs Bread International - Sylford Walker & Welton Irie (2000, Blood & Fire, BAFCD033)
- Rhythm Master Volume One (2004, Hot Pot, HPCD1001)
- Rhythm Master Volume Two (2005, Hot Pot, HPCD1003)
- Green Bay Killing (Pantomine)
- Dirty Harry – Version Excursion (2005, Hot Pot, HPLP1001)

== See also ==
- Jammyland
- Hot Pot Music
- Blood and Fire (record label)
- I-Roy
