= Redlight (The Slackers album) =

Studio album by The Slackers
- Released: 1997
- Genre: Ska
- Length: 46:53
- Label: Hellcat Records

The Slackers chronology
Better Late Than Never (1996)	Redlight (1997)	The Question (1998)

Professional ratings
Review scores
Source	Rating
The Gazette	8/10

Redlight is an album by the Slackers, released in 1997.

The band promoted the album by touring as part of the NYC Ska Mob Tour '97. The opening track is a tribute to Tommy McCook.

== Critical reception ==
The Washington Post thought that the Slackers "are clearly as interested in ska's jazz roots as its R&B ones." The Gazette concluded that "the ska tempo is slackened, proclaiming Jamaican independence while lowering tariff walls for reggae, dub, R&B, soul, jazz and boogaloo." The Dallas Observer wrote that the album takes the listener on a musical tour "of the studios of Jamaica, the tiny clubs of London, the streets of New York, and the barrios of Los Angeles."

The Deseret News listed the album as one of the best of 1997, writing: "Outside of the Skatalites, the only band that can do traditional ska." The Orange County Register also considered it to be one of 1997's best albums, writing that "Married Girl", a "Double Indemnity-style tale of lustful revenge, is a killer."

== Track listing ==
All songs written by Vic Ruggiero, except where noted.

1. "Cooking for Tommy" (Dave Hillyard, Ruggiero) – 3:58
2. "Watch This" – 3:58
3. "Married Girl" – 3:11
4. "I Still Love You" (Hillyard, Ruggiero) – 3:15
5. "Soldier" – 2:55
6. "Fried Chicken/Mary Mary" – 3:28
7. "You Must Be Good" – 3:55
8. "Redlight" (The Slackers) – 4:58
9. "Tin Tin Deo" (Gil Fuller, Chano Pozo) – 3:47
10. "She Wants to Be Alone" (Toots Hibbert, Jeremy Mushlin) – 4:28
11. "Rude and Reckless" – 4:36
12. "Come Back Baby" – 4:15
