= Live at Ernesto's =

Live album by The Slackers
- Released: May 9, 2000
- Recorded: March 1999
- Genre: Ska
- Length: 62:03
- Label: Hellcat Records

The Slackers chronology
Before There Were Slackers There Were... (1999)	Live at Ernesto's (2000)	Wasted Days (2001)

Professional ratings
Review scores
Source	Rating
Allmusic	4/5 stars
Kerrang!	1/5 stars

Live At Ernesto's is an album by The Slackers released in 2000 by Hellcat Records. The album was recorded live March 8 and 9, 1999 at a restaurant called Ernesto's in Sittard, the Netherlands.

== Artwork ==
Interior artwork features two collages. Collages appear to be a collection of tour photos and mementos. The photographs are by Denny Renshaw, and have been assembled and rephotographed by him. The cover features the first departure from the "Wix series" of covers (Better Late Than Never through The Question).

== Track listing ==
1. "Intro" – 0:16
2. "Sooner or Later" – 4:00
3. "Married Girl" – 3:15
4. "Do You Know" – 3:08
5. "Sarah" – 3:46
6. "Mush One" – 1:21
7. "I Still Love You" – 3:16
8. "Soldier" – 2:59
9. "Keep Him Away" – 2:47
10. "Work Song" – 6:07
11. "Feed My Girl" – 3:43
12. "Face In My Crowd" – 3:34
13. "You Don't Know I" – 7:18
14. "Pedophilia" – 6:23
15. "Runaway" – 4:12
16. "The Fried Chicken Song" – 5:51
