= Wasted Days =

Studio album by The Slackers
- Released: February 20, 2001
- Recorded: 2000
- Genre: Ska
- Length: 67:00
- Label: Hellcat

The Slackers chronology
Live at Ernesto's (2000)	Wasted Days (2001)	The Slackers and Friends (2002)

Professional ratings
Review scores
Source	Rating
AllMusic	4/5 stars

Wasted Days is an album by the ska/reggae band The Slackers, released on February 21, 2001 on Hellcat Records. Unlike other releases by the Slackers, the songs on the vinyl LP version of the album differ significantly from their counterparts on the CD release; additionally, there are several tracks unique to the vinyl release. The CD edition of the album features a cover of the Bon Jovi song, "Wanted Dead or Alive".

== Artwork ==
The album concept is that of a comic book. The girl on the cover (Miki Stroman) is reading a comic entitled Wasted Days. The band is featured on the inside jacket speaking with dialog boxes like that of a comic book. With the exception of the song titles, the artwork for both the CD and vinyl versions is the same. Photo credit belongs to Denny Renshaw and the Wasted Days comic was created by Adrienne Vander Ploeg.

== CD tracks ==
All songs written by Vic Ruggiero, except where noted.

1. "Wasted Days" (Marcus Geard) – 4:08
2. "Henderson Swamp" – 2:42
3. "Please Decide" – 3:11
4. "Pets of the World" (The Slackers) – 4:18
5. "Dave's Friend" (Dave Hillyard, Ruggiero) – 4:54
6. "So This Is the Night" – 3:49
7. "Made Up My Mind" (Hillyard, Ruggiero) – 3:54
8. "Sermon" – 2:31
9. "The Nurse" – 3:25
10. "Old Days" (Hillyard, Ruggiero) – 5:40
11. "Midnight Rendezvous" (Glen Pine) – 4:44
12. "Tales of the Mongoose" (The Slackers) – 3:54
13. "Easy" – 3:55
14. "Walking On" – 6:11
15. "Wanted Dead or Alive" (Jon Bon Jovi and Richie Sambora) – 3:53
16. "Information Error" (Hillyard, Ruggiero) – 6:12

== Vinyl tracks ==
1. "This Is the Night" (alternate version) – 3:29
2. "Don't Break My Heart" – 4:01
3. "Fifteen" – 3:20
4. "Information Error" (alternate version) – 4:51
5. "Wasted Days" (extended version with dub) – 6:35
6. "Tales of the Rugaroo" (remix of "Tales of the Mongoose") – 7:09
7. "A Fifth of Slack" (remix of "Made Up My Mind") – 3:57
8. "Old Days" (alternate version) – 5:44
9. "Remember When" – 5:02
