= Eddie Ocampo =

American drummer

- Genres: Ska
- Occupation: Drummer

Eddie Ocampo is a drummer of the Third Wave Ska movement. He performed in several bands, such as The Insteps, Stubborn All-Stars, Dave Hillyard Rocksteady 7, the Jammyland All Stars, the Fandanglers, and many more Ska and Version City related bands. Ocampo has also designed album art for artists such as The Slackers.

He lives in Windsor Terrace, Brooklyn, NY, and plays in The Full Watts Band.
