= Bree Kristel Clarke =

Australian photographer

- Known for: portrait
- Website: breekristelclarke.com

Bree Kristel Clarke is an Australian-born music/celebrity portrait photographer who has starred in VH1 and MTV reality shows.

She was a tour manager for Skrillex She shot a PSA for Tom DeLonge.
