= 1998 (disambiguation) =

1998 was a common year starting on Thursday of the Gregorian calendar.

1998 may also refer to:

- 1998 (number)
- "1998" (instrumental), a track by Binary Finary
- "1998" (Chet Faker song), 2014
