= Ska jazz =

Music genre

Ska-Jazz
- Stylistic origins: Ska, jazz
- Cultural origins: Late 1950s, Jamaica

Ska jazz is a music genre derived by fusing the melodic content of jazz with the rhythmic and harmonic content of early Jamaican Music introduced by the "Fathers of Ska" in the late 1950s. The ska-jazz movement began during the 1990s in New York and London, where pioneering avant-garde jazz and reggae musicians pushed the boundaries of reggae music. They were combining traditions with modern elements, using the reggae beat along with high improvisation and jazz harmonies, primarily by horns and percussion.

== Origins ==
The term Ska-Jazz was coined by Rock Steady Freddie (Fred Reiter) of the New York Ska-Jazz Ensemble in 1994. Ska jazz is sometimes considered a subgenre of third wave ska, but early artists such as Tommy McCook considered themselves jazz musicians foremost. Before Rock Steady Freddie, Ska-Jazz was just another flare of jazz without its own name. Jazz improvisation is commonly used in Ska jazz. Ska Jazz bands usually contain one or two electric guitars, a bass guitar, keyboards, a drum kit and a horn section (composed of any combination of the following: trumpet, trombone, alto saxophone, tenor saxophone, and baritone saxophone). Occasionally there may be one or more vocalists, but the genre is primarily focused on instrumental tunes. The brass instruments usually carry the melody, and there are many improvised solos. The rhythm section places accents on the off beats, thus giving the music a different feel than straight jazz.

Ever since its birth in the late 1950s, ska has been a genre marked by physical and cultural diasporas and an openness to borrowing from outside its origins. The history of ska and jazz combined travels across national borders and integrates with other musical styles, making it one of the most hybrid, transnational forms of postwar popular music.

== Early Jamaican Jazzmen ==
- The Skatalites
- Tommy McCook
- Roland Alphonso
- Don Drummond
- Ernest Ranglin
- Jackie Mittoo
- Rico Rodriguez

== Notable artists ==
- Jazz Jamaica
- The Orobians
- Victor Rice
- Rotterdam Ska-Jazz Foundation
- Saint Petersburg Ska-Jazz Review
- David Hillyard And The Rocksteady Seven
- The Cat Empire
- New York Ska-Jazz Ensemble
- Tokyo Ska Paradise Orchestra
- Melbourne Ska Orchestra
- Quito Ska Jazz
- Kingston Rudieska
- Montréal Ska-Jazz Ensemble
- The Articles
- Satelite Kingston
