= Dave Hillyard =

American saxophonist

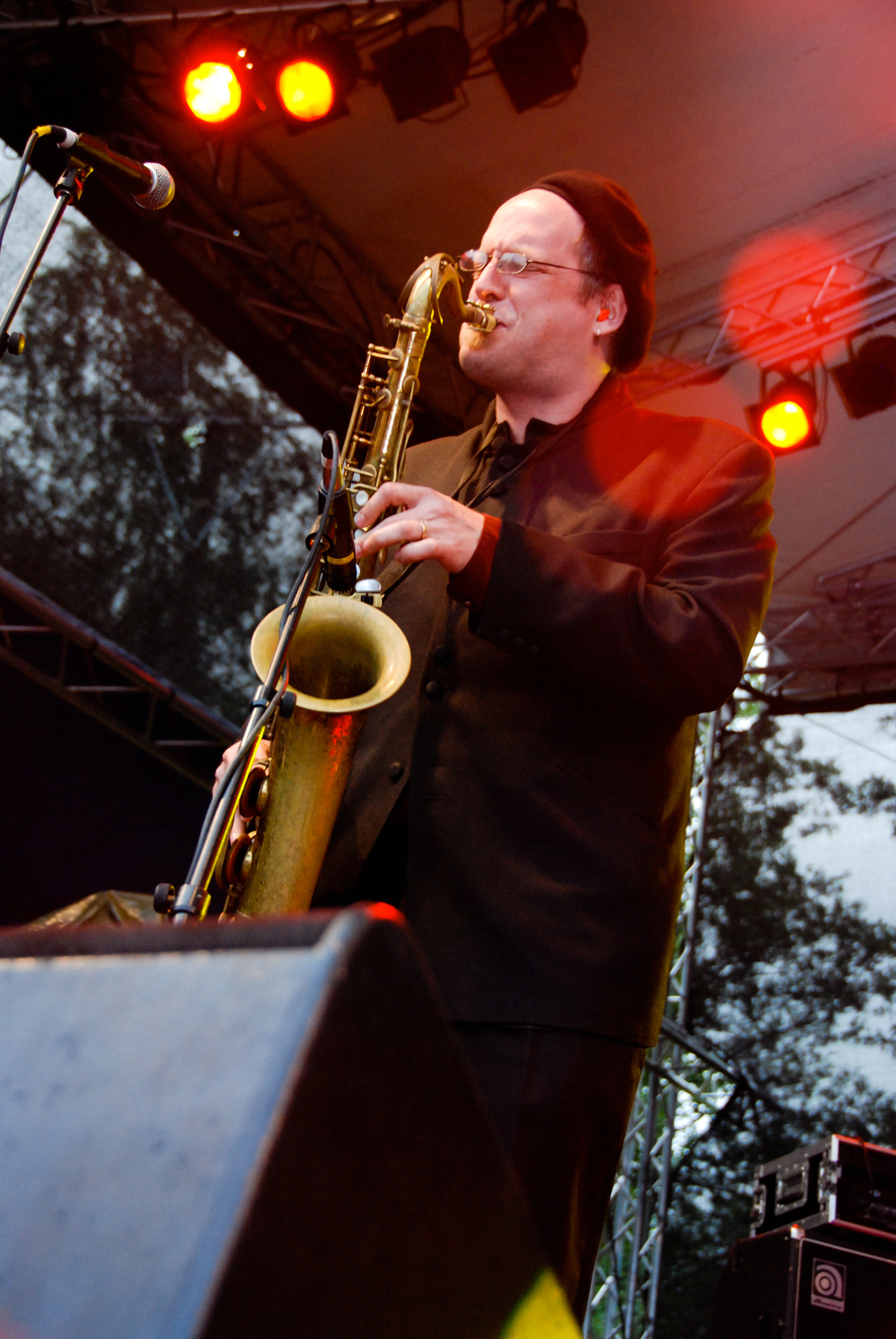
- Hillyard performing at Ilosaarirock festival on 15 July 2007 in Joensuu, Finland.

Background information
- Born: David Hillyard
- Origin: San Diego, California
- Genres: Reggae; ska; rocksteady
- Occupations: Musician, songwriter
- Instruments: Tenor Saxophone, Soprano Saxophone
- Years active: 1986–present
- Labels: Hellcat; Special Potatoe; Do Tell; Moon Ska; Brixton
- Website: theslackers.com

Dave Hillyard is a tenor saxophonist originating from San Diego, California. He has performed in groups such as The Slackers, The Rocksteady Seven, The Donkey Show, Hepcat, Stubborn All-Stars, and has guested with the likes of Rancid, Victor Rice, Skinnerbox NYC and Alexandra Lawerentz. He is a skilled improviser and composer/arranger with more than thirty album credits to his name.

== Biography ==
Tenor and soprano saxophonist David Hillyard has been a professional musician for over 30 years, and is one of the innovators of the American ska, jazz and reggae scene. The musician-arranger-composer has been instrumental in creating and re-popularizing the sound of "Jamaican Rock n Roll" and "Ska Jazz".

At 17 years old, Hillyard played with The Donkey Show, one of California’s pioneering ska bands. He also played with Hepcat, which went on to become one of the biggest ska acts of the 1990s. He has also performed with ska groups like the Stubborn All-Stars, reggae artists like Cornell Campbell, Congo ‘Ashanti’ Roy and Johnny Osbourne, jazz artists like Roy Campbell, Jr., blues artists like Simon Chardiet, and even soul singers like Archie Bell, although he is best known for his work with the Slackers beginning in 1991. He continues to be a key member of that organization and has appeared on their 10 cd releases and thousands of live gigs, currently averaging about 120-150 gigs a year in the USA, Canada, Japan, Latin America and Europe.

== Discography ==
=== With The Rocksteady Seven ===
- Playtime - (1999), Hellcat Records
- United Front - (2003), Do Tell Records
- Way out East: Live at The Kassablanca - (2007), Brixton Records
- Get Back Up! - (2009), Brixton Records
- The Giver - (2018), ORG Music
- Plague Doctor - (2022), ORG Music

=== With Glen Adams ===
- Plays Hits of Jackpot - (2008), Ska In The World, Japan

=== With The Slackers ===
- Better Late Than Never - (1996), Moon Ska Records
- Redlight - (1997), Hellcat Records
- The Question - (1998), Hellcat Records
- Live at Ernesto's - (2000), Hellcat Records
- Wasted Days - (2001), Hellcat Records
- The Slackers and Friends - (2002), Special Potatoe Records
- Close My Eyes - (2003), Hellcat Records
- Upsettin' Ernesto's - (2004), Music Machine Records
- International War Criminal - (2004), Thought Squad Records
- The Slackers/Pulley Split - (2004), Do Tell Records
- An Afternoon in Dub - (2005)
- Slack in Japan - (2005)
- Slackness - (2005), Ska In The World Records
- Peculiar - (2006), Hellcat Records
- Big Tunes! Hits & Misses from 1996 to 2006 - (2007), Disk Union Records
- The Boss Harmony Sessions (2007)
- Self Medication (2008)
- The Great Rocksteady Swindle (2010)
- The Slackers (2016), Brainlab Groove

=== With Hepcat ===
- Out of Nowhere - (1993), Moon Ska Records

=== With Stubborn All-Stars ===
- Open Season - (1995), Stubborn Records
- Back With A New Batch - (1997), Stubborn Records

=== With The Donkey Show ===
- Bali Island - (1988)
- The Ska Parade: Runnin' Naked Thru The Cornfield - (1997)
- Just Can't Get Enough Of... — (2000)
