= Ara Babajian =

American drummer

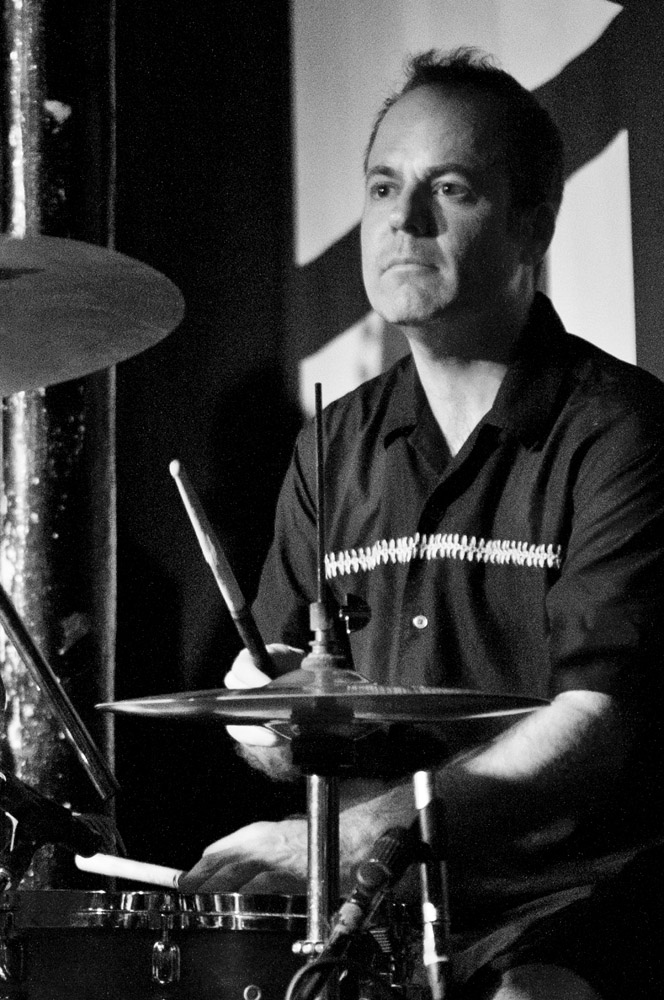
- Ara Babajian of The Slackers performing in Bristol on 11 July 2014.

Background information
- Also known as: Ara Babajian, Ara Crack
- Born: Kenneth Ara Babajian; July 9, 1972 (age 54)
- Origin: Hollywood, California, United States
- Genres: Ska, Punk, Reggae, Soft rock, Punk metal
- Occupations: Musician, Songwriter
- Instrument: Drums
- Years active: 1987–present
- Labels: Hellcat Records, Fat Wreck Chords, Alternative Tentacles, Moon Ska Records
- Member of: The Slackers
- Formerly of: Leftöver Crack; World/Inferno Friendship Society; Star Fucking Hipsters; The Trick Babys; Agent 99
- Website: The Slackers, Leftöver Crack

Ara Babajian (born July 9, 1972) is an American drummer who has been a member of such bands as Leftöver Crack and The Slackers.

== Etymology ==
Ara is of Armenian descent and is named after Ara, an Armenian king.

== Career ==
Together with Dunia Best, Jay Nugent and Alec Baillie he started the third wave ska band Agent 99 in the early nineties. In 1998, they released the compilation album Little Pieces (1993–1995).

In April 2000, Babajian joined Baillie to play drums in Leftöver Crack under the pseudonym "Ara Crack" until 2002. In early 2003, Ara joined The Slackers. In 2005, he rejoined Leftover Crack, though he is no longer an active member. He is also a former member of The World/Inferno Friendship Society.

Ara Babajian has played in a number of other bands, including King Django, Ruder Than You, The Trick Babys, Skandalous All Stars (a ska supergroup featuring several members of the Slackers), and Sic & Mad.

He is an endorser of Pro-Mark Drumsticks

He was also the original drummer of the Star Fucking Hipsters.

During the 80's, Ara also played drums in the funky-style band Das Booty with Brian Pitts on bass, Matthew Moreno on Horns (for a short time), Michael Cardenas on guitar and James Boyce on vocals. Demos of this band were to later circulate on YouTube mistakenly as lost Red Hot Chili Peppers recordings. It was eventually cleared up and credit has been given to Das Booty.
