= The Slackers and Friends =

Studio album by The Slackers
- Released: November 2002
- Genre: Ska
- Length: 58:19
- Label: Special Potato Records

The Slackers chronology
Wasted Days (2001)	The Slackers and Friends (2002)	Close My Eyes (2003)

Re-release cover

The Slackers and Friends is an album by the ska/reggae band The Slackers. It saw limited release in November 2002, and was later re-released with two additional tracks on January 27, 2004.

The album consists of collaborations with various figures from the ska and reggae scenes, including Cornell Campbell, Glen Adams of The Upsetters, Ari Up of the Slits, Doreen Shaffer of the Skatalites, and acoustic ska artist Chris Murray. The original edition of the album also featured an eight-minute-long hidden track (a remix of the album's other songs) by DJ Cris the Reducer. On the re-release, this was replaced by two additional tracks written and recorded by Susan Cadogan. Several of the songs are remixes of previously recorded Slackers songs, while others are unique to this album.

== Track listing ==
1. "Come Come" (featuring Cornell Campbell) – 3:25
2. "Mash Down Babylon" (featuring The Congos) – 4:09
3. "The Party" (featuring Doreen Shaffer) – 3:41
4. "Schooling the Youth" (featuring Glen Adams with John Fx) – 5:12
5. "Matey Exterminator" (featuring Ari Up) – 6:23
6. "Running from Safety" (featuring Chris Murray) – 2:47
7. "Two-Faced Man" (features Ranking Joe with Cornell Campbell) – 4:05
8. "Grabalicious Man" (featuring The Congos) – 3:06
9. "Thinking of You" (featuring Doreen Shaffer) – 3:45
10. "I Am a Rasta Man" (featuring Chris Murray) – 2:14
11. "The Power and the Glory" (featuring The Congos) – 7:07
12. "You Turn Me On" (featuring Susan Cadogan) – 3:59 (re-release only)
13. "Since I Found You" (featuring Susan Cadogan) – 3:28 (re-release only)
