= Better Late Than Never (The Slackers album) =

Studio album by The Slackers
- Released: 1996
- Genre: Ska
- Length: 54:13
- Label: Moon Ska
- Producer: Victor Rice

The Slackers chronology
The Slackers (1993)	Better Late Than Never (1996)	Redlight (1997)

Professional ratings
Review scores
Source	Rating
AllMusic	3/5 stars

Better Late Than Never is the debut album by the ska/reggae band the Slackers. It was released in 1996 on Moon Ska Records. It was remastered and re-released with three additional tracks from the original recording sessions on March 19, 2002, through Special Potato Records.

The album was a significant departure from the 2 Tone and garage rock influences of the band's early days, instead opting for a sound akin to the traditional ska acts of 1960s Jamaica. The album was produced by the ska/reggae producer Victor Rice.

Two of the songs on the album, "Work Song" and "Our Day Will Come", were both previously recorded by Herb Alpert and the Tijuana Brass on the 1966 album S.R.O., though neither of the songs were written by Alpert.

The album was again reissued in 2009, by Asbestos Records, as a single disc that included a 7".

== Critical reception ==
The Florida Times-Union wrote: "One of the first tracks on the album, 'Run Away', starts with a familiar ska rhythm, but adds horns playing in an almost be-bop jazz style. Other tracks have a more swing-jazz sound, and still others, like 'Our Day Will Come', sound like straight reggae."

== CD tracks ==
All songs written by Vic Ruggiero, except where noted.

1. "Work Song" (Nat Adderley) – 5:11
2. "Runaway" – 3:44
3. "Pedophilia" – 4:19
4. "Sooner or Later" – 3:48
5. "Two Face" – 4:29
6. "Cuban Cigar" – 3:33
7. "You Don't Know I" – 5:00
8. "Tonight" (Dave Hillyard, Ruggiero) – 3:28
9. "Sarah" – 3:33
10. "Treat Me Good" (Hillyard, Ruggiero) – 4:23
11. "Prophet" (Hillyard) – 3:24
12. "Our Day Will Come" (featuring Doreen Shaffer) (Bob Hilliard / Mort Garson) – 3:55
13. "Contemplation" – 5:50
14. "7 and 7" (2002 re-release only) – 3:15
15. "Certain Girl" (Naomi Neville) (2002 re-release only) – 3:06
16. "Cawl Me Crazy" (2002 re-release only) – 4:38
