= Jay Nugent =

Jayson Nugent
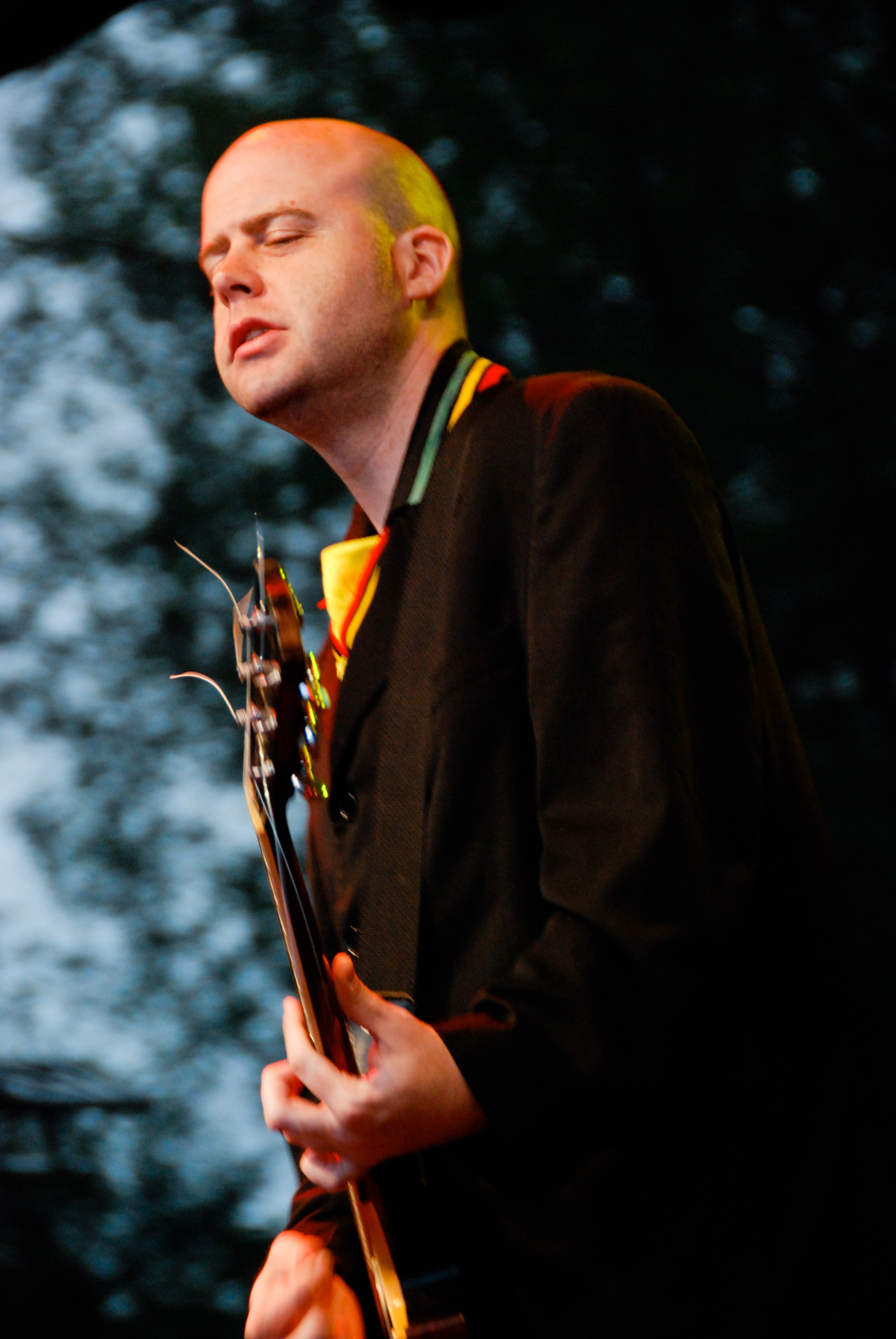

Background information
- Also known as: Agent Jay
- Born: November 20, 1972 (age 52)
- Genres: Reggae, Ska, Rocksteady
- Occupation(s): Musician, songwriter
- Instrument: Guitar

Jayson Nugent (born 1972; also known as Agent Jay, and Crazy Baldhead) is a guitarist and DJ from New York who plays in the style of several Jamaican music genres.

Nugent's experiments with ska, reggae, rocksteady, dub music, and skinhead reggae came to be noticed through his work with Version City and Stubborn Records. Since 1997, Nugent has been a staple in the New York City ska community, playing backup for King Django, trading dub masters with Victor Rice, and playing in The Slackers. Other bands that featured Nugent's guitar work in the 1990s include: Agent 99, Stubborn All-Stars, Da Whole Thing, and Version City Rockers. In 2007, Nugent released the Crazy Baldhead Has a Posse CD, which he produced over a 10-year period, with guest musicians featured in every song.

Crazy Baldhead released The Sound of '69 in the fall of 2008. This album features re-interpretations of pop hits from 1969 in the style of Jamaican music of the time - that is, the raw, funk-influenced early reggae championed by producers such as Lee "Scratch" Perry and Harry J. In December 2013 Nugent released Boots Embraces after a successful crowd-funding campaign at BigTunes. The record features fellow members of the Slackers Dave Hillyard and Vic Ruggiero, and was mixed by Victor Axelrod. Most of the songs are written by Nugent, except "Revolution.Stop," which is inspired by The Clash's "Revolution Rock." The album cover states that "Aria" is written by J.S. Bach, but the song did not make the final cut. It is however available online.

== Discography ==
- Agent 99 - Agent 99 Cassette EP/Demo (1994)
- Agent 99 - The Biggest Boy 7" (1995)
- Stubborn All-Stars - Open Season (1995)
- Stubborn All-Stars - Back With A New Batch (1997
- Stubborn Records Presents: Version City (1997)
- Agent 99 - Little Pieces: 1993-1995 (1998)
- Rocker T and Version City Rockers - Nicer By The Hour (1998)
- New York Ska-Jazz Ensemble - Get This! (1998)
- Stubborn All-Stars - Nex Music (1999)
- Victor Rice - At Version City (2000)
- Stubborn All-Stars - At Version City (2001)
- Version City - Dub Clash (2001)
- Crazy Baldhead - Long Road/California 10" (2003)
- Crazy Baldhead - Has A Posse 1997-2004 (Stubborn, 2004)
- The Slackers - Peculiar (2006)
- The Slackers - The Boss Harmony Sessions (2007)
- The Slackers - Minha Menina 7" (2007)
- The Slackers - Self Medication (2008)
- Crazy Baldhead - The Sound Of '69 (2008)
- The Slackers - Lost & Found (2009)
- The Slackers - Dreidel 7" (2009)
- The Slackers - NYC Boat Cruise 2009 (Whatevski, digital only, 2009)
- The Slackers - Slackfest NYC 2009 (Whatevski, digital only, 2009)
- The Slackers - Holiday Party With... (Whatevski, digital only, 2009)
- The Slackers - Live On the West Side 4/6/10 (Whatevski, digital only, 2010)
- The Slackers - The Great Rocksteady Swindle (2010)
- The Slackers - New Years Day 7" (Urban Pirate Records,2010)
- Crazy Baldhead - Too Much Technology 7" (Urban Pirate Records, 2010)
- Crazy Baldhead - The Reggae Will Not Be Televised (Whatevski, 2010)
- The Slackers - Live In San Francisco 12/31/10 (digital only, 2011)
- The Slackers - Stash Box (2011)
- Crazy Baldhead - Cutback 7" (Simmerdown Productions 2012)
- Crazy Baldhead - Boots Embraces (2013)
- The Upstarters - Bubble Dub (Agent Jay of The Slackers) (Remix) (2021)
