= Stubborn All-Stars =

American ska band

- Origin: New York, New York, United States
- Genres: Ska
- Years active: 1994–present
- Past members: Mikey JC

Stubborn All-Stars are an American, New York City-based ska band led by King Django, front man of Skinnerbox and owner of Stubborn Records.

In 1994, Django assembled Stubborn All-Stars for a studio session which resulted in the four-song Old's Cool 7" EP. Choosing musicians carefully from the large pool of New York ska bands such as Skinnerbox, The Insteps, The Slackers, The Scofflaws, and Agent 99, for their familiarity with and ability to play traditional Jamaican ska. Django hit upon the sound he was looking for: ska in a very traditional Jamaican style, reconnected with its own roots in American Rhythm & Blues.

They released their debut Open Season in September 1995, featuring guest appearances by Roland Alphonso of the Skatalites, Chris Dowd (ex-Fishbone), and Robert "Bucket" Hingley of the Toasters.

Their second album, Back With a New Batch, was released in 1997. AllMusic described it as "hands down, the best ska album of 1997". The video for the single Pick Yourself Up went into heavy rotation on MTV, and Alternative Press reviewed it as "the best reggae album of 1997".

Their third album, Nex Music, was released in 1999.

The band also collaborated with famous punk band Rancid on the song 'I Wanna Riot' for the Beavis and Butt-Head Do America soundtrack.

== Line up ==
- King Django (Skinnerbox) - Vocals, Trombone
- Jay Nugent (Agent 99, The Slackers) - Guitar
- Noah Shachtman (No Shadow Kick) - Bass Guitar
- Rolf Langsjoen (Skinnerbox) - Trumpet
- Phil Wartell (The Radiation Kings) - Drums
- Scott Palmer (The Radiation Kings) - Keys
- David Hahn (Dub Is a Weapon, Skinnerbox, The Slackers) - Guitar
- Dave Hillyard (The Slackers, Dave Hillyard & the Rocksteady Seven) - Sax
- Vic Ruggiero (The Slackers) - Organ
- Victor Rice (The Scofflaws, New York Ska-Jazz Ensemble) - Bass Guitar
- Eddie Ocampo (The Insteps, Dave Hillyard & the Rocksteady 7, Crazy Baldhead) - Drums
- Sheldon Gregg (The Insteps, New York Ska-Jazz Ensemble, Bluebeaters) - Bass
- Erkin Husey (Skinnerbox, The Rudie Crew) - Sax
- Danny Dulin (The Boilers, Skinnerbox, Rudie Crew) - Trumpet
- Dave Nelson (The Insteps) - Trombone
- Paul Ackerman (The Pietasters, Skinnerbox) - Keys
- Regina Bellantese (The Insteps, The Scofflaws) - Sax
- Jason Glazer (Skinnerbox) - Trumpet
- Eric Singer (The Slackers) - Sax
