= King Django =

- Birth name: Jeffrey Baker
- Origin: Brooklyn, New York City, New York
- Genres: Reggae, ska, rocksteady, dub, dancehall, rhythm & blues, soul, Klezmer
- Occupation(s): Musician, songwriter, record producer
- Years active: 1986–present
- Labels: Stubborn Records

King Django (born Jeffrey Baker) is an American bandleader, singer, songwriter, arranger, engineer, producer, and multi-instrumentalist, especially in the genres of ska, rocksteady, reggae, dub, dancehall, rhythm & blues and soul. Other influences in his music have included traditional jazz, swing, klezmer, hardcore/punk rock, hip-hop and electronica.

Django has toured many times throughout the United States, Europe, Canada, and Japan as the leader of Stubborn All-Stars, Skinnerbox, and the King Django Band and as a sideman with such renowned acts as Rancid, Murphy's Law, The Slackers, and The Toasters. He is also widely known and respected as an influential mentor to younger musicians, sharing and spreading his deep knowledge of and love for Jamaican and American music. Django currently performs regularly leading the King Django Band and Bad Luck Dice and as a sideman with Predator Dub Assassins.

== Early years ==
King Django was born at Brookdale Hospital in Brooklyn, New York and grew up in the east Brooklyn neighborhood of Canarsie. His interest in music was sparked while attending Hunter College High School in uptown Manhattan, New York. At age 15 he became a professional computer programmer in New York. Since taking up the trombone at age 19, the self-taught musician has been steadily playing, touring, and recording with a series of bands. From 1986 to 1988, he played trombone, wrote, composed, sang and co-led the seminal New York City rocksteady band The Boilers. In late 1988 Django formed Skinnerbox, melding ska, reggae, dancehall, funk, punk, jump blues, soul and psychedelia.

Baker is Jewish, and his grandfather survived the Holocaust.

== Stubborn Records ==
In 1992 he formed the Stubborn Records label to release Skinnerbox's debut full-length CD Tales of the Red. The Stubborn Records label went on to define the 1990s New York traditional ska sound and continues releasing new material to this day.

== Stubborn All-Stars ==
In 1994 he assembled a group of musicians under the name Stubborn All-Stars for a recording session which yielded the 4-song vinyl EP Old's Cool released on the Stubborn Records. Within two weeks of the release of this record, he was summoned to the offices of Profile Records in New York to sign a recording contract. In 1995 and 1996 Stubborn All-Stars had a degree of commercial success with the singles “Tin Spam” and “Pick Yourself Up,” which saw rotation on MTV.

== Version City ==
In 1997 Django assembled the Version City recording studio which rapidly became the hub of the New York ska and reggae scene. The popular Version City Party was started that same year at Coney Island High on St. Mark's Place in Manhattan's East Village. In 2000 the studio was moved to New Brunswick, New Jersey, where Django continues his engineering and production work for a wide roster of international clients. In August 2006 after several years of floating to different venues, most notably SEHO on the Lower East Side, the Version City Party was resurrected as a monthly at the Knitting Factory in New York City, on the first Saturday of every month.

== Echo Mix Wave Tour ==
In late 2011, Django was a headlining performer on the month-long “Echo Mix” tour along with Konrad Kuechenmeister (Berlin, Germany) and Brian Hill of Regatta 69. In June of the same year, Django set out alone for Florida, performing a string of shows with several different backing bands. In 2012 Django celebrated the 20th anniversary of his independent label Stubborn Records, as well as the 5th anniversary of his Version City label based in Kingston, Jamaica.

== Version City Tour ==
In late 2012 and early 2013, Django took his popular, long-standing rocksteady and ska Version City Party (active since 1997, most notably at prestigious New York venue The Knitting Factory) on the road, leading the first Version City Tour through 30 dates in 10 states. Playing piano and trombone, supported by young Pennsylvania band The Snails, Django performed a wide selection of his own material as well as a number of classic reggae and ska tunes.

In February 2013, Django was invited to perform in Kingston, Jamaica, at the Institute of Jamaica’s Jamaica Music Museum, accompanying such musical dignitaries as Mystic Revelation of Rastafari, Ras Michael, Nambo Robinson, Big Youth, Junior Reid, and Bongo Herman.

In late May and early June 2013, Django led the second outing of his Version City Tour through 27 east coast shows in 25 days. Version City Tour #2 featured a compact and versatile quartet with Django being joined by Brian Hill of North Carolina’s Regatta 69 on bass and vocals as well as guitarist/vocalist John DeCarlo of hard-touring Boston ska group Westbound Train. Depending on the venue, the show ranged from 45 minutes to three hours, showcasing the songs of these three veteran performers, along with drummer Anthony Vito Fraccalvieri of Long Island bands Broadcaster and Royal City Riot (who had just come off a six-week U.S. tour with The Toasters).

== Discography ==
=== with Skinnerbox ===
- Instrumental Conditioning cassette 1990
- Now & Then cassette 1992
- Tales of the Red CD/cassette (Stubborn), May 1993
- "Does He Love You"/"Right Side" 7" single (Stubborn) Dec. 1993
- Sunken Treasure 4-song EP (Stubborn) July 1994
- Special Wild 1989-1994 CD (Stubborn), May 1996
- What You Can Do, What You Can't (Moon Ska) Apr 1997
- Demonstration full-length CD/CS (Triple Crown Records/Stubborn) Dec 1998

Compilation appearances

- NYC SKA Live LP (Moon) 1991
- Step on a Crack (Sound Views) 1992
- Skarmageddon CD (Moon) July 1994
- Stay Sharp Vol. 2 (Step-1 - England) June 1995
- Skinnerbox, Scofflaws V/A: Joint Ventures of Ska CD (DVS Media) May 1996
- Skinnerbox, Dunia & Django, The Stable Boys, Noah & The Arks, et al. V/A: Roots, Branch & Stem CD *(Stubborn), June 1996
- This Aren't 2-Tone compilation CD (Too Hep) 1996
- Big Skank Theory (1997, Le Silence De La Rue - France)
- Skankaholics Anonymous (Moon Ska) Apr 1997
- Skinnerbox, Stubborn All-Stars V/A: Give 'Em the Boot (1997, Hellcat)
  - Track 08 - "Does He Love You?"
- Skinnerbox, The Lonely Boys V/A: Who's The Man (Full Stop) 1998
- All Around Massive (Cole Mack) 1998
- Ska, Punk & Disorderly (BANKSHOT!) 1998
- NYC Ska Mob & Friends (Grover - Germany) Dec 1998

=== with Stubborn All-Stars ===
- Old's Cool EP (1994, Stubborn)
- Open Season CD/LP (1995, Another Planet Records 6009)
- Back With a New Batch (November 1997, Triple Crown Records 3003)
- Nex Music (1999, Stubborn)

Compilation appearances

- Spawn of Skarmageddon (1995, Moon Ska Records 058)
  - Track 01 - "Tired of Struggling"
- Ed's Next Move soundtrack CD/CS (1996, Milan Records 35776)
  - Track 04 - "Look Away"
- Rancid with Stubborn All-Stars: Beavis & Butthead Do America soundtrack (1996, Geffen)
  - Track 05 - "I Wanna Riot"
- New York Beat: Breaking and Entering CD (1997, Moon Ska Records 099)
  - Track 20 - "Bald Man Jump"
- Dancin' Mood CD/LP (1997, Triple Crown Records 3002/Another Planet Records 6019)
  - Track 03 - "Dave Helm" / Track 07 - "Citadel"
- Give 'Em the Boot CD (1997, Hellcat Records 80402/Epitaph Records 04022)
  - Track 10 - "Open Season"
- Roots, Branch and Stem: Living Tradition in Ska! CD (1998, Stubborn Records 002)
  - Track 02 - "Tin Spam (Bokkle mix)"
- Somewhere in the City soundtrack CD (1998, Velvel Records 79717)
  - Track 11 - "Tim Spam"
- City Rockers: A Tribute To The Clash CD (1999, Chord Records 030)
  - Track 11 - "Lose This Skin"
- NYC Ska Mob & Friends (December 1998, Grover Records - Germany)

=== Other recordings ===
- King Django: Brooklyn Hangover (2010, Stubborn Records)
- Subatomic Sound System: On All Frequencies (featuring King Django)(Subatomic Sound/ Modus Vivendi / Nomadic Wax) 2007
- King Django: Roots Tonic (Jump Up/Stubborn/Big 8) 2005/2006
- Subatomic Sound System: Lost Hits Vol. 1: Dancehall versus Hip Hop (dancehall remixes with King Django) (Subatomic Sound) 2005
- King Django: A Single Thread (Megalith/Leech) 2004
- V/A: Version City Sessions (Asian Man) 2004
- Sonic Boom Six Through the Eyes of a Child (Rebel Alliance Recordings) 2009
- Version City Rockers: Deeper Roots (Antifaz) 2004
- King Django meets the Scrucialists (2003, Leech/Grover)
- Don Khumalo: De Vuelta al Ska (2001, Stubborn Venezuela)
- King Django: Reason (2001, Hellcat/Epitaph)
- Version City Rockers: Version City Dub Clash (2000, Stubborn/Jump Start)
- Radiation Kings Early Years (1999, Stubborn)
- King Django King Django’s Roots & Culture (1998, Triple Crown)
- The Agents For All The Massive (Radical) Oct 1998
- Rocker T & Version City Rockers Nicer By The Hour (June 1998, Stubborn/December 1998, Grover Records - Germany)
- Rocket From the Crypt
- The Usuals At Shirley & Juicy’s (1997, No Idea)
- The Toasters Hard Band for Dead (1996, Moon)
- The Slackers Better Late Than Never (1996, Moon Ska)
- CIV Set Your Goals (1995, Revelation Records/Atlantic)
- Die Monster Die 1995
- Murphy's Law Good For Now EP (1993, We Bite Records)
- Outface Outface (1993, Crisis/Revelation)
- The Boilers Rockin' Steady LP (Oi/Ska - England) 1988

Compilation appearances

- Too True: NY Beat - Hit & Run (1985, Moon)
- The Boilers: Skaface LP (1988, Moon)
- Django and Elwood: Keep the Pressure On (1996, Kingpin Records)
- Castillo y La Rabia: Latin Ska Vol. 2 (Moon) 1996
- King Django, The Demanders, Selika and Django: Version City (Stubborn) Dec 1997
- King Django: Give 'Em the Boot III (2002, Hellcat/Epitaph)
  - Track 17 - "Precipice"
- Version City Rockers: Roots of Dub Funk 3 (Tanty Records) 2003
