= The Slackers =

American ska band

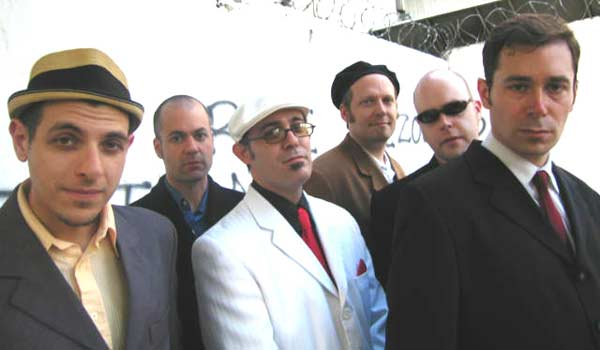
- L to R: Vic Ruggiero, Ara Babajian, Marcus Geard, Dave Hillyard, Jay Nugent, Glen Pine

Background information
- Also known as: The Nods
- Origin: Manhattan, New York City, New York, U.S.
- Genres: Ska, rocksteady, reggae
- Years active: 1991–present
- Labels: Hellcat, Moon Ska, Whatevski Records, Indication Records, Pirate’s Press Records, Special Potato Records, Paper + Plastick
- Members: Vic Ruggiero; Jay Nugent; Dave Hillyard; Glen Pine; Marcus Geard; Ara Babajian
- Past members: Marc Lyn; T.J. Scanlon; Luis Zuluaga; Jeremy Mushlin; Allen Teboul; Dunia Best; Tobias Fields; Eric "Erok" Singer; Dave Hahn; King Django
- Website: Official Site

The Slackers are an American ska band formed in Manhattan, New York, in 1991. Their music blends ska, rocksteady, reggae, dub, soul, garage rock, and jazz, drawing heavily from 1960s Jamaican music while incorporating American and British influences.

Emerging from New York City's early-1990s ska scene, the band became associated with the revival of traditional ska and rocksteady in the United States in the 1990s, distinguishing themselves from the more punk-oriented third-wave ska movement through an emphasis on roots reggae, rocksteady, and soul-based arrangements.

Over a career spanning more than three decades, the Slackers have released numerous studio albums, toured extensively across North America, Europe, South America, and Japan, and maintained a largely independent, do-it-yourself approach to recording and touring.

== Career ==
By the mid-1990s, The Slackers had become an established presence within the American ska and reggae underground. The band’s second studio album, Redlight, was released on September 23, 1997, received notable critical recognition. It was ranked number seven on Billboard editor Carrie Bell's "The Year in Music (1997)" list, and its title track charted at number 116 on the CMJ Radio Top 200 during the week of November 10, 1997, marking its third week on the chart.

Throughout the late 1990s and 2000s, The Slackers maintained a steady release schedule, accompanied by extensive touring. During this time, the band became known for long, varied live sets and a large rotating repertoire, reportedly comprising over 200 songs, including original material alongside covers adapted to their roots-oriented style.

Interviews from the era emphasize the group's reliance on live performance rather than mainstream promotion as the central driver of their career, with touring serving as both their primary source of income and their preferred creative environment. Members have also described their studio work as an extension of their live performances, with arrangements and recordings shaped by material tested and refined on tour.

The Slackers continued to release albums and tour extensively in the decades that followed, maintaining a steady output and a consistent live presence. In 2022, the band released the album Don't Let The Sunlight Fool Ya, which reached number one on the Billboard Reggae Albums chart.

== Related projects ==
Members of The Slackers have also been involved in a range of other musical projects, including Reggae Workers of the World, David Hillyard & The Rocksteady Seven, Crazy Baldhead Sound System, Da Whole Thing, The Hall Trees, Stubborn All-Stars, and the SKAndalous All Stars. Vocalist and organist Vic Ruggiero has also pursued a solo career, performing both original material and reworked Slackers songs, and has contributed keyboards and piano to several albums by Rancid.

== Members ==
=== Current lineup ===
- Vic Ruggiero – keyboards, vocals
- Jay "Agent Jay" Nugent – guitar
- Dave Hillyard – saxophone
- Glen Pine – trombone, vocals
- Marcus Geard – bass
- Ara Babajian – drums

=== Former members and contributors ===
- Marc "Q-Maxx 4:20" Lyn – vocals
- TJ Scanlon – guitar
- Luis "Zulu" Zuluaga – drums
- Jeremy "Mush One" Mushlin – trumpet, vocals
- Allen Teboul – drums
- Dunia Best- vocals, flute
- Jeff "King Django" Baker – trombone
- Tobias Fields – congas
- Eric "Erok" Singer – alto saxophone, baritone saxophone
- Dave Hahn – lead guitar
- Ben Lewis – trumpet
- Justin Redekop – trumpet

=== Former producers and collaborators ===
- Victor Rice – producer and bass
- Zack Levine – producer
- Eric Sierra – songwriter
- David Lindome – producer

== Discography ==
=== Studio albums ===
- Better Late Than Never (1996)
- Redlight (1997)
- The Question (1998)
- Wasted Days (2001)
- The Slackers and Friends (2002)
- Close My Eyes (2003)
- An Afternoon in Dub (2005)
- Slackness (with Chris Murray) (2005)
- Peculiar (2006)
- The Boss Harmony Sessions (2007)
- Self Medication (2008)
- The Great Rocksteady Swindle (2010)
- The Radio (2011)
- The Slackers (2016)
- Don’t Let The Sunlight Fool Ya (2022)

=== EPs ===
- International War Criminal (2004)
- The Slackers/Pulley Split (2004)
- My Bed Is A Boat (2013)

=== Singles ===
- "2-Face" (1996)
- "International War Criminal" (2004)
- "Pully Split" (2004)
- "You Must Be Good" (2006)
- "Little Joe" (2006)
- "Minha Menina" (2007)
- "Dreidel" (2009)
- "New Years Day" (Urban Pirate Records, 2010)
- "Xmas Every Day" (2011)
- "Crazy Baldhead" (2012)
- "Sarah" (2012)
- "My Bed Is A Boat" (2013)
- "By You With You For You" (2013)
- "Heroes b/w Always On My Mind" (2015)
- "I Can't Hide" (2016)
- "The Boss" (2016)
- "Wrongfull Suspension" (2018)
- "Peculiar" (2019)
- "The Way Of A Woman" (2019)
- "Baba Roots" (2019)
- "Sleep Outside" (2020)
- "Nobody Listening" (2020)
- "Blue" (2020)
- "Widowland" (2021)
- "Watch This" (2021)
- "人にやさしく / Wicked Must Survive" (2021)
- "Don't Let The Sunlight Fool Ya"(2022)
- "New York Berlin" (2022)
- "Kill You". (2023)

=== Demo cassettes ===
- Do the Ska with The Slackers (1992)
- The Slackers (1993)

=== Live albums ===
- Live at Ernesto's (2000)
- Upsettin' Ernesto's (2004)
- Slack in Japan (2005)
- NYC Boat Cruise 2009 (digital only, 2009)
- Slackfest NYC 2009 (digital only, 2009)
- Holiday Party With... (digital only, 2009)
- Live On the West Side 4/6/10 (digital only, 2010)
- Live In San Francisco 12/31/10 (digital only, 2011)

=== Collections ===
- Before There Were Slackers There Were... (1999)
- Big Tunes! Hits & Misses from 1996 to 2006 (2007)
- Lost and Found (2009)
- Stash Box (2011)
- Before Hellcat (2011) (USB flash drive release)
- Ganbare! (2011) (Japan only release)

=== Compilations ===
- Give 'Em the Boot
- Give 'Em the Boot II
- Give 'Em the Boot III
- Give 'Em the Boot IV
- Give 'Em the Boot V
- Give 'Em the Boot VI
- This Is Special Potatoe Vol. 1
- From New York to Luxembourg (Live @ the Kufa) (with P.O. Box, Kunn & the Magic Muffins and Toxkäpp)
- New York Beat: Breaking and Entering Volume 2

=== DVDs ===
- Give 'Em the Boot (2005): "And I Wonder"
- The Slackers: A Documentary (2007)
- The Flamingo Cantina Series with The Slackers (2009)
- The Slacker Live On Video (2014)
