= Hellcat Records =

American record label

- Parent company: Epitaph Records
- Founded: 1997
- Founder: Tim Armstrong
- Distributor: ADA
- Genre: Oi!; hardcore punk; psychobilly; punk rock; ska punk; street punk
- Country of origin: United States
- Location: Los Angeles, California
- Official website: hellcatrecords.com

Hellcat Records is an independent record label based in Los Angeles, California. The label, an offshoot of Epitaph Records, was started as a partnership between Brett Gurewitz of Bad Religion, the owner of Epitaph, and Tim Armstrong of Rancid, who was generally responsible for signing bands.

Hellcat published its Give 'Em the Boot label sampler in multiple volumes starting in 1997.

== Films ==
In 2005, a Give 'Em the Boot DVD was released, featuring tour footage of numerous Hellcat bands.

On January 15, 2006, the label released Live Freaky! Die Freaky!, a full-length film produced by Tim Armstrong and filmed using marionettes. The plot involves Charlie Manson's story being misinterpreted by a nomad on a post-apocalyptic Earth. It features the voice talents of the members of Rancid, Green Day, AFI and the Transplants.

== Notable bands ==
=== Active ===
- Tim Timebomb
- The Casualties
- Charged GBH
- Civet
- The Creepshow
- Danny Diablo
- Devil's Brigade
- Grade 2
- HorrorPops
- The Interrupters
- Left Alone
- Nekromantix
- Orange
- Rancid
- Rat Boy
- Static Thought
- The Unseen
- Westbound Train

=== Former ===
- The Aggrolites
- Choking Victim
- Dave Hillyard and the Rocksteady Seven
- The Distillers
- Dropkick Murphys
- F-Minus
- The Gadjits
- The Heart Attacks
- Hepcat
- The Independents
- Joe Strummer and the Mescaleros
- King Django
- Lars Frederiksen and the Bastards
- Leftöver Crack
- Los Difuntos
- The Luchagors
- Mercy Killers
- The Mighty Mighty Bosstones
- The Nerve Agents
- Operation Ivy (re-release only)
- The Pietasters
- Roger Miret and the Disasters
- The Slackers
- Society's Parasites
- Street Dogs
- Tiger Army
- Time Again
- Transplants
- U.S. Bombs
- U.S. Roughnecks
