= Anti-Flag discography =

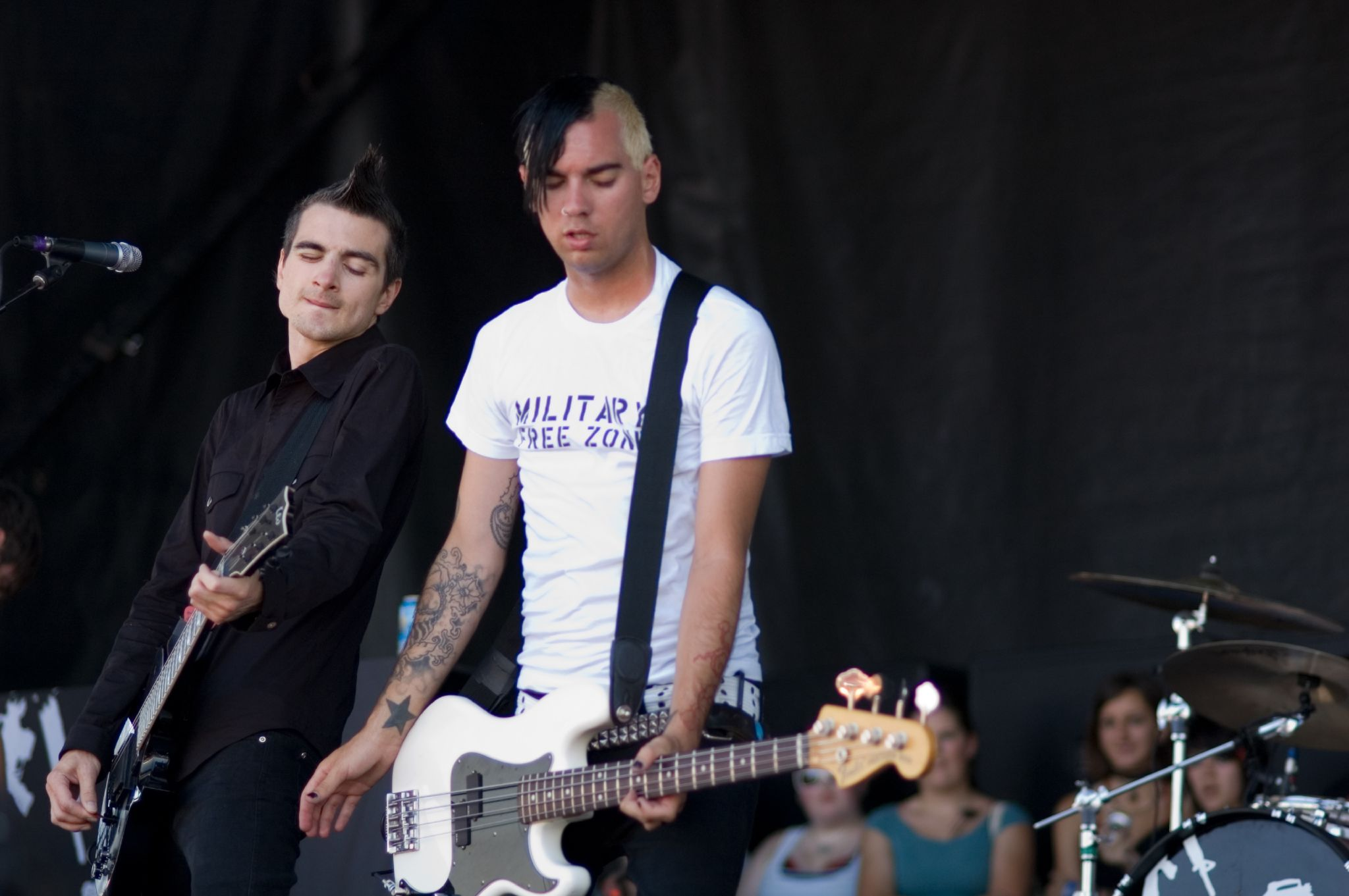
- Studio albums: 12
- Extended plays: 4
- Live albums: 1
- Compilation albums: 3
- Singles: 17
- Video albums: 1
- Music videos: 13
- Split albums: 8

The following is a list of releases by American punk rock band Anti-Flag.

== Albums ==
=== Studio albums ===
Year	Album details	Chart peak		
Year	Album details	US	US Indie	CAN
1996	Die for the Government: Released: August 20, 1996; Label: New Red Archives	—	—	—
1999	A New Kind of Army: Released: May 25, 1999; Label: Go-Kart	—	—	—
2001	Underground Network: Released: April 24, 2001; Label: Fat Wreck Chords	—	23	—
2002	Mobilize: Released: February 19, 2002; Label: A-F	—	42	—
2003	The Terror State: Released: October 21, 2003; Label: Fat Wreck Chords	91	7	—
2006	For Blood and Empire: Released: March 21, 2006; Label: RCA	100	—	69
2008	The Bright Lights of America: Released: April 1, 2008; Label: RCA	118	—	—
2009	The People or the Gun: Released: June 9, 2009; Label: SideOneDummy	122	23	—
2012	The General Strike: Released: March 20, 2012; Label: SideOneDummy	—	38	—
2015	American Spring: Released: May 26, 2015; Label: Spinefarm	—	—	—
2017	American Fall: Released: November 3, 2017; Label: Spinefarm	—	11	—
2020	20/20 Vision: Released: January 17, 2020; Label: Spinefarm	—	—	—
2023	Lies They Tell Our Children: Released: January 6, 2023; Label: Spinefarm	—	—	—
"—" denotes a release that did not chart.

=== Live albums ===
Year	Album details
2016	Live Acoustic at 11th Street Records: Released: April 16, 2016; Label: Spinefarm
2017	Live Vol. 1: Released: January 20, 2017; Label: A-F
2019	Live Vol. 2: Released: August 9, 2019; Label: A-F

=== Compilation albums ===
Year	Album details
1998	Their System Doesn't Work for You: Released: 1998; Label: A-F
2013	Archives Vol. 1: The Covers: Released: September 18, 2013; Label: A-F
2013	Archives Vol. 2: The Demos: Released: December 4, 2013; Label: A-F
2014	Archives Vol. 3: The B-Sides: Released: May 2, 2014; Label: A-F
2014	A Document of Dissent: 1993–2013: Released: June 21, 2014; Label: Fat Wreck Chords
2015	Cease Fires: Released: December 18, 2015; Label: A-F
2018	American Reckoning: Released: September 28, 2018; Label: Spinefarm

=== Split albums ===
Year	Album details
1993	Rock'n with Father Mike: Released: 1993; Label: Self-released; Split with: The Bad Genes
1996	Reject: Released: 1996; Label: A-F Records; Split with: Against All Authority
1996	God Squad / Anti-Flag: Released: 1996; Label: ???; Split with: God Squad
1996	North America Sucks!!: Released: 1996; Label: Nefer Records; Split with: d.b.s.
1997	I'd Rather Be in Japan: Released: 1997; Label: NAT; Split with: Obnoxious
1998	The Dread / Anti-Flag: Released: 1998; Label: SixWeeks; Split with: The Dread
2002	BYO Split Series Volume IV: Released: September 3, 2002; Label: BYO; Split with: The Bouncing Souls
2009	Rise Against / Anti-Flag: Released: February 17, 2009; Label: DGC; Format: 7" vinyl (limited edition); Split with: Rise Against
2013	Hostage Calm/Anti-Flag: Released: February 26, 2013; Label: Run for Cover; Format: 7" vinyl (limited edition); Split with: Hostage Calm

=== Video albums ===
Year	Album details
2004	Death of a Nation: Released: October 26, 2004; Label: A-F

== EPs ==
Year	EP details
1995	Kill Kill Kill: Released: 1995; Label: Ripe
2003	Live at Fireside Bowl: Released: July 1, 2003; Label: Liberation
2007	A Benefit for Victims of Violent Crime: Released: October 2, 2007; Label: A-F
2009	Which Side Are You On?: Released: June 9, 2009; Label: SideOneDummy
2011	Complete Control Recording Sessions: Released: September 27, 2011; Label: SideOneDummy
2013	20 Years of Hell Vol. I: Released: July 21, 2013; Label: A-F
2013	20 Years of Hell Vol. II: Released: October 3, 2013; Label: A-F
2013	20 Years of Hell Vol. III: Released: December 11, 2013; Label: A-F
2014	20 Years of Hell Vol. IV: Released: February 18, 2014; Label: A-F
2014	20 Years of Hell Vol. V: Released: June 4, 2014; Label: A-F
2014	20 Years of Hell Vol. VI: Released: July 2014; Label: A-F

== Singles ==
Year	Song	Chart peak		Album
Year	Song	US Alt.	CAN	Album
2003	"Turncoat"	—	—	The Terror State
2004	"Death of a Nation"	—	—	The Terror State
2004	"Post-War Breakout"	—	—	The Terror State
2006	"The Press Corpse"	37	—	For Blood and Empire
2006	"1 Trillion Dollar$"	—	—	For Blood and Empire
2006	"This Is the End (for You My Friend)"	—	—	For Blood and Empire
2006	"War Sucks, Let's Party"	—	—	For Blood and Empire
2006	"Emigre"	—	—	For Blood and Empire
2008	"The Bright Lights of America"	—	—	The Bright Lights of America
2008	"The Modern Rome Burning"	—	—	The Bright Lights of America
2009	"When All The Lights Go Out"	—	—	The People or the Gun
2009	"Sodom, Gomorrah, Washington D.C."	—	—	The People or the Gun
2010	"Queens and Kings"	—	—	The Second Coming Of Nothing
2012	"The Neoliberal Anthem"	—	—	The General Strike
2012	"This Is the New Sound"	—	—	The General Strike
"—" denotes a release that did not chart.

== Music videos ==
Year	Song	Director
2003	"Turncoat"	
2004	"Death of a Nation"	
2004	"Post-War Breakout"	
2006	"The Press Corpse"	
2006	"1 Trillion Dollar$"	
2006	"This Is the End (for You My Friend)"	
2006	"War Sucks, Let's Party"	
2008	"The Bright Lights of America"	
2008	"The Modern Rome Burning"	
2009	"When All the Lights Go Out"	Thom Glunt
2010	"The Economy Is Suffering...Let It Die"	
2012	"This is the New Sound"	
2013	"Broken Bones"	
2013	"Toast to Freedom [feat. Donots, Ian D'Sa & Bernd Beatsteaks]"	Dominik Balcow
2015	"Brandenburg Gate [feat. Tim Armstrong]"	
2015	"All Of The Poison, All Of The Pain"	Maxim Frolov
2016	"Without End (Remix) [feat. P.O.S, Tom Morello]"	Doug Helmick
2017	"American Attraction"	
2017	"When the Wall Falls"	
2017	"Liar"	
2017	"Digital Blackout"	
2018	"Finish What We Started"	
2018	"Trouble Follows Me"	
2018	"The Debate Is Over" (acoustic version)	
2018	"American Attraction" (acoustic)	
2018	"For What It's Worth"	
2019	"Hate Conquers All"	

== Other appearances ==
The following Anti-Flag songs were released on compilation albums. This is not an exhaustive list; songs that were first released on the band's albums, EPs, or singles are not included.

Year	Song	Album
1994	"Red Neck" "I'm Feeling Slightly Violent" "A Song for Jesus Christ"	Iron City Punk
1998	"Out Break" "Rock the Boat" "Punk and Drunk"	This Is East Coast Punk
1999	"Bring it to an End"	Short Music for Short People
1999	"What About the Lonely"	Punk Rock Jukebox II
1999	"Apathy Strikes Out"	Go-Kart vs. the Corporate Giant 2
1999	"I'm Gonna See You" "Equality Song"	A-F Records Sampler No 1
2000	"New Kind of Army" (live)	World Warped III Live
2000	"Someone's Gonna Die Tonight"	Terror Firmer Soundtrack
2001	"Seattle Was a Riot"	Fat Music Volume V: Live Fat, Die Young
2001	"Zapatista, Don't Give Up"	Warped Tour 2001 Tour Compilation
2001	"Drunk on Punk"	Iron City Punk 3
2002	"Federation"	Fat Music Vi: Uncontrollable Fatulence
2003	"Youth & Tear Gas"	A-F Records: Fueling the Flames of Revolution-Vol. 3
2004	"The School Of Assassins"	Rock Against Bush, Vol. 1
2005	"Feminism Is For Everybody (With A Beating Heart And A Functioning Brain)"	Protect: A Benefit for the National Association to Protect Children
2007	"Welcome to 1984"	Punk Goes Acoustic 2
2007	"911 For Peace"	Power To The Peaceful Festival 2005
2009	"1000 Miles"	Let Them Know: The Story of Youth Brigade and BYO Records
2009	"Underground Network" (demo)	Wrecktrospective
2013	"Toaster in the Bathtub"	The Songs of Tony Sly: A Tribute
2014	"Broken Bones" (live)	A-F Records & Commonwealth Press 2014 Free Sampler
2015	"Maxwell Murder"	Hooligans United: A Tribute to Rancid
