= Cease Fires =

Compilation album by Anti-Flag
- Released: December 18, 2015
- Recorded: 2013–2015
- Genre: Punk rock
- Length: 37:34
- Label: A-F

Anti-Flag chronology
American Spring (2015)	Cease Fires (2015)	Live Acoustic at Eleventh Street Records (2016)

Cease Fires is a compilation album by punk rock band Anti-Flag. It contains twelve songs previously released on their 20 Years of Hell EPs and two previously unreleased outtakes from their latest studio album American Spring.

Anti-Flag originally didn't plan to re-release the twelve songs from their 20 Years of Hell EP series. But in the end they changed their mind, because of the importance of the songs and the exclusiveness of the EPs, hoping they wouldn't anger the EP buyers.

== Track listing ==
No.	Title	Original Release	Length
1.	"Coward in My Veins"	previously unreleased American Spring (2015) Outtake	02:40
2.	"The New Jim Crow"	previously unreleased American Spring (2015) Outtake	03:22
3.	"Kill the Rich" (Re-Recorded. Originally recorded for Kill Kill Kill)	20 Years of Hell, Vol. I (2013)	02:59
4.	"Twenty Years of Hell" (Re-Recorded. Originally recorded for Their System Doesn't Work for You)	20 Years of Hell, Vol. I (2013)	02:40
5.	"The Consumer's Song" (Re-Recorded. Originally recorded for A New Kind of Army)	20 Years of Hell, Vol. II (2013)	02:17
6.	"Bring Out Your Dead" (Re-Recorded. Originally recorded for Underground Network)	20 Years of Hell, Vol. II (2013)	02:11
7.	"Mumia's Song" (Re-Recorded. Originally recorded for Mobilize)	20 Years of Hell, Vol. III (2013)	01:44
8.	"Wake Up" (Re-Recorded. Originally recorded for The Terror State)	20 Years of Hell, Vol. III (2013)	02:28
9.	"The W.T.O. Kills Farmers" (Re-Recorded. Originally recorded for For Blood and Empire)	20 Years of Hell, Vol. IV (2014)	03:29
10.	"No Future" (Re-Recorded. Originally recorded for A Benefit for Victims of Violent Crime)	20 Years of Hell, Vol. IV (2014)	02:40
11.	"The Ink and the Quill (Be Afraid)" (Re-Recorded. Originally recorded for The Bright Lights of America)	20 Years of Hell, Vol. V (2014)	03:22
12.	"The Gre(A)t Depression" (Re-Recorded. Originally recorded for The People or the Gun)	20 Years of Hell, Vol. V (2014)	02:40
13.	"The Ghosts of Alexandria" (Re-Recorded. Originally recorded for The General Strike)	20 Years of Hell, Vol. VI (2014)	02:27
14.	"Close My Eyes"	20 Years of Hell, Vol. VI (2014)	02:35
Total length:			37:34
