= A Document of Dissent: 1993–2013 =

Compilation album by Anti-Flag
- Released: July 21, 2014
- Recorded: 1996–2012
- Genre: Melodic hardcore, hardcore punk, punk rock
- Label: Fat Wreck Chords
- Producer: Anti-Flag

Anti-Flag chronology
20 Years of Hell (2013/2014)	A Document of Dissent: 1993–2013 (2014)	American Spring (2015)

Professional ratings
Review scores
Source	Rating
AllMusic	3.5/5 stars

A Document of Dissent: 1993–2013 is a compilation album by the punk band Anti-Flag. The album was released on July 21, 2014, on Fat Wreck Chords. It marked the band's first release on the label since The Terror State, in 2003.

The album contains 26 tracks recorded and released by the band between 1996 and 2012, each newly remastered by Mass Giorgini.

== Track listing ==
All music is composed by Anti-Flag.

A Document of Dissent: 1993–2013 track listing
No.	Title	Album	Length
1.	"Die For the Government"	Die For The Government (1996)	3:33
2.	"Fuck Police Brutality"	Die For the Government (1996)	2:22
3.	"Tearing Everyone Down"	A New Kind Of Army (1999)	2:57
4.	"A New Kind of Army"	A New Kind of Army (1999)	3:41
5.	"That's Youth"	A New Kind of Army (1999)	3:16
6.	"Angry, Young and Poor"	Underground Network (2001)	2:42
7.	"This Machine Kills Fascists"	Underground Network (2001)	1:38
8.	"Underground Network"	Underground Network (2001)	4:03
9.	"Spaz's House Destruction Party"	Underground Network (2001)	3:04
10.	"911 for Peace"	Mobilize (2002)	3:46
11.	"Turncoat"	The Terror State (2003)	2:10
12.	"Rank N File"	The Terror State (2003)	3:46
13.	"Power to the Peaceful"	The Terror State (2003)	2:57
14.	"Death of a Nation"	The Terror State (2003)	1:55
15.	"You Can Kill the Protester, But You Can't Kill the Protest"	The Terror State (2003)	2:33
16.	"The Press Corpse"	For Blood And Empire (2006)	3:21
17.	"Hymn for the Dead"	For Blood and Empire (2006)	3:39
18.	"1 Trillion Dollar$"	For Blood and Empire (2006)	2:30
19.	"This Is the End"	For Blood and Empire (2006)	3:11
20.	"Cities Burn"	For Blood and Empire (2006)	3:03
21.	"Good and Ready"	The Bright Lights of America (2008)	3:59
22.	"The Bright Lights of America"	The Bright Lights of America (2008)	3:32
23.	"Sodom, Gomorrah, Washington D.C. (Sheep In Shepherd's Clothing)"	The People or the Gun (2009)	2:50
24.	"The Economy Is Suffering... Let It Die"	The People or the Gun (2009)	3:36
25.	"This Is the New Sound"	The General Strike (2012)	2:46
26.	"Broken Bones"	The General Strike (2012)	3:01

== Personnel ==
Anti-Flag

- Justin Sane – guitar, vocals
- Pat Thetic – drums
- Chris Head – guitar, vocals (tracks 3–26)
- Chris #2 – bass, vocals (tracks 3–26)
- Andy Flag – bass, vocals (tracks 1–2)
