= 20 Years of Hell =

- The subscribers edition cover

EP by Anti-Flag
- Released: 2013-2014
- Genre: Punk rock
- Length: 66:38
- Label: A-F

Anti-Flag chronology
The General Strike (2012)	20 Years of Hell (2013/2014)	A Document of Dissent: 1993-2013 (2014)

20 Years of Hell is a series of EPs released by Anti-Flag. In honor of the band's 20th anniversary, they released the EPs via a subscription service. Each EP, which was released digitally and as a 7", is a split, featuring two songs by Anti-Flag, both of which are re-recordings of previous Anti-Flag songs, with the exception of the last EP which features one re-recording and one new song, and two songs by a new band.

== Track listings ==
=== Vol. I ===
The first volume was released on July 21, 2013.

Vol. 1 track listing
No.	Title	Artist	Length
1.	"Kill the Rich" (Originally recorded for Die for the Government)	Anti-Flag	3:02
2.	"Twenty Years of Hell" (Originally recorded for Their System Doesn't Work for You)	Anti-Flag	2:41
3.	"Robocop"	World's Scariest Police Chases	1:32
4.	"You're Only Punk Once"	World's Scariest Police Chases	1:36

=== Vol. II ===
The second volume was released on October 3, 2013.

Vol. II track listing
No.	Title	Artist	Length
1.	"Consumer Song" (Originally recorded for A New Kind of Army)	Anti-Flag	2:18
2.	"Bring Out Your Dead" (Originally recorded for Underground Network)	Anti-Flag	2:12
3.	"What About Elvis"	All Dinosaurs	3:13
4.	"Tightrope"	All Dinosaurs	3:34

=== Vol. III ===
The third volume was released on July 21, 2013.

Vol. III track listing
No.	Title	Artist	Length
1.	"Wake Up" (Originally recorded for The Terror State)	Anti-Flag	2:28
2.	"Mumia's Song" (Originally recorded for Mobilize)	Anti-Flag	1:43
3.	"I, Human"	Worship This!	2:35
4.	"Red Herring"	Worship This!	4:19

=== Vol. IV ===
The fourth volume was released on February 18, 2014.

Vol. IV track listing
No.	Title	Artist	Length
1.	"The WTO Kills Farmers" (Originally recorded for For Blood and Empire)	Anti-Flag	3:32
2.	"No Future" (Originally recorded for A Benefit for Victims of Violent Crime)	Anti-Flag	2:38
3.	"Handouts"	One if by Land	3:01
4.	"With Integrity"	One if by Land	4:07

=== Vol. V ===
The fifth volume was released on June 4, 2014.

Vol. V track listing
No.	Title	Artist	Length
1.	"Ink and Quill" (Originally recorded for The Bright Lights of America)	Anti-Flag	3:21
2.	"The Depression" (Originally recorded for The People or the Gun)	Anti-Flag	2:38
3.	"2000 Rats"	Excluded	2:10
4.	"Abajo y a la Izquierda"	Excluded	3:00

=== Vol. VI ===
The sixth and final volume was released in July 2014

Vol. VI track listing
No.	Title	Artist	Length
1.	"Close My Eyes" (Exclusive)	Anti-Flag	2:35
2.	"The Ghosts of Alexandria" (Originally recorded for The General Strike)	Anti-Flag	2:27
3.	"Soundtrack"	Antillectual	4:13
4.	"Mother Inferior"	Antillectual	1:43
