= American proletarian poetry movement =

Political poetry movement in the US–1920s and 1930s

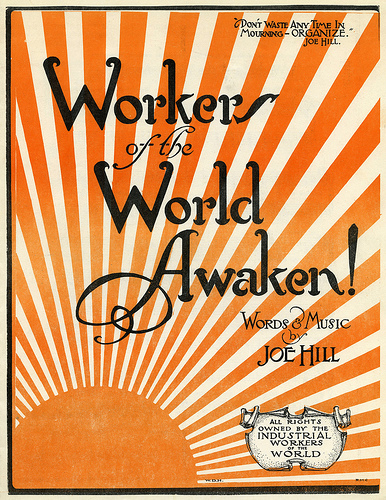
"The cover to the IWW song sheet version of Joe Hill's "Workers of the World Awaken" (1918). The quotation in the upper-right corner of the illustration comes from a telegram that Hill sent to IWW leader Bill Haywood just before Hill was executed in 1915."

Proletarian poetry is a political poetry movement that developed in the United States during the 1920s and 1930s that expresses the class-conscious perspectives of the working-class. Such poems are either explicitly Marxist or at least socialist, though they are often aesthetically disparate. As a literature that emphasized working-class voices, the poetic form of works range from those emulating African-American slave work songs to modernist poetry. Major poets of the movement include Langston Hughes, Kenneth Fearing, Edwin Rolfe, Horace Gregory, and Mike Gold.

== Background ==
While mainly originating in the proletarian literary movement that arose out of the avantgardist post-revolutionary era of the Soviet Union, proletarian poetry also had many antecedents in the United States before it rose to prominence in the 1920s. Coal miners in Pennsylvania wrote and sang militant labor songs, a form the Industrial Workers of the World embraced throughout the years before World War I. Elements of proletarian literature and poetry could also be seen in the works of William Carlos Williams, Upton Sinclair, and Jack London. During the 1910s, the reporter and poet John Reed, along with other professional writers and leftists in the labor movement, also assisted in strikes and formed plans for workers' theaters.

In 1926, the leftist magazine The New Masses was established and quickly took the forefront in defining and promoting proletarian poetry. Members of their staff went on in 1929 to organize John Reed Clubs in numerous cities around the country. Marxist in their ideology, although not officially affiliated with the Communist Party, these clubs sought to develop the writing skills of white and blue-collar workers to publish proletarian poetry and literature. Other American communist organs publishing proletarian poetry and literature during the 1920s and 30s included Max Eastman's magazine The Liberator, the Communist Party newspaper The Daily Worker,The Anvil edited by Jack Conroy, Blast, and Partisan Review.

Limited career opportunities of the 1930s during the Great Depression also contributed in bringing the movement to the forefront of American life. The disenfranchisement and unemployment caused by the economic depression was an influential inspiration for working class artists because it directly exhibited the grievances experienced by many working-class people, and revealed imbalances within the U.S. economy despite the financial success and richness of the 1920s. This realization of the imbalances of capitalism allowed for the growth of new leftist political and social discourses. Artists such as Langston Hughes, Edwin Rolfe, and Kenneth Fearing, in attempts to find solutions to the Great Depression, looked to socialism, communism, and anarchism, which resulted in these themes and ideas appearing in their literature and poetry. According to literary scholar Cary Nelson, "[d]espite considerable suffering, the mid-1930s were thus a heady time on the Left. Much of the poetry of the period combines sharp social critique with a sense of revolutionary expectation. More than simply reflecting the times, however, the "proletarian" poetry of revolution sought to define a new politics, to suggest subject positions within it, and to help bring about the changes it evoked."

== Major works ==
Kenneth Fearing's 'Dirge' is a mock-elegy printed in the working class magazine New Masses. According to critic Nathaniel Mills, Fearing examines the pitfalls of capitalism, describing a well-off executive committing suicide after financial failure. Fearing's proletarian style of "sensory shock" also allows readers to critically examine capitalism and its shortcomings.

== Description ==
Many of the poets from the genre have recently surged in popularity as they are "rediscovered" after being suppressed during the McCarthy era. Even the term of proletarian poetry and which poets or poems belong to the genre has been subject to much debate in literary criticism then and now. However, the critic Milton Cohen collated a synthesis of aesthetic, stylistic, and political concerns from numerous articles debating the issue during the 30s: The "would-be proletarian writer" should:

1. View human conflict from a social perspective (as opposed to personal, psychological, or universal) and see society in terms of economic classes.
2. Portray these classes in conflict (as Marx described them): workers versus bosses, sharecroppers versus landowners, tenants versus landlords, have-nots versus haves.
3. Develop a "working-class consciousness," that is, identify with the oppressed class in these conflicts, rather than maintaining objective detachment.
4. Present a hopeful outcome to encourage working-class readers. Other outcomes are defeatist, pessimistic, or "confused."
5. Write simply and straightforwardly, without the aesthetic complexities of formalism.
6. Above all, politicize the reader. Revolutionary literature is a weapon in the class struggle and should consciously incite its readers if not to direct action then to a new attitude toward life, "to recognize his role in the class struggle."

— Cohen 2010, p. 24

== Critical reception ==
At the time, proletarian poetry was also criticized in the 1930s by some critics for being "raucous", "stilted", and "over-sentimental", despite its attempts at representing the working class in the literature world. Many poems and songs were published in specific labor movement's magazines, like the Wobblies' Can Opener, Industrial Worker, and so on. Because of its shift from traditional verse and means of publication, proletarian poetry was not readily accepted, and it was received vaguely. Some saw proletarian poetry as not representative of the working class, that instead the white-collars were the writers because of their money and education, and not laborers themselves.

== Legacy ==
The populist proletariat movement of the 1930s has had a lasting effect on artists and voices to this day. Proletarian literature continues to be published, most notably by "Partisan Press" via the Blue Collar Review. Icons of the 1960s and 1970s progressive movements like Bob Dylan, Bruce Springsteen, and John Lennon all carried on the message of the masses through a new form of poetry and expression in rock music and pop music, which was just beginning to sprout into popular culture. Songs about the state of culture and the world like Springsteen's "Born in the U.S.A." expressed both the hardship of the times and the herculean effort it would take to make a change in the life of the working man. In fact, both Dylan and Springsteen would make tributes to Woody Guthrie's influence on their lives and musical careers, with Dylan once saying of Guthrie, "He’s the greatest holiest godliest one in the world. Genius genius genius genius", and Springsteen, "If Woody Guthrie were alive today, he'd have a lot to write about...high times on Wall Street and hard times on main street."

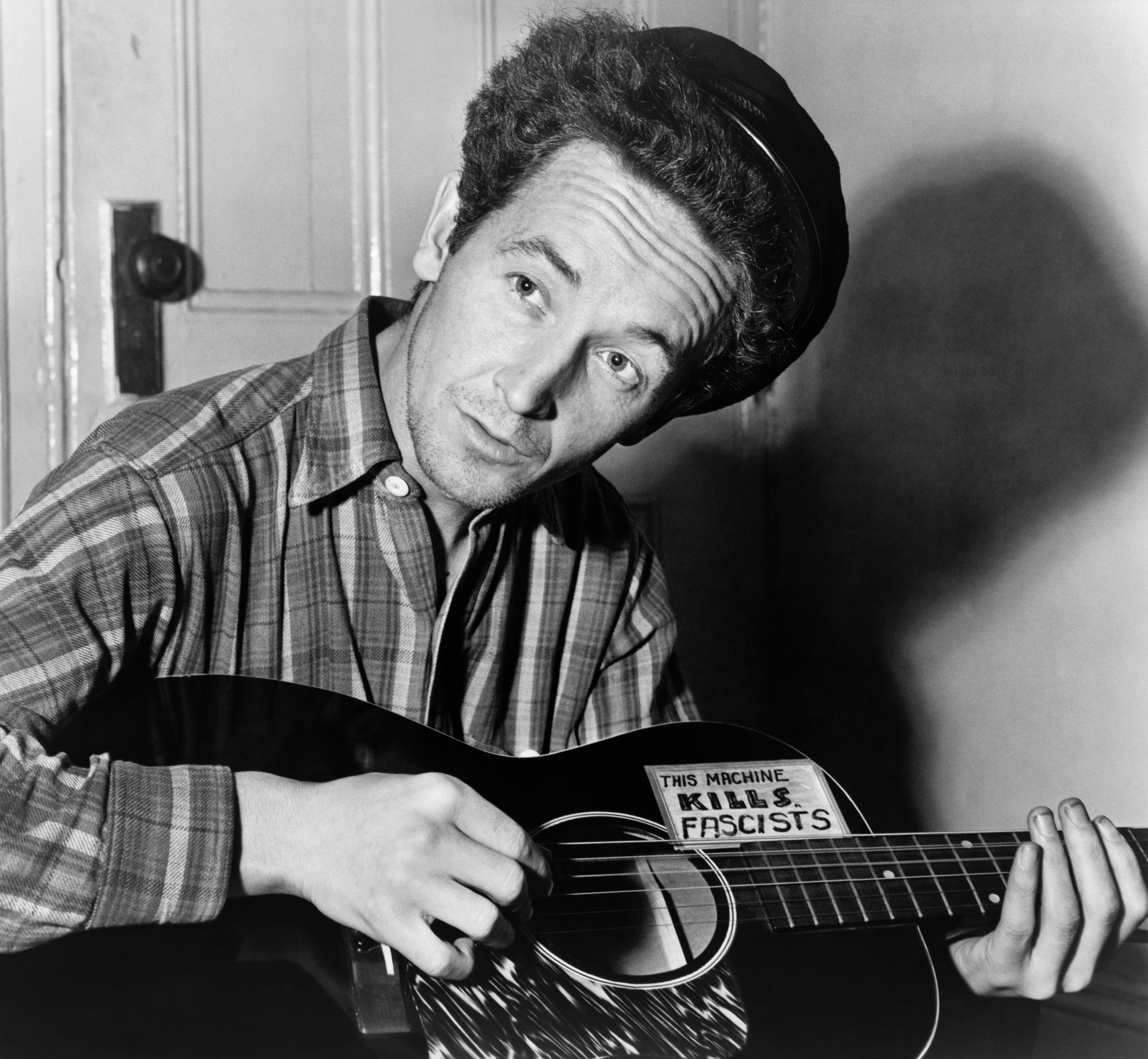
Woody Guthrie

Musicians like Woody Guthrie became the voice of the proletariat movement after the 1930s. Guthrie's "This Land Is Your Land" was written in response to what he thought was an unrealistic and complacent view of American culture in "God Bless America", and the song is considered one of the great American folk music songs. Springsteen would use the song repeatedly in his set lists throughout the years, calling it "about the most beautiful song ever written, and the greatest song ever written about America."

The punk rock movement can also trace its roots back to the messaging of the proletariat, with bands like The Sex Pistols, The Clash, and Dead Kennedys planting the seeds of anti-establishment and disillusionment thought in many youths of the time, which like Guthrie's generation, felt they had no opportunity in the world through nihilistic worldviews. The band Anti-Flag would name one of their songs on their 2001 release Underground Network "This Machine Kills Fascists" in tribute to Guthrie's guitar, on which, he had written "This machine kills fascists." The band would also put music to Guthrie's lyrics "Post-War Breakout" on their 2003 release The Terror State. Joe Strummer, one of the guitarists and the main vocalist in The Clash, once called himself "Woody" in tribute Woody Guthrie to whom he considered his hero.

The proletariat message would also find itself in the songs of Bad Religion and Nine Inch Nails, which sought to counter-act the moral majority and conservative movements taking root in American politics at the time, with Greg Graffin, the vocalist of Bad Religion, stating, "When we hit on Bad Religion, it seemed perfect...religion was a hot topic, and those TV preachers seemed like a good target to us...", and even fuel the fire of Rage Against the Machine's quest for economic equality in the 1990s, with Rage Against the Machine guitarist Tom Morello once stating, "America touts itself as the land of the free, but the number one freedom that you and I have is the freedom to enter into a subservient role in the workplace."

More modern takes on a changing world through the voices of the proletariat and middle classes can be found in Flogging Molly's and Dropkick Murphys' post-2000 releases which take on the war they say is being waged on the working man in America. Dropkick Murphys have recorded many covers of Guthrie songs included their 2005 release of I'm Shipping Up to Boston saying of the song, "Obviously, there were a lot of deep songs about World War II and labor stuff, but randomly in the middle of all these serious lyrics was this silly song, which seemed kind of cool. When other people do Woody's stuff, you normally don't see that lighthearted side of his work." The band also has recorded a cover of Guthrie's "Gonna Be A Blackout Tonight."

Since August 2011, the U.S. poet laureate, Philip Levine, is also part of this legacy. His poetry often focuses on labor in Detroit.
