= Death of a Nation =

Death of a Nation may refer to:

- Death of a Nation (2018 film), subtitled Can We Save America a Second Time?, a political documentary film by Dinesh D'Souza
- Death of a Nation (video album), a 2004 video album by the American punk band Anti-Flag
- Death of a Nation (1994 film), subtitled The Timor Conspiracy, a documentary about the role of the US and Great Britain governments in the East Timor genocide in the context of the 1990–1991 Gulf War
