= Killing of Jonny Gammage =

1995 killing by police in the Pittsburgh area

- Date: October 12, 1995
- Time: Around 2 am
- Location: Pittsburgh, Pennsylvania, US
- Deaths: Jonny Gammage

On October 12, 1995, African-American businessman Jonny Gammage was killed by police officers from several departments around Pittsburgh.

== Background ==
Gammage in 1990

Jon E. Gammage was born on July 20, 1964, in Syracuse, New York, to Johnny L. and Narves Gammage. He was the cousin of Ray Seals, an NFL football player for the Pittsburgh Steelers. Gammage graduated from the University at Buffalo in 1987. He was Seals's business partner and adviser, helping him manage his entrepreneurial and philanthropic ventures.

== Death ==
On October 12, 1995, Gammage was driving a dark blue 1988 Jaguar XJ6 towards his apartment in Moon Township, Pennsylvania. The car he was driving belonged to Seals, who was not present. Around 2 a.m. Lieutenant Milton Mulholland of the Brentwood Police Department pulled Gammage over just within the Pittsburgh city limits along State Route 51 near Frank and Shirley's Diner, at 2209 Saw Mill Run Blvd.

Four more police officers from several police departments were at the scene when a struggle ensued and, after seven minutes, Gammage died. His last words were "Keith, Keith, I'm 31. I'm only 31."

He was officially declared dead at 3:51 am at Mercy Hospital in Pittsburgh. Besides the officers involved, the only other witness to the killing was a tow-truck driver.

== Autopsy ==
A coroner's report by the Allegheny County medical examiner stated that his cause of death was homicide by asphyxiation due to pressure applied to the chest and neck. Cyril Wecht, a pathologist who performed an independent autopsy, told CBS This Morning that,

[There was] no evidence of a heart attack or any other natural disease process. He died as a result of asphyxiating due to compression of the lower neck and upper chest area ... through the application of some instrumentality. Considering that these were police officers involved, then the best bet obviously would be a night-stick, a truncheon of some kind that would have been pressed down somewhat parallel to the ground, perpendicular to the transverse lie of the chest with a significant amount of pressure applied over a sustained period of time.

== Trials ==
On November 3, 1995, a coroner's jury after a three-day open inquest recommended that homicide charges be brought against all five officers. According to the foreman of the coroner's jury, 10 to 15 officers testified that Officer John Vojtas had said "The son of a bitch bit me. I hope he dies." Allegheny County district attorney Bob Colville filed charges of involuntary manslaughter against Mullholland, Michael Albert of the Baldwin Police Department, and John Vojtas of the Brentwood Police Department. One of the officers, Keith Henderson became a witness for the prosecution in the subsequent trials.

=== Mulholland and Albert ===
The first trial of Mulholland and Albert ended in mistrial after Allegheny County Medical Examiner Cyril Wecht made what were ruled to be prejudicial statements during his testimony. The judge assigned to the case, David R. Cashman, ruled that the case could not be retried. This ruling was overturned by the state Supreme Court, Cashman was removed from the case, and Mullholland and Albert were re-tried. The second trial was again deemed a mistrial when the jury deadlocked, 11–1, with the lone vote for conviction coming from the one black jury member. Following this second mistrial, Mullholland and Albert's attorneys successfully argued that a third trial would constitute double jeopardy for their clients, and charges against the men were dropped.

=== Vojtas ===
Officer Vojtas was tried separately before an all-white jury. The jury deliberated for two days. On November 14, 1996, Vojtas was acquitted. Outside the courthouse, black protesters yelled, "Murderer!", and chanted, "No justice, no peace!" Pittsburgh Mayor Tom Murphy, who is white, appealed for calm and criticized the verdict. "I don't think that this is Pittsburgh's finest day. I think justice could have been done better."

Six months after his trial, Vojtas was promoted to sergeant. In 1999, he was placed on administrative duty after he was sued by the family of his deceased fiancée, Judith Barrett, who died by suicide in 1993 from a bullet fired from his service weapon. Before the Allegheny County Police arrived at the scene, evidence had been removed by the Brentwood Police and parts of the suicide case file went missing. The jury in the wrongful death civil trial ordered Vojtas to pay the family $215,000 which an insurance company for the Brentwood Police settled for $125,000. Vojtas returned to active duty in December 2003. By September 2019, Votjas had retired.

== Aftermath ==
Despite community pressure in both Pittsburgh and Syracuse, on Feb 19, 1999, the U.S. Department of Justice declined to bring a civil rights action against the officers and police departments involved.

== Mentions in media ==
The incident forms part of the basis of the song "Police Story" on the Anti-Flag album, A New Kind of Army.

The incident is also mentioned by rapper Sun Rise Above on the song "Triple 7 Special".

The Gammage Project, a play by Attilio Favorini, centers around the events of the murder and the trial.

In the This Is Us season 5 premiere, Randall tells Malik about Gammage's death and how tough it was to cope with it on his own.

== See also ==
- Police brutality
- List of unarmed African Americans killed by law enforcement officers in the United States
- List of killings by law enforcement officers in the United States
- Driving while black

== Sources ==
- Wecht, Cyril H.; Curriden, Mark (2005). "The Case of Jonny Gammage: Death in Police Custody". Tales from the Morgue: Forensic Answers to Nine Famous Cases Including the Scott Peterson and Chandra Levy Cases. Prometheus Books. ISBN 978-1-61592-196-6.
