= Their System Doesn't Work for You =

Their System Doesn't Work For You

Compilation album by Anti-Flag
- Released: 1998
- Recorded: 1994–1996
- Genre: Punk rock
- Length: 57:30
- Label: A-F
- Producer: Joe West, Andy Flag, and Anti-Flag

Anti-Flag chronology
North America Sucks!! (1996)	Their System Doesn't Work For You (1998)	A New Kind of Army (1999)

Professional ratings
Review scores
Source	Rating
AllMusic	2.5/5 stars

Their System Doesn't Work for You is a compilation album by punk band Anti-Flag, released in 1998. It was the first album released by the band's label A-F Records.

== Background ==
It is a reprint of the nine Anti-Flag songs available on their split album North America Sucks, plus 10 unreleased tracks. The first 10 songs were recorded during the Die for the Government sessions in the spring of 1996. Only 1000 copies of the split were released originally, and the band was unable to press anymore. As a result, they decided to rerelease the songs themselves due to the overwhelming requests from fans. As an added bonus for the fans, they decided to include rare songs from the band's first shows at WRUW in Cleveland, OH in 1994 and 1995. These are the last songs to feature Andy Flag on vocals and bass, as he left after the release of the split. By the time the album was released, the band had grown to include Chris Head on guitar and Jamie "Cock" Towns on bass.

== Song info ==
"I Can't Stand Being with You" attacks the narrator's former friend who has betrayed their ideals and values to become "a pop culture whore". The song was influenced by a quote from Jello Biofra, "You became the one you set out to destroy". The title track is a politically charged track in vein with the band's other works, attacking the people who blindly follow the government and media's rules and advice without being their own person. "We've Got His Gun" is an anti-gun track written by Andy about a friend who accidentally killed himself with his father's gun. "Born to Die" describes young kids struggling in bad circumstances. It was apparently seen by some right-wing fans as endorsing suicide, which led Justin to include a note in the album booklet disputing that view and explaining "This song is a statement about the pressures of society...which push many youth to the point of hopelessness."

"The Truth" attacks the media for their role in the Persian Gulf War, while You'll Scream Tonight additionally attacks the sexism and propaganda on television. The song is one of the more unique songs in Anti-Flag's catalog, being much slower and darker than their other songs during this time. Indie Sux is a joke track that mocks the stereotypes in the Indie, Hardline, and Emo communities. Justin wrote a note explaining that the song "was written in good fun". He went on to explain that the lines about hardline punks were the only serious part of the song, as he did not support the "jock-like" attitudes they had towards people who didn't support them.

"Anti-Violent" is about artists who mutilate themselves, use steroids, and hit on young girls. The song "20 Years of Hell" was an unreleased track recorded during the same sessions as the other songs. Justin described the song as being about his friends going through rough times and struggling. I'm Having a Good Day is another joke track.

Many of the remaining songs were included in two of the band's demos released in 1994 and 1995. "I Don't Want to Be Like You" is a live version of the same song featured on the band's first split, Rockin With Father Mike. "Betty Sue Is Dead" was also featured on their first demo, and describes a woman who was killed in 1953 because she was bisexual. A studio version of "I'm Feeling Slightly Violent" was released on the compilation album, Iron City Punk.

== Release ==
Instead of releasing the album on another label, the band decided to form their own record label to release it, A-F Records. The band would go on to use the label as an opportunity to showcase different Pittsburgh punk bands. The band would also use it to release their next album, A New Kind of Army and various subsequent releases.

== Track listing ==
No.	Title	Length
1.	"I Can't Stand Being With You"	2:08
2.	"Their System Doesn't Work for You"	2:34
3.	"We've Got His Gun"	2:17
4.	"Born To Die"	2:08
5.	"The Truth"	2:43
6.	"You'll Scream Tonight"	5:18
7.	"Indie Sux, Hardline Sux, Emo Sux, You Suck!"	2:08
8.	"Anti-violent"	3:04
9.	"20 Years of Hell"	2:34
10.	"I'm Having a Good Day"	2:43
11.	"I Don't Want To Be Like You"	3:32
12.	"Too Late"	2:50
13.	"I Don't Need Anybody"	3:51
14.	"Betty Sue Is Dead"	3:16
15.	"If Not for You"	3:18
16.	"Meet Your Master"	3:59
17.	"We Won't Take No"	2:36
18.	"Save Me"	3:02
19.	"I'm Feeling Slightly Violent"	3:29

- Tracks 1–9 recorded spring 1996, released on North America Sucks split album with d.b.s.
- Track 10 recorded for North America Sucks, previously unreleased
- Tracks 11–19 recorded 1994–1995 live at WRUW, previously unreleased

== Personnel ==
- Justin Sane - guitar, lead vocals on tracks 1, 2, 4, 5, 6, 7, 9, 10, 11, 13, 15, 18, 19
- Andy Flag - bass guitar, lead vocals on tracks 3, 8, 12, 14, 16, 17, production and mixing on tracks 1, 2, 4, 5, 7, 8 and 10
- Pat Thetic - drums
- Joe West and Anti-Flag - engineering and production
- Mass Giorgini- remastering on 2018 version

== Additional Notes/Legacy ==
- A live version of Their System Doesn't Work For You was included on the album Mobilize.
- The same track and Born to Die were also included in the live album Live Vol. 1.
- One song from the North America Sucks!! split wasn't included in the album, the bonus track Not Gonna Change. The song is available on the internet.
- A remastered version of the album was released on vinyl for the first time in 2018. The album included new artwork by band member Chris Head.
- The Truth! and Anti-Violent were released on Reject, a split album they released with Against All Authority. The album also included a re-recorded version of Your Daddy Was a Rich Man from Die For The Government.
- The title track was released on a split with Japanese punk band Obnoxious called I'd Rather Be In Japan, along with an unreleased song Class Plague. The split was only released in Japan, although the songs are now available on the internet.
