= Justin Sane =

Irish-American musician

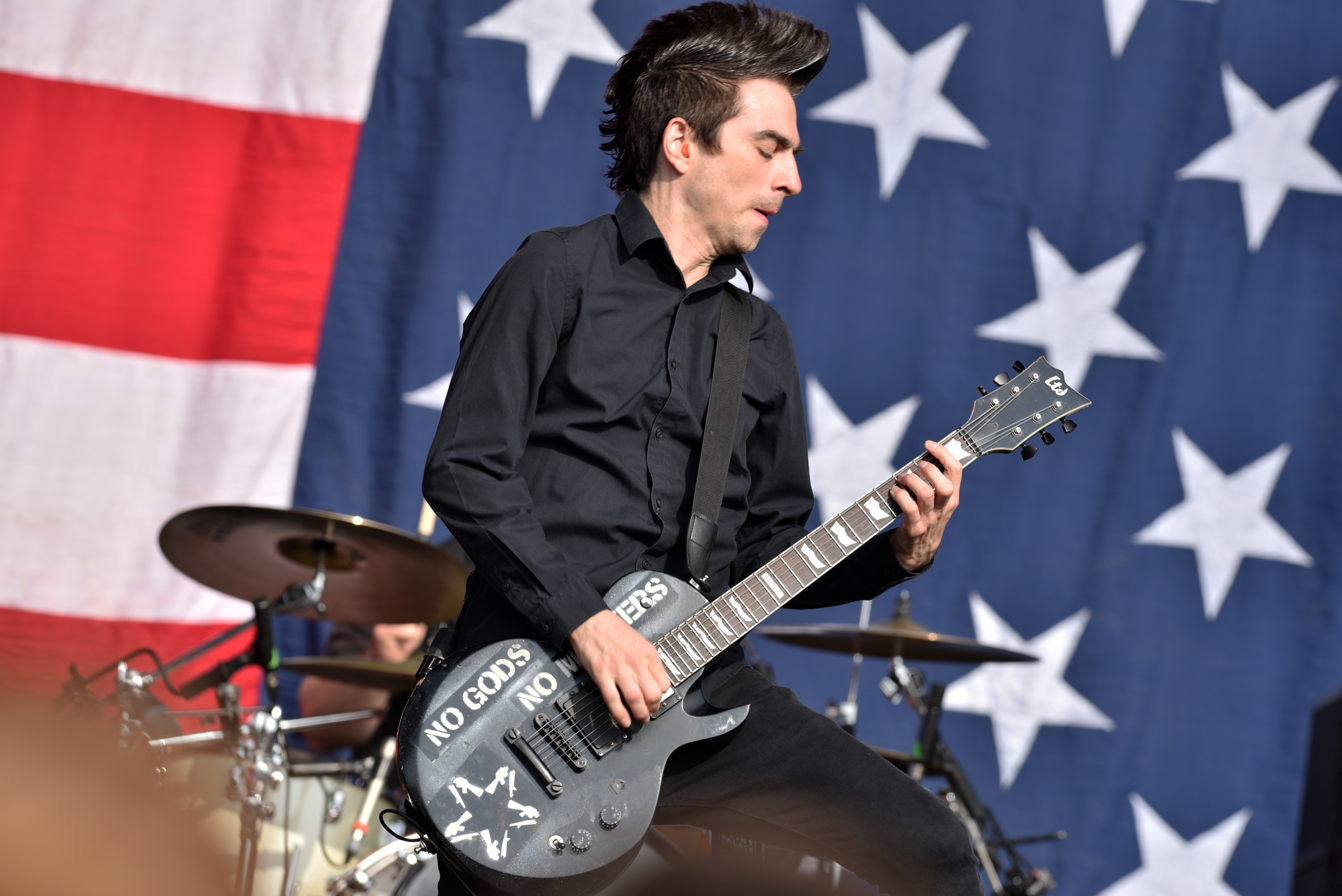
- Sane performing live at Reload Festival 2017

Background information
- Born: Justin Cathal Geever; February 21, 1973 (age 53); Pittsburgh, Pennsylvania, U.S.
- Genres: Punk rock; hardcore punk; skate punk; anarcho-punk
- Occupations: Musician; songwriter
- Instruments: Vocals; guitar
- Years active: 1988–2023
- Labels: RCA; Fat Wreck Chords; A-F; Sideonedummy
- Formerly of: Anti-Flag

Justin Cathal Geever (born February 21, 1973), known professionally as Justin Sane, is an American singer and guitarist. He was the lead guitarist, singer and songwriter of Anti-Flag, a punk rock band formed in 1988 in Pittsburgh, Pennsylvania that was known for its left-wing political views.

In 2023, Anti-Flag abruptly disbanded following multiple rape allegations made against Sane. He is currently being sued for rape under New York's Adult Survivors Act. Sane holds dual United States and Irish citizenship.

== Music career ==
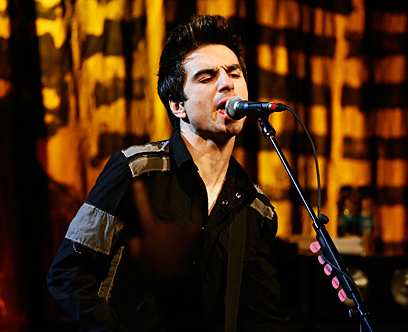
Sane in 2008

In 1988, Sane formed Anti-Flag with friend Pat Thetic. In a 2014 interview, Sane claimed that their first performance as a band occurred at his high school, that the band truly solidified in 1993, and that the 1988 iteration had "very little similarit[ies]" with "what Anti-Flag later became."

In 1996, they released their first album, Die for the Government. Later that year, Andy Flag left the band as a result of personal disputes. Various band members came and went during 1997 and 1998, after which they finally settled on a permanent line-up consisting of Sane as lead guitarist/vocalist, Thetic as drummer, Chris Head as guitarist/backing vocalist, and Chris "#2" Barker as bassist/second vocalist. In 1998, the band released their second album, Their System Doesn't Work For You.

In 1999 Anti-Flag released their third album, A New Kind of Army, and founded their own label, A-F Records. In 2001, they signed to Fat Wreck Chords after discussions with the label's owner, "Fat Mike" Burkett. Following their switch to Fat Wreck Chords, the band released Underground Network.

Mobilize, recorded shortly after the September 11, 2001 attacks, was released early 2002. Anti-Flag released a split CD with Bouncing Souls seven months later. 2003 saw the release of The Terror State, produced by Tom Morello of Rage Against the Machine. Anti-Flag's first DVD, Death of a Nation, was released in 2004. The DVD includes live footage, three music videos, an interview with the band, behind-the-scenes tour footage, and three montages compiled by the band.

In 2006, Anti-Flag released For Blood and Empire on RCA Records. The Bright Lights of America was released in 2008.

On March 4, 2009, Sane jumped into the crowd at a concert at the LCR in Norwich to stop a scuffle which broke out and landed awkwardly, breaking his collar bone. This caused Anti-Flag to cancel the remainder of their tour with Rise Against and their upcoming headlining tour of Europe. The same year, a 2-track split album with Rise Against was released, originally given away with any merchandise purchase on the 2009 Rise Against/Anti-Flag/Flobots UK tour.

== Discography ==
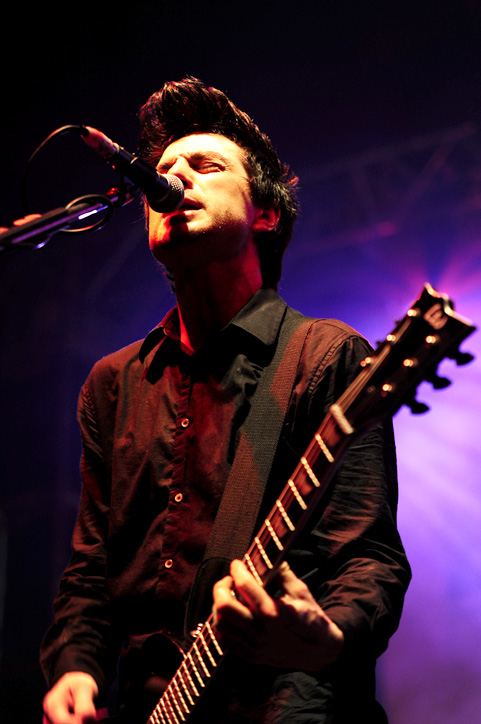
Sane performing with Anti-Flag in 2010

Anti-Flag:

- Die for the Government (1996)
- North America Sucks (1998)
- Their System Doesn't Work for You (1998)
- A New Kind of Army (1999)
- Underground Network (2001)
- Mobilize (2002)
- BYO Split Series, Vol 4 (2002)
- The Terror State (2003)
- For Blood and Empire (2006)
- A Benefit for the Victims of Violent Crime (2007)
- The Bright Lights of America (2008)
- The People or the Gun (2009)
- The General Strike (2012)
- American Spring (2015)
- American Fall (2017)
- American Reckoning (2018)
- 20/20 Vision (2020)
- Lies They Tell Our Children (2023)

Solo:

- Life, Love, and the Pursuit of Justice (2002)
- These are the Days EP (2002)
- Gas Land Terror EP (2011)

== Rape allegations ==
On July 19, 2023, Anti-Flag abruptly disbanded via a brief Patreon statement in the middle of a European tour. Publications including Stereogum and Us Weekly linked the breakup to sexual assault allegations made on a podcast against an anonymous "singer in a political punk band", believed to be Sane. On July 21, the mental health nonprofit organization Punk Rock Saves Lives severed ties with Sane.

On July 26, Sane denied the accusations as "categorically false" through a statement on his reactivated Instagram account. In a separate statement, his bandmates said Anti-Flag broke up as Sane's alleged behavior contradicted the band's values.

On September 5, Rolling Stone published an exposé revealing twelve more women and girls, the youngest at 12 years old, who accused Sane of predatory behavior, sexual assault, and statutory rape in alleged incidents dating from the 1990s to 2020. Following the release of the article, Sane's former bandmates, Thetic, Head, and Barker, released a statement directly condemning Sane, stating they believed he was "in need of serious professional help" and that "it appears you used our beliefs as a cover for egregious activities that you clearly knew we would never condone."

On November 23, 2023, the woman who made the initial allegation sued Sane under New York's Adult Survivors Act for allegedly raping her in 2010 when she was 21; the case was later removed to the federal level, being tried in the Northern District of New York. In March 2024, the woman's legal team announced that they had learned that Sane sold his Pittsburgh home and transferred funds to an Irish bank account, where he holds dual citizenship, and later claimed that Sane had successfully fled the country, although her legal team could not confirm the country to which Sane moved. The woman's legal team stated that they believed Sane had victimized approximately 60 women and girls since the 1990s, and the woman stated, "They are people, many in the U.S. that I talk to regularly, and many in Europe, Australia, Canada, South America. . . . I talked to dozens and dozens of women who [were] desperate to see something happen." Sane refused to accept the service of the lawsuit, resulting in a default judgment being entered against him. On July 22, 2025, Judge Brenda K. Sannes ordered him to pay $1.92 million in damages to the plaintiff, including $750,000 in punitive damages, noting the significant psychological trauma that she had suffered in the years following the assault.
