= Lee Kyung-hae =

South Korean activist (1947–2003)

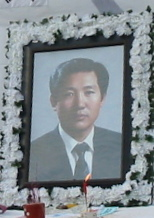

Korean name
- Hangul: 이경해
- Hanja: 李京海
- RR: I Gyeonghae
- MR: I Kyŏnghae

Lee Kyung-hae (Korean: 이경해; 1947 – September 10, 2003) was a South Korean farmer and activist who opposed neo-liberal globalization and protested for the local farmers and fishermen of his home country whose jobs were threatened. He was president of the Federation of Farmers and Fishermen of Korea. He died by suicide at the 2003 WTO conference in Cancún, Mexico.

== Early life and education ==
Lee Kyung Hae was born in Jangsu, Jeollabuk-do, in what was then a united Korea. He graduated from Seoul Agricultural College in 1974 and pursued farming as a career, even though farming was not seen at that time as a logical career for college graduates. He established a dairy farm on what had been a deserted wasteland, and developed it to a capacity of seventy cows. He also developed vegetable farms and opened all of his farms to agricultural students seeking real-life experience. It was during that time that Lee married Kim Baek-i, a journalist for the local Mountains magazine.

== Activism ==
In 1979, he was elected president of the Jangsu Livestock Breeders Association. Throughout the 1980s he worked to improve the situation of farmers nationwide, and as a result of his efforts he was elected to many prominent agricultural positions. He became president of the Jangsu Young Farmers Association in 1983 and the larger Jeonbuk Young Farmers Association in 1987. In response to falling crop prices, he participated in the establishment of the Korean Young Farmers Association. His actions gained the attention of the FAO (The Food and Agricultural Organization) of the UN, and in 1989 Lee was given the award for ‘Farmer of the Year’. In 1989, he was elected president of the Korean Advanced Farmers Federation, and held this position until 1991. In 1990, he started the social activist magazine Korean Young Farmers’ Weekly News.

In the 1990s, Lee adopted more visible methods in his battle for the Korean farmer. He became a member of the provincial legislature when he was elected three times to serve in the Jeonbuk Provincial Assembly. When the South Korean government attempted to stop the second Nationwide Meeting of the Korean Young Farmers Association, Lee led a hunger strike in protest.

Hunger strikes continued to be a common tactic for Lee in his struggle against the World Trade Organization. According to him, the WTO's trade policies destroyed South Korean farmers, reducing them to poverty or worse. In 1993, he attempted suicide at the WTO's Geneva, Switzerland, offices, but was hospitalized and recovered. Lee led a hunger strike in 1994, when the WTO put pressure on South Korea to open its markets to foreign agricultural products. He remained for seventeen days outside the National Assembly Building, in an effort to persuade parliament to pass a law against the WTO. In December 2000, Lee Kyung-hae went on another hunger strike for twenty-six days.

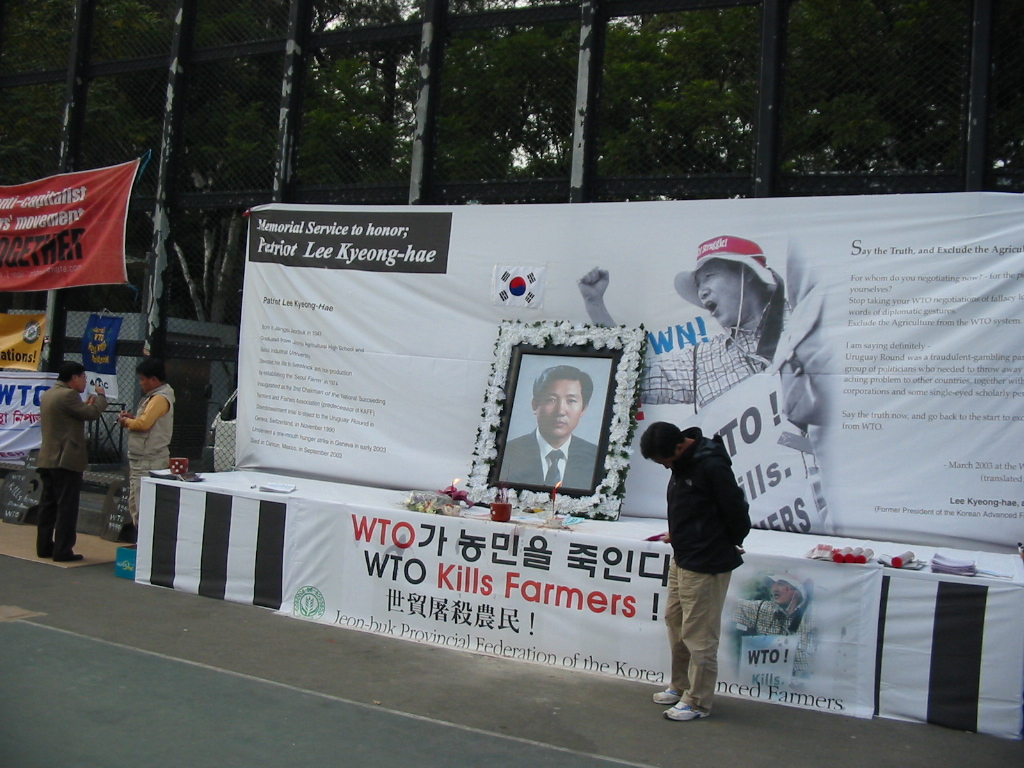
Lee Kyung Hae's memorial setting during WTOMC6

In February and March 2003, Lee led a hunger strike at WTO headquarters in Geneva, but his actions were ignored by the WTO and by mainstream media. However, Lee's hunger strike and his continued statements concerning the effect of rapidly dropping crop prices on Korean farmers were reported in many local newspapers. In Cancun, Lee joined a march of over 15,000 other farmers and indigenous people from around the world and carried a sandwich board that stated, "WTO Kills Farmers."

=== Death ===
On September 10, 2003, Lee stood on top of a police barricade at a major protest demonstration near the WTO conference in Cancún, Mexico, and in front of media television cameras he stabbed himself. Although he was rushed to a local hospital, he died during surgery. The cause of death was officially ruled as a suicide.

Lee is sometimes seen as a martyr to the anti-globalization movement. His death is seen by opponents of neo-liberal globalization as an example of the destructive effects of free trade on the lives of workers.

== Legacy ==
Apart from different memorial ceremonies, a candlelight vigil was organised for September 10, 2005, in Hong Kong to commemorate the victims of the WTO, especially Lee Kyung Hae.

Anti-Flag dedicated their song, "The WTO Kills Farmers" to Lee Kyung Hae, as well as Percy Schmeiser and other farmers hurt by the WTO's policies.

Ahleuchatistas has a song named "Lee Kyung Hae" in dedication to his activism.

== See also ==
- Politics of South Korea
