= Lies They Tell Our Children =

Studio album by Anti-Flag
- Released: January 6, 2023
- Recorded: April–May 2022
- Studio: A-F Records; Mr. Smalls Studio; Stress Studios; Studio180; Principal Studio; Ronnie's Place
- Genre: Punk rock
- Length: 33:02
- Label: Spinefarm
- Producer: Jon Lundin

Anti-Flag chronology
20/20 Vision (2020)	Lies They Tell Our Children (2023)

Singles from Lies They Tell Our Children
- 1. "Laugh. Cry. Smile. Die." Released: July 29, 2022; 2. "The Fight of Our Lives" Released: August 10, 2022; 3. "Imperialism" Released: September 7, 2022; 4. "Modern Meta Medicine" Released: October 5, 2022; 5. "Nvrevr" Released: November 2, 2022; 6. "Victory or Death (We Gave 'Em Hell)" Released: December 2, 2022; 7. "Sold Everything" Released: January 6, 2023; 8. "Shallow Graves" Released: February 3, 2023

Lies They Tell Our Children (stylized in all caps) is the thirteenth and final studio album by American punk rock band Anti-Flag from Pittsburgh, Pennsylvania. It was released on January 6, 2023, via Spinefarm Records. Primary production, recording, and mixing was handled by Jon Lundin, while the mastering was done by long-time Anti-Flag producer and mastering engineer Mass Giorgini. It is also the band's first and only concept album, and features multiple guest musicians from notable acts such as Rise Against, Bad Religion, Bad Cop/Bad Cop, Pinkshift, and Silverstein.

== Background ==
Following the release of their previous album, 20/20 Vision, Anti-Flag was forced to put their touring schedule on hold due to the COVID-19 pandemic. This allowed the band to spend much more time than usual on writing and recording their next album. Unlike their previous albums, Lies They Tell Our Children is the band's first concept album that looks at various anti-war, climate devastation, and racism topics, but attempts to go back to the sources of these issues and understand how they came to be.

The album also features a large number of guest musicians that range from friends of the band to different music genres and political perspectives.

== Release and reception ==
Professional ratings
Review scores
Source	Rating
Distorted Sound	8/10
Kerrang!	4/5

The majority of songs from Lies They Tell Our Children were released ahead of the album. Alongside the announcement of the album, the band also released its first single, "Laugh. Cry. Smile. Die.", along with a corresponding music on July 29, 2022. This was followed by six additional singles, all of which featured a guest musician.

In support of the album, the band also embarked on a North American tour ahead of its release, beginning in Burlington, Vermont on September 16, 2022.

Gavin Brown of Distorted Sound called the album "an urgent and supremely well-executed collection of rousing anthems that perfectly encapsulates the rage at the problems that we as a world have faced in recent times". John Longbottom of Kerrang! called it "a truly great and timely album from a band who continue to fearlessly, articulately and aggressively address the issues of the here and now".

== Track listing ==
All tracks are written by Justin Sane, Chris Barker, Chris Head, and Pat Thetic.

Lies They Tell Our Children track listing
No.	Title	Writer(s)	Length
1.	"Sold Everything"		1:30
2.	"Modern Meta Medicine" (featuring Jesse Leach)		3:36
3.	"Laugh. Cry. Smile. Die." (featuring Shane Told)		3:04
4.	"The Fight of Our Lives" (featuring Tim McIlrath and Brian Baker)	Stevie Aiello	2:52
5.	"Imperialism" (featuring Ashrita Kumar)		2:56
6.	"Victory or Death (We Gave 'Em Hell)" (featuring Campino)	Aiello	3:31
7.	"The Hazardous"		3:10
8.	"Shallow Graves" (featuring Tré Burt)		2:30
9.	"Work & Struggle"		2:22
10.	"Nvrevr" (featuring Stacey Dee)		4:40
11.	"Only in My Head"		2:45
Total length:			33:02

Notes

- All songs titles are stylized in all caps.

== Personnel ==
Anti-Flag

- Justin Sane – lead guitar, lead vocals
- Chris Head – rhythm guitar, backing vocals
- Chris Barker – bass, co-lead vocals
- Pat Thetic – drums

Additional musicians

- Jon Lundin – backing vocals
- Josh Massie – backing vocals
- Jesse Leach – vocals (track 2)
- Shane Told – vocals (3)
- Tim McIlrath – vocals (4)
- Brian Baker – guitar (4)
- Ashrita Kumar – vocals (5)
- Campino – vocals (6)
- Tré Burt – vocals (8)
- Stacey Dee – vocals (10)

Technical

- Jon Lundin – production, mixing, engineering
- Mass Giorgini – mastering
- Tom Zwanzger – engineering
- Arnaud Bascunana – engineering
- Vincent Sorg – engineering
- Justin Francis – engineering

Visuals

- Doug Dean – artwork, design, concept
- Josh Massie – photography

== Charts ==
Chart performance for Lies They Tell Our Children
Chart (2023)	Peak position
German Albums (Offizielle Top 100)	6
Swiss Albums (Schweizer Hitparade)	35
UK Album Downloads (OCC)	71
