= A Benefit for Victims of Violent Crime =

EP by Anti-Flag
- Released: October 2, 2007
- Recorded: 2007
- Genre: Punk rock
- Length: 27:37
- Label: A-F Records
- Producers: Dave Schiffman; Anti-Flag

Anti-Flag chronology
For Blood and Empire (2006)	A Benefit for Victims of Violent Crime (2007)	The Bright Lights of America (2008)

Professional ratings
Review scores
Source	Rating
AbsolutePunk.net	(79%) link
Allmusic	3.5/5 stars
Punknews.org	3.5/5 stars
ReadJunk.com	4/5 stars

A Benefit for Victims of Violent Crime provided funds to The Center for Victims of Violence and Crime and features five new Anti-Flag studio tracks along with five live songs recorded at Pittsburgh's Mr. Smalls in April 2007. Bassist Chris #2's family experienced the horror of losing a family member when his sister and her boyfriend were both murdered, leaving behind a young daughter and son. Anti-Flag’s reaction when faced with tragedy was to put together this limited edition benefit EP in hopes that it would help others who have gone through similar situations.

== Track listing ==
No.	Title	Length
1.	"No Paradise"	3:13
2.	"Oh, Katrina (Interlude)"	0:22
3.	"No Future"	2:35
4.	"Anthem for the New Millennium Generation"	3:05
5.	"Corporate Rock Still Sucks"	1:51
6.	"John Ashcroft Was a Nazi (Interlude)"	0:09
7.	"Marc Defiant"	1:10

Live Songs

No.	Title	Length
1.	"No Borders No Nations (Live)"	3:00
2.	"1 Trillion Dollar$ (Live)"	2:49
3.	"Turncoat (Live)"	2:20
4.	"The Project for a New American Century (Live)"	3:38
5.	"911 for Peace (Live)"	3:27

== Personnel ==
- Justin Sane- Guitar & Lead Vocals
- Chris Head- Guitar & Vocals
- Chris #2- Bass & Lead Vocals
- Pat Thetic- Drums

== See also ==
- Victims' rights
