= 20/20 Vision (Anti-Flag album) =

Studio album by Anti-Flag
- Released: January 17, 2020
- Recorded: July–August 2019
- Studio: Dog House Studios; MDDN Studio
- Genre: Punk rock
- Length: 30:34
- Label: Spinefarm
- Producer: Matt Good

Anti-Flag chronology
American Fall (2017)	20/20 Vision (2020)	Lies They Tell Our Children (2023)

Singles from 20/20 Vision
- 1. "Christian Nationalists" Released: October 4, 2019

20/20 Vision is the twelfth studio album by American punk rock band Anti-Flag from Pittsburgh, Pennsylvania. It was released on January 17, 2020, via Spinefarm Records. Recording sessions took place at Dog House Studios and at MDDN Studio from July to August 2019. Production was handled by Matt Good.

The album focuses on themes of anti-fascism and political optimism in the face of distressing circumstances, and encourages its audience to organize and work towards a better future. It also directly names former president Donald Trump as the cause of many of these issues, and acts as a direct attack against the former president. On October 30, 2020, a deluxe version of the album including 5 new songs was released titled 20/20 Division.

== Background ==
In the past, Anti-Flag has chosen not to directly name politicians in their music. However, the band's heavy opposition of former president Donald Trump influenced them to write songs that were more direct in their view of the former president. Frontman Justin Sane explained this decision to Billboard in an interview:

Normally we've never named a president. We wanted our songs to stay relevant in the future. We have a song called "Outbreak" that's about Bill Clinton, but we didn't use his name. Our song "Turncoat" could be about today; If you named George Bush, though, it dates the song. We think in terms of Woody Guthrie; "This Land Is Your Land" is as relevant today as when he wrote it, and we've always tried to stay in that spirit. But with this record we were like, "Look, Donald Trump IS the problem, so we have to go directly at the problem." You could say he's a symptom of a larger problem and I believe that's true, but he IS the symptom. He's a symbol of authoritarianism the country has moved towards, trying to roll back civil rights, LGBT rights. That's why the first track, "Hate Conquers All," opens with a sound clip of Donald Trump, and from there we tried to move forward with the record and present a different kind of vision.

Some of the other topics covered on 20/20 Vision include gun violence and religion.

== Release and reception ==
Anti-Flag released the album's first single, "Christian Nationalists", on October 4, 2019, while also announcing a European tour the following year. This was accompanied by a statement on the band's website explaining the song's meaning, while also providing lists of republican politicians and sources indicating that said politicians had accepted large amounts of donations from the NRA and gun lobbyists for the politician's support for certain policies and actions. The post also included a list of mass shooting that have occurred in the United States.

Professional ratings
Review scores
Source	Rating
Exclaim!	7/10
Kerrang!	3/5

20/20 Vision was officially announced later that month alongside the release of a new song; "Hate Conquers All" and its accompanying music video. Two additional songs, "Unbreakable" and "The Disease", were also released with music videos ahead of the album, which released on January 17, 2020.

The album was met with mostly positive feedback. Scott Waldman of Alternative Press called it "a lyrically focused and melodically catchy punch", while Tom Shepherd of Kerrang! praised the album's optimistic themes. Kevin Klemp of Exclaim! felt that the album wasn't as innovative for the band, but still praised it for the production value.

Anti-Flag were set to embark on a world tour for most of 2020, but many of the shows they had planned were ultimately delayed to 2021 due to the COVID-19 pandemic. Prior to the tour resuming, the band released a deluxe version of the album titled 20/20 Division, which included five previously unreleased songs, on October 30, 2020.

== Track listing ==
20/20 Vision track listing
No.	Title	Length
1.	"Hate Conquers All"	2:46
2.	"It Went Off Like a Bomb"	2:23
3.	"20/20 Vision"	2:26
4.	"Christian Nationalist"	2:44
5.	"Don't Let the Bastards Get You Down"	2:49
6.	"Unbreakable"	3:08
7.	"The Disease"	2:55
8.	"A Nation Sleeps"	2:17
9.	"You Make Me Sick"	3:01
10.	"Un-American"	3:10
11.	"Resistance Frequencies"	2:55
Total length:		30:34

20/20 Division – Deluxe edition
No.	Title	Length
12.	"Born to Run"	2:12
13.	"Concrete Breeds Apathy"	1:31
14.	"No Allegiance to a Flag"	2:01
15.	"No One Can Save Yourself But You"	2:22
16.	"Fight Like Hell"	3:26
Total length:		42:06

== Personnel ==
Anti-Flag

- Justin Sane – guitar, vocals
- Chris Head – guitar, vocals
- Chris Barker – bass, vocals
- Pat Thetic – drums

Production

- Matt Good – producer, engineering & mixing
- Bradley Cook – assistant engineering
- Mass Giorgini – mastering

Artwork

- Doug Dean – artwork and design

Additional musicians

- Matt Good – background vocals
- Charlotte 2.0 – background vocals
- Chlo$ – background vocals
- Jen Razavi – background vocals
- Jenna Martin – background vocals
- Joey Briggs – background vocals
- Jon Barker – background vocals
- Josh Massie – background vocals
- Lauren Denitzio – background vocals
- Nicholas Martin – background vocals
- Will Perza – background vocals
- Matt Appleton – alto horn, baritone and tenor saxophone, trombone
- John Christianson – trumpet
- Stevie Aiello – composer

== Charts ==
Chart performance for 20/20 Vision
Chart (2020)	Peak position
Austrian Albums (Ö3 Austria)	51
German Albums (Offizielle Top 100)	41
Swiss Albums (Schweizer Hitparade)	45
US Top Tastemaker Albums (Billboard)	19
