= WRUW-FM =

Radio station at Case Western Reserve University

- Cleveland, Ohio; United States
- Broadcast area: Greater Cleveland
- Frequency: 91.1 MHz
- Branding: WRUW FM 91.1

Programming
- Format: College/variety

Ownership
- Owner: Case Western Reserve University

History
- Founded: 1946
- First air date: February 26, 1967
- Call sign meaning: Western Reserve University

Technical information
- Licensing authority: FCC
- Facility ID: 9255
- Class: B1
- ERP: 15,000 watts
- HAAT: 89 meters (292 ft)
- Transmitter coordinates: 41°31′14.00″N 81°35′3.00″W

Links
- Public license information: Public file; LMS
- Webcast: Listen live
- Website: wruw.org

WRUW-FM (91.1 FM) is a non-commercial educational radio station licensed to Cleveland, Ohio. Owned by Case Western Reserve University, the station serves Greater Cleveland and is student-run, carrying a combined college and variety format. WRUW-FM's studios are located in the Mather Memorial Building on the Case Western Reserve campus at University Circle, while the station's transmitter resides in East Cleveland.

== History ==
WRUW has its earliest roots in "WFSM", started in 1946 by the Flora Stone Mather Radio Club at what was then Western Reserve University which presented programming via a public address system. This was followed by the AM carrier current station WRAR in 1955. Finally, on February 26, 1967, the FCC granted a license under the call sign WRUW-FM. Western Reserve merged with Case Institute of Technology five months later.

WRUW began as a 10-watt monoaural station, gained stereo capability in 1974 and saw a power increase to 1,000 watts in 1980.

WRUW's power was boosted to its current level of 15,000 watts on March 5, 2002.

Over the years, WRUW has worked to maintain ties to the community, co-sponsoring events with Case Western Reserve University and other University Circle institutions, maintaining a relationship with the Hessler Street Fair, and providing a voice for community members not otherwise associated with Case Western Reserve University.

== Current programming ==
WRUW is open to both students and members of the Cleveland community. Completion of a semester-long training course is required.

Summer events include Studio-A-Rama (mainly Indie rock and pop acts), usually held the Saturday after Labor Day.
