= Rock'n with Father Mike =

Rock'n With Father Mike

EP by Anti-Flag / The Bad Genes
- Released: 1993
- Genre: Punk rock

Anti-Flag chronology
Rock'n With Father Mike (1993)	Kill Kill Kill (1995)

Rock'n With Father Mike is a 7-inch split EP released by Anti-Flag and the Bad Genes. It contains some of the oldest Anti-Flag recordings, as it was released in 1993 when they had newly formed the band. Possibly the rarest Anti-Flag record, it is highly sought after by fans today. The title is a reference to a punk rock preacher who was known as Father Mike. There are three known versions of the record. One has a pink cover, one has a light blue cover, and one has a yellow cover.

== Track listing ==
Side A (Anti-Flag)

1. "I Don't Want to Be Like You"
2. "Fuck the Pope"

Side B (The Bad Genes)

1. "Salute"
2. "Chords That Cut"
