= American Fall =

Studio album by Anti-Flag
- Released: November 3, 2017
- Recorded: May–June 2017
- Studio: NRG Studios (North Hollywood, CA); MDDN Studios
- Genre: Punk rock
- Length: 30:29
- Label: Spinefarm
- Producer: Anti-Flag; Benji Madden

Anti-Flag chronology
American Spring (2015)	American Fall (2017)	20/20 Vision (2020)

Singles from American Fall
- 1. "American Attraction" Released: August 18, 2017

Professional ratings
Aggregate scores
Source	Rating
Metacritic	72/100
Review scores
Source	Rating
Exclaim!	8/10
Rock Sound	7/10

American Fall is the eleventh studio album by American punk rock band Anti-Flag, from Pittsburgh, Pennsylvania. It was released on November 3, 2017, via Spinefarm Records, making it their second record released through the label. In the US, the album debuted at No. 17 on the Hard Rock Albums chart, No. 11 on the Independent Albums chart, and No. 10 on the Tastemakers chart. The album featured cover art by artist Noah Scalin.

== Track listing ==
All tracks are written by Justin Sane, Chris Head, Chris Barker, Pat Thetic, and Stevie Aiello, except where noted.

No.	Title	Length
1.	"American Attraction"	2:56
2.	"The Criminals"	2:44
3.	"When the Wall Falls"	2:46
4.	"Trouble Follows Me"	3:09
5.	"Finish What We Started"	2:49
6.	"Liar"	1:53
7.	"Digital Blackout"	3:26
8.	"I Came. I Saw. I Believed."	2:01
9.	"Racists"	3:20
10.	"Throw It Away"	2:50
11.	"Casualty"	2:35
Total length:		30:29

== Personnel ==
Anti-Flag
- Justin Sane – guitar, vocals, songwriter
- Chris Head – guitar, vocals, songwriter
- Chris Barker – bass, vocals, songwriter
- Pat Thetic – drums, songwriter

Production

- Benji Madden – producer
- Stevie Aiello – co-producer, songwriter
- Dan Lancaster – mixing (tracks: 1, 11)
- Brian Knapp Gardner – mastering
- Courtney Ballard – engineering
- Colin Schwanke – assistant engineering
- Patrick Kehrier – assistant engineering
- Will McCoy – assistant engineering

Artwork

- Doug Dean – artwork & design
- Nathan Inglesby – artwork
- Noah Scalin – artwork

Additional musicians

- Kevin Bivona – Hammond B3 organ (track 3)
- Brian Marquis – backing vocals
- Allie Snow – backing vocals
- Joey Briggs LaRocca – backing vocals
- Sherry Saeedi – backing vocals
- Will Perza – backing vocals
- Justin Francis – backing vocals, mixing (tracks: 2–10)

== Chart ==
Chart	Peak position
Austrian Albums (Ö3 Austria)	51
German Albums (Offizielle Top 100)	67
US Top Hard Rock Albums (Billboard)	7
