= Death of a Nation (video) =

Video by Anti-Flag
- Released: October 26, 2004
- Recorded: 2003–2004
- Genre: Punk rock Streetpunk; Hardcore punk
- Length: 1:00:47
- Label: A-F Records

Anti-Flag chronology
The Terror State (2003)	Death of a Nation (2004)	For Blood and Empire (2006)

Professional ratings
Review scores
Source	Rating
Punknews.org	4/5 stars

Death of a Nation is a live DVD by Anti-Flag. It was filmed throughout The Terror State tour at a variety of North American shows. Death of a Nation features a variety of performances in different types of venues.

== Track listing ==
1. "Death of a Nation" – 1:58
2. "Turncoat" – 2:22
3. "Got The Numbers" – 2:52
4. "You Can Kill the Protester, But You Can't Kill the Protest" – 2:21
5. "This Machine Kills Fascists" – 2:10
6. "Underground Network" – 3:27
7. "Rank-n-File" – 3:42
8. "Bring Out Your Dead" – 2:09
9. "Captain Anarchy" – 2:42
10. "Sold as Freedom" – 2:13
11. "No Borders, No Nations" – 3:00
12. "Tearing Everyone Down" – 2:53
13. "911 for Peace" – 3:20
14. "Mind the G.A.T.T." – 3:01
15. "Power to the Peaceful" – 2:53
16. "Angry, Young and Poor" – 2:41
17. "Watch the Right" – 2:44
18. "A New Kind of Army" – 3:36
19. "Post-War Breakout" – 2:42
20. "Spaz's House Destruction Party" – 3:21
21. "That's Youth" – 3:03
22. "Die for the Government" – 3:23
23. "Fuck the Flag" – 2:14

== Bonus material ==
- Death of a Nation Video (previously unreleased)
- Post-War Breakout Video (previously unreleased)
- Turncoat Video
- Behind the scenes content from the "Turncoat" video
- Band Interview
- Live Radio Show
- Behind the scenes tour footage
