= For Blood and Empire =

Studio album by Anti-Flag
- Released: March 21, 2006
- Recorded: May 2005
- Genre: Punk rock
- Length: 38:58
- Label: RCA
- Producer: Anti-Flag, David Schiffman

Anti-Flag chronology
Death of a Nation (2004)	For Blood and Empire (2006)	A Benefit for Victims of Violent Crime (2007)

Singles from For Blood and Empire
- 1. "This Is the End (For You My Friend)" Released: August 8, 2006

Professional ratings
Review scores
Source	Rating
AbsolutePunk.net	(80%) link
Allmusic	link
Punknews.org	link
Punktastic.com	link
Kerrang!	3/5 stars

For Blood and Empire is the sixth studio album by the American punk rock band Anti-Flag. It was released on March 21, 2006. It was the band's first release on RCA Records, which caused the band to receive criticism from many due to their initially anti-corporate message.

== Background ==
The booklet which comes with the CD contains a short essay for all but two songs ("State Funeral" and "Cities Burn") which gives more in-depth perspective on the inspirations for the song subjects such as the Downing Street Memo and Monsanto Company Corporation, as well as information on one of Anti-Flag's side projects, Military Free Zone. The CD also comes with two stencils, of the "Gunstar", a star formed with broken M-16s as seen on the cover of Mobilize, and the phrase "What are we going to do about the U.S.A.?".

Mike Ski of The A.K.A.s did the art direction, design and layout design for the album art.

The song "Emigre" (which on the promotional version was originally called "Exodus") includes an adaptation of Martin Niemöller's poem "First they came".

Songs from the album were used by several video games. "This is the End (For You My Friend)" is used in two EA Sports video games, Madden NFL 07 and NHL 07. "The Press Corpse" is used in the video games Tony Hawk's Downhill Jam and Shaun White Snowboarding.

By April 3, 2008, the album had sold 97,000 copies.

== Track listing ==
For Blood and Empire – Standard edition (bonus track)
No.	Title	Length
1.	"I'd Tell You But…"	2:10
2.	"The Press Corpse"	3:21
3.	"Emigre" (Originally called "Exodus" on the promo version of the album)	3:00
4.	"The Project for a New American Century"	3:17
5.	"Hymn for the Dead"	3:39
6.	"This Is the End (For You My Friend)"	3:11
7.	"1 Trillion Dollar$" (Originally called "One Trillion Dollars" on the promo version)	2:30
8.	"State Funeral"	2:00
9.	"Confessions of an Economic Hit Man"	2:43
10.	"War Sucks, Let's Party!"	2:18
11.	"The W.T.O. Kills Farmers"	3:32
12.	"Cities Burn"	3:03
13.	"Depleted Uranium Is a War Crime"	4:07
Total length:		38:56

For Blood and Empire – Australian and European edition
No.	Title	Length
14.	"Corporate Rock"	1:53
Total length:		40:49

For Blood and Empire – Japanese edition
No.	Title	Length
14.	"The New Millennium Generation" (Also available as a free MP3 download from Military Free Zone)	3:08
Total length:		42:04

For Blood and Empire – Vinyl edition
No.	Title	Length
14.	"Marc Defiant"	1:02
Total length:		39:58

For Blood and Empire – iTunes edition
No.	Title	Length
14.	"No Paradise"	3:17
Total length:		42:13

== Personnel ==
- Justin Sane - guitar, lead vocals on tracks 1, 2, 4, 5, 7, 9, 11, 13
- Chris Head - guitar, backing vocals
- Chris #2 - bass guitar, lead vocals on tracks 1, 3, 6, 8, 10, 12
- Pat Thetic - drums, backing vocals

== Charts ==
Chart performance
Chart (2006)	Peak position
Australian Hitseekers Albums (ARIA)	19
Canadian Albums (Nielsen SoundScan)	69
German Albums (Offizielle Top 100)	73
US Billboard 200	100

== See also ==
- Confessions of an Economic Hit Man (the book for which the song was named)
- Lee Kyung Hae (Track 11 relates to his suicide at an anti-WTO protest)
