= American Spring (Anti-Flag album) =

Studio album by Anti-Flag
- Released: May 26, 2015
- Studio: Jim Kaufman Productions (Los Angeles, CA)
- Genre: Punk rock
- Length: 40:31
- Label: Spinefarm
- Producer: Anti-Flag; Jim Kaufman; Kenny Carkeet

Anti-Flag chronology
The General Strike (2012)	American Spring (2015)	American Fall (2017)

Professional ratings
Aggregate scores
Source	Rating
Metacritic	54/100
Review scores
Source	Rating
Alternative Press	4/5 stars
PopMatters	3/10 stars

American Spring is the tenth studio album by American punk rock band Anti-Flag from Pittsburgh, Pennsylvania. It was released on May 26, 2015 via Spinefarm Records, making it their first record released through the label (their previous two albums were dropped via SideOneDummy Records). The fourteen-track record featured guest appearances from Tim Armstrong of Rancid on the song "Bradenburg Gate" and Tom Morello of Rage Against the Machine on the song "Without End". The album debuted at #22 on the Top Rock Albums, #17 on the Alternative Albums, #5 on the Hard Rock Albums, and #15 on the Independent Albums.

A lyric music video for the album's first single, "Fabled World" was released in March 2015. The second single "Sky Is Falling" was released a month later. A music video for "Brandenburg Gate" was released on May 19.

== Track listing ==
No.	Title	Length
1.	"Fabled World"	3:16
2.	"The Great Divide"	1:28
3.	"Brandenburg Gate" (featuring Tim Armstrong)	3:30
4.	"Sky Is Falling"	4:14
5.	"Walk Away"	3:14
6.	"Song for Your Enemy"	3:18
7.	"Set Yourself on Fire"	2:46
8.	"All of the Poison, All of the Pain"	3:06
9.	"Break Something"	2:48
10.	"Without End" (featuring Tom Morello)	3:08
11.	"Believer"	2:55
12.	"To Hell With Boredom"	0:48
13.	"Low Expectations"	2:46
14.	"The Debate Is Over (If You Want It)"	3:16
Total length:		40:31

== Personnel ==
- Justin Sane – guitar, vocals, producer
- Chris Head – guitar, vocals, producer
- Chris #2 – bass, vocals, producer
- Pat Thetic – drums, producer
- Tim Armstrong – additional vocals on "Brandenburg Gate"
- Tom Morello – additional guitar on "Without End"
- Jim Kaufman – tambourine, producer
- Kenny Carkeet – producer
- Mass Giorgini – mastering
- Ryan Hewitt – mixing
- Doug Dean – artwork & design

== Charts ==
Chart (2015)	Peak position
Austrian Albums (Ö3 Austria)	53
German Albums (Offizielle Top 100)	62
US Top Current Albums (Billboard)	98
US Independent Albums (Billboard)	15
US Top Hard Rock Albums (Billboard)	5
US Top Rock Albums (Billboard)	22
