= Underground Network =

Studio album by Anti-Flag
- Released: April 24, 2001
- Recorded: November 1, 2000 – February 3, 2001
- Genre: Hardcore punk
- Length: 37:49
- Label: Fat Wreck Chords
- Producer: Mass Giorgini

Anti-Flag chronology
A New Kind of Army (1999)	Underground Network (2001)	Mobilize (2002)

Professional ratings
Review scores
Source	Rating
Allmusic	4/5 stars

Underground Network is Anti-Flag's third studio album, released on Fat Wreck Chords in 2001. Widely considered to be the band's breakthrough album, it helped make Anti-Flag a household name in the U.S. punk scene with tracks such as "Underground Network," "Bring Out Your Dead," and "Stars and Stripes."

The title "This Machine Kills Fascists" pays tribute to folk-music hero Woody Guthrie, who had a guitar labeled with the same slogan.

== Background ==
In 2000, Anti-Flag went on the Vans Warped Tour, where they met Fat Mike, head of Fat Wreck Chords. The band had originally tried to get their previous album, A New Kind of Army, released on the label, but Mike had turned them down, offering to release it on Honest Don's Records due to the band being different than the other bands on Fat. Instead, the band released the album on Go-Kart Records and A-F Records, their own label. Mike told them on the tour that he had been impressed with them turning him down, and offered to release their next album on Fat. The band accepted, and they went into the studio in November of that year to start recording. Having co-produced their last 2 albums with Joe West, the band asked Squirtgun bassist and producer Mass Giorgini to produce the album, in order to make them sound better. According to Justin, "I could write half decent songs. The problem was that we couldn't play them very well. Luckily...Mass Giorgini found a way to help us sound like better musicians than we were at the time."

== Writing and Recording ==
The band worked on the album throughout November, and January through February. Mass had originally told Pat that it would take about an hour to record each song, although it took the band three months to finish it. All of the songs were recorded at Giorigini's studio, Sonic Iguana Studios. Musically, the album is heavier than their previous albums. The album's lyrics were inspired by the writings of Noam Chomsky, Howard Zinn, and Matthew Rothschild. This is the first album to feature material written by Chris #2, as the bass parts on the last album had already been written by the time he joined the band. The album is also the first to include political essays in the booklet, which would become a fixture in most of their future albums.

== Music ==
Angry, Young and Poor is similar to the song Born to Die, off of Their System Doesn't Work for You, and features commentary on the problems facing the American Youth. This Machine Kills Fascists is a hardcore style song that attacks the Neo-Nazi punks who had tried to infiltrate the Pittsburgh punk scene. The title track is a slower, more melodic track and features a guitar solo from Justin. The song criticizes American Mainstream Media, and calls for the use of alternative news media.

"I worked for a long time on the bass lines for this session. It was my first with the full band. Also the first record I wrote and sang songs on. It was nerve wracking. But the rest of the band were there the whole time. It really started the trend of us backing each other up no matter what the idea." -Chris #2

Daddy Warbux is the first song to feature Chris #2 singing lead vocals, and is a straightforward punk song. Vieques, Puerto Rico draws attention to the US Government's use of Puerto Rico for military training and munitions testing, and the protests by the citizens there against the practice. Stars and Stripes is another slower track that features an ongoing bass riff backed by heavy power chords. Watch the Right is a warning against center-right politicians that try to masquerade as liberals. The Panama Deception is the heaviest song on the record, and mentions the 1997 movie Wag the Dog, while connecting it to the Bush-led Invasion of Panama in 1989. Culture Revolution also features a guitar solo from Justin, and calls for a revolution against the apathy and consumerism pushed by the media.

Spaz's House Destruction Party was based on an actual party that the band had been a part of in 1994. The band's friend, Spaz, had organized a three-day party to commemorate being evicted, and the house was destroyed after only one night, which resulted in the police being called. Spaz would make an appearance on the band's next album, Mobilize, where he was featured on a live version of the song and explained some of the inaccuracies in the song.

Bring Out Your Dead was the first song Chris wrote for the band. He later said that he was inspired to write the song after watching Ralph Nader speak on C-SPAN. A part of Nader's speech would be included in the track. The song also features Chris using screaming vocals, which would also be a feature in future Anti-Flag songs. A Start is similar to The Panama Deception, and accuses schools of taking away students' creativity and individuality, and for not teaching about important historical events.

Until It Happens to You was written back in 1998 and performed while the band was on tour in Canada, when Jamie Towns was still playing in the band. Justin dedicated the song to "political prisoners like Leonard Peltier and Mumia Abu-Jamal".

== Track listing ==
All tracks are written by Justin Sane except as noted.

No.	Title	Writer	Length
1.	"Angry, Young and Poor"		2:42
2.	"This Machine Kills Fascists"		1:38
3.	"Underground Network"		4:03
4.	"Daddy Warbux"	Chris #2	2:16
5.	"Vieques, Puerto Rico: Bikini Revisited"		3:11
6.	"Stars and Stripes"		3:33
7.	"Watch the Right"		2:52
8.	"The Panama Deception"		3:03
9.	"Culture Revolution"		3:41
10.	"Spaz's House Destruction Party"		3:04
11.	"Bring Out Your Dead"	Chris #2	2:14
12.	"A Start"		2:45
13.	"Until It Happens to You"		2:48
Total length:			37:49

== Personnel ==
- Justin Sane - guitar, lead vocals on tracks 1–3, 5–10, 12, 13
- Chris Head - guitar, backing vocals
- Chris #2 (credited as #2 Chris) - bass guitar, lead vocals on tracks 4 and 11
- Pat Thetic - drums

== Legacy ==
Angry, Young and Poor, This Machine Kills Fascists, Underground Network, and Spaz's House Destruction Party would be included in the band's compilation album A Document of Dissent, released in 2014. Underground Network and Spaz's House Destruction Party would be included as live tracks on the band's next album, Mobilize. Spaz's House Destruction Party would also be included in the band's live album Live Vol 2, along with Angry, Young and Poor.

The band would rerecord Bring Out Your Dead for their 20 Years of Hell series. Chris #2 has also frequently played the song during his Instagram live streams.

Chris #2 said in a live video on Instagram that Spaz's House Destruction Party was one of the most requested songs the band would get while on tour, but said that they didn't like playing it live because it was "too long".

== Charts ==
Chart	Peak position
US Independent Albums (Billboard)	23
US Heatseekers Albums (Billboard)	28
