= The General Strike =

Studio album by Anti-Flag
- Released: March 20, 2012
- Recorded: June–December 2011 in Pittsburgh, PA
- Genre: Punk rock
- Length: 27:20
- Label: SideOneDummy
- Producer: Anti-Flag

Anti-Flag chronology
The People or the Gun (2009)	The General Strike (2012)	20 Years of Hell (2013/14)

The General Strike is Anti-Flag's ninth studio album. The album was released on March 20, 2012. The album marks the band's second release for SideOneDummy Records. The first single from the album, "The Neoliberal Anthem" was released to the band's Facebook page in January 2012. The band released a music video for single "This is the New Sound" on March 27, 2012.

== Writing and production ==
In June 2011, Justin Sane announced that the band had begun working on material for their new studio album under the working title, Magnum, which they hoped would be released in the fall. However the change in title led some fans to speculate if it was due to the Occupy Wall Street movement and protests around the world.

== Track listing ==
No.	Title	Length
1.	"Controlled Opposition"	0:22
2.	"The Neoliberal Anthem"	3:18
3.	"1915"	2:52
4.	"This Is the New Sound"	2:46
5.	"Bullshit Opportunist"	2:36
6.	"The Ranks of the Masses Rising"	2:29
7.	"Turn a Blind Eye"	1:19
8.	"Broken Bones"	3:01
9.	"I Don't Wanna"	2:27
10.	"Nothing Recedes Like Progress"	2:18
11.	"Resist"	1:02
12.	"The Ghost of Alexandria"	2:58
Total length:		27:20

iTunes Bonus Track
No.	Title	Length
13.	"Wrong Colour"	2:44
Total length:		30:04

Limited Edition Vinyl Release
No.	Title	Length
13.	"Calling Out"	2:57
Total length:		30:17

10 Year Anniversary Edition
No.	Title	Length
13.	"Whistleblower"	2:39
14.	"Skate"	1:19
Total length:		31:18

== Personnel ==
Anti-Flag

- Justin Sane – guitar, vocals
- Chris #2 – bass, vocals
- Chris Head – guitar, vocals
- Pat Thetic – drums

== Charts ==
Chart	Peak position
US Top Hard Rock Albums (Billboard)	17
US Independent Albums (Billboard)	38
German Albums (Offizielle Top 100)	90
