= The Bright Lights of America =

Studio album by Anti-Flag
- Released: April 1, 2008
- Recorded: 2007–2008
- Genre: Punk rock
- Length: 48:51
- Label: RCA
- Producer: Tony Visconti

Anti-Flag chronology
A Benefit for Victims of Violent Crime (2007)	The Bright Lights of America (2008)	The People or the Gun (2009)

Singles from The Bright Lights of America
- 1. "The Bright Lights of America" Released: February 11, 2008; 2. "The Modern Rome Burning" Released: March 1, 2008

Professional ratings
Aggregate scores
Source	Rating
Metacritic	63/100 link
Review scores
Source	Rating
Allmusic	link
AbsolutePunk.net	(69%) link
Alternative Press	4/5 stars
Sputnikmusic	link
Unglued Reviews	link

The Bright Lights of America is the seventh studio album released by Anti-Flag on April 1, 2008. Much of the album was released on the band's MySpace with twelve of the thirteen tracks on March 24, 2008. It was the first of their albums to feature an orchestral section and child choirs. It was the band's final release on RCA Records.

== Singles and videos ==
The first song released from the album was "Good 'N' Ready", featured on Fat Wreck Chords Hanuk-Comp From the Dreidel to the Grave compilation.

In April 2008 Anti-Flag teamed up with Rage Against the Machine guitarist Tom Morello and a host of roller derby girls for a video for "The Bright Lights of America".

"The video demonstrates the audacity and the craziness of the seemingly endless war... We're trying to get that across in a funny and interesting way. In the video there are different teams that represent various places in the world and various nationalities. Team USA comes out and plays dirty and wipes the floor with everyone. Throughout all that you have Tom Morello as the coach of Team USA - he's a fiery coach and he's out for blood! He gets the ladies to perform at their peak!", bassist Chris #2 told Kerrang!.

The Los Angeles Roller Derby team and a group of fans took part in the 20-hour show, with many suffering on-set injuries; one girl sprained her knee, another broke her collar-bone, according to the magazine.

== Track listing ==
No.	Title	Featuring	Length
1.	"Good and Ready"		3:59
2.	"The Bright Lights of America"		3:32
3.	"Vices"	Clip from Mumia Abu-Jamal at the end of the song	4:59
4.	"The Modern Rome Burning"		4:19
5.	"If You Wanna Steal (You Better Learn How to Lie)"		4:04
6.	"No Warning"		3:00
7.	"Spit in the Face"		4:09
8.	"We Are the Lost"		4:17
9.	"Go West"		4:19
10.	"The Smartest Bomb"		3:48
11.	"Shadow of the Dead"		3:51
12.	"The Ink and the Quill (Be Afraid)"		4:34

== Personnel ==
Anti-Flag

- Justin Sane – Lead vocals, lead guitar
- Chris #2 – Lead vocals, bass
- Chris Head – Rhythm guitar, backing vocals
- Pat Thetic – Drums, percussion

Artwork

- Robert Larson – Album Artwork, album design

Additional musicians

- Benjamin Kowalewicz – additional vocals on "Wake Up the Town"
- Benjamin Karp – Cello
- Patrick Binford – Cello

Production

- Tony Visconti – Producer, mixing, percussion
- Matt Marshall – A&R
- Mass Giorgini – Mastering – LP format
- Emily Lazar – Mastering – CD format
- Mario J. McNulty – Engineer, percussion
- Joe LaPorta – Mastering Assistant
- Tim Price – Assistant Engineer

== Charts ==
Chart (2006)	Peak position
Australian Albums (ARIA Charts)	97
German Albums (Offizielle Top 100)	89
US Billboard 200	118
