= Die for the Government =

Studio album by Anti-Flag
- Released: August 20, 1996
- Genre: Hardcore punk
- Length: 44:51
- Label: New Red Archives
- Producer: Joe West, Anti-Flag

Anti-Flag chronology
Kill Kill Kill (1995)	Die for the Government (1996)	Reject (1997)

Professional ratings
Review scores
Source	Rating
AllMusic	3/5 stars
Maximum Rocknroll	(favorable)
Maximum Rocknroll	(favorable)
PunkNews.org	3/5 stars

Die for the Government is the debut studio album by the U.S. punk rock band Anti-Flag, released in 1996. After this album, bassist Andy Flag played with Anti-Flag on their EP North America Sucks, but left soon after as they couldn't get along as a band. The CD booklet bids farewell to Andy Flag.

The front cover gives the title "Die for the Government", but side of the CD reads "Die for Your Government".

== Song Information ==
"Fuck Police Brutality" was inspired by events at a Queers show Justin Sane once attended.

Many of the songs on the record were written about the local punk scene, and included condemnation against the Nazi Punks that were infiltrating the music scene at the time, accusing them of ruining concerts and committing violent acts against other fans. The rest of the album features social-political songs heavily influenced by the Persian Gulf War back in 1991.

You'd Do the Same, Kill the Rich, and No More Dead are all the same versions that were featured on the Kill Kill Kill EP. Davey Destroyed the Punk Scene was also featured on the ep, although it was rerecorded for the album.

Summer Squatter is a more ska-influenced track than the rest of the album. The album's liner notes described the song as being against punks who came into the scene, ruined it for other fans, then left, and not being against the practice of squatting. Go-Go Dancer describes the protagonist falling in love with a girl who works at a punk show as a go-go dancer, and is unique among the Anti-Flag catalogue as being their only love song.

== Track listing ==
No.	Title	Lead vocals	Length
1.	"You'd Do the Same"	A. Flag	2:23
2.	"Die for the Government"	J. Sane	3:33
3.	"Drink, Drank, Punk"	A. Flag	1:42
4.	"Rotten Future"	A. Flag	2:00
5.	"Safe Tonight"	J. Sane	2:44
6.	"Red, White and Brainwashed"	A. Flag	1:53
7.	"Davey Destroyed the Punk Scene"	A. Flag	2:20
8.	"Summer Squatter Go Home" (Bridge sung by J. Sane)	A. Flag	3:03
9.	"She's My Little Go-Go Dancer"	A. Flag	2:24
10.	"Police State in the USA"	J. Sane	2:39
11.	"Punk by the Book"	J. Sane	2:15
12.	"Fuck Police Brutality"	A. Flag	2:22
13.	"I'm Being Watched by the CIA" (Intro sung by J. Sane)	A. Flag	2:14
14.	"Kill the Rich"	J. Sane	3:05
15.	"No More Dead"	J. Sane	3:51
16.	"Confused Youth"	A. Flag	4:15
17.	"Your Daddy Was a Rich Man, Your Daddy's Fucking Dead"	J. Sane	2:08

== Personnel ==
- Justin Sane – guitars, lead vocals
- Andy Flag – bass, backing vocals, mixing on tracks 4,6,7,8,12,13,16, and 17
- Pat Thetic – drums
- Andy "Reagan" Wheeler, Ricky "Reagan" Wright, Anne Flag, Mike Poisel, Mike Armstrong, Dan D. Lion, Jason DeCosta, and the band Disco Crisis all provided back up vocals.
- Joe West and Anti-Flag – production
