= The People or the Gun =

Studio album by Anti-Flag
- Released: June 9, 2009
- Recorded: December 2008 – March 2009 in Pittsburgh, PA
- Genre: Punk rock
- Length: 31:04
- Label: SideOneDummy
- Producer: Anti-Flag

Anti-Flag chronology
The Bright Lights of America (2008)	The People or the Gun (2009)	The General Strike (2012)

Professional ratings
Aggregate scores
Source	Rating
Metacritic	74/100 link
Review scores
Source	Rating
AbsolutePunk.net	90% link
Ultimate Guitar	link
Allmusic	link
Bombshellzine.com	link
DecoyMusic.com	link
NME	8/10 link
Rock Sound	6/10 stars

The People or the Gun is Anti-Flag's eighth studio album. The album was released on June 9, 2009. It was their first album released on independent label SideOneDummy Records after the band's two-record contract ended with RCA Records. The first track, "Sodom, Gomorrah, Washington D.C. (Sheep In Shepherd's Clothing)", was released on the band's MySpace page prior to the album.

== Writing and production ==
On December 2, 2008, Anti-Flag's bassist, Chris#2, posted in his blog that Anti-Flag had begun the recording of their album with "The Economy is Suffering, Let it Die." By December 18, Chris #2 had posted that nine songs had been completed, and on February 16, 2009, two pictures of the tentative track listing for The People or the Gun were posted on the blog.

In a March 21 interview with bassist Chris #2 in The Edge Magazine, he revealed that the band had recorded seventeen songs, but he wanted to cut the track number down "to a smaller number, ten or eleven," and make it a 30-minute album.

== Promotion ==
The band embarked on two tours to support the release of the album. The Eastpak Antidote Tour co-headlining with Alexisonfire with support acts Four Year Strong and The Ghost of a Thousand, which saw the band doing 35 dates across Europe, between October and November 2009. The Economy Sucks, Let's Party! Tour began in January 2010 and took the band across 22 North American dates, with supporting acts Aiden, Cancer Bats and Fireworks. In February 2010, the band continued the tour into Australia with five performances at the Soundwave Festival.

== Album information ==
In late May 2009, a music video for the album's first single, "When All the Lights Go Out", was released.

A portion of the proceeds from album pre-sales on the SideOneDummy website were donated to Amnesty International. All pre-orders of the album on the SideOneDummy site received a digital download of two bonus songs, "Bring Down Their Wall" and "A Brief Misunderstanding of the Kings and Queens". An album bundle was also available on SideOneDummy's store, which included a three-track EP of unreleased material, plus both a The People or the Gun T-shirt and poster.

The song "The Gre(A)t Depression" includes repeated melodic interpolation of "It's All Over Now, Baby Blue" by Bob Dylan.

It also includes backing vocals from Tim McIlrath from Rise Against, Greg Attonito from Bouncing Souls, Wade MacNeil from Alexisonfire and David McWane from Big D and the Kids Table.

== Track listing ==
=== Standard Edition ===
1. "Sodom, Gomorrah, Washington D.C. (Sheep in Shepherd's Clothing)" – 2:50
2. "The Economy Is Suffering...Let It Die" – 3:36
3. "The Gre(A)t Depression" – 3:08
4. "We Are the One" – 3:07
5. "You Are Fired (Take This Job, Ah, Fuck It)" – 1:00
6. "This Is the First Night" – 3:33
7. "No War Without Warriors (How Do You Sleep?)" – 2:28
8. "When All the Lights Go Out" – 3:08
9. "On Independence Day" – 2:51
10. "The Old Guard" – 4:17
11. "Teenage Kennedy Lobotomy" (Hidden track) – 1:06

=== Bonus Tracks ===
- "A Brief Misunderstanding of the Queens and Kings" (Bonus download through SideOneDummy pre-order)
- "Bring Down Their Wall Again" (Bonus download through SideOneDummy pre-order)
- "The Weathermen Know Which Way the Wind Blows" (Bonus on iTunes)
- "Africom" (Bonus on iTunes)

=== Which Side Are You On? E.P. ===
Some releases of the album, including the first pressing of the Australian release, the Amazon.de pack, and versions in the US pre-ordered through Side One Dummy or bought at independent record stores, comes with a bonus disc titled Which Side Are You On? E.P. The tracks on it are:

1. "Bring Down Their Wall Again" – 3:14
2. "The Weathermen Know Which Way the Wind Will Blow" – 2:45
3. "Africom" – 3:35

== Use in popular culture ==
In the episode "Fresh Blood", Season 3 Episode 11, of HBO's True Blood there is a sticker of the artwork for "The People or the Gun" on one of the doors in Fangtasia.

== Personnel ==
Anti-Flag

- Justin Sane – guitar, vocals
- Chris #2 – bass, vocals
- Chris Head – guitar, vocals
- Pat Thetic – drums

Additional personnel

- Additional percussion by Anti-Flag
- Additional vocals on track 3 by Tim McIlrath, Greg Attonito, Wade McNeil and David McWane
- Sixburgh Steel City Gang Vocals: Marc Riot, Tyler Kweder, Jason Cantu, Corey Cameron and Marc Code
- Additional handclapping by Katie Bullers and Anna Schwartz

Production

- Written, recorded and produced by Anti-Flag in Pittsburgh, PA
- Mixed by Mario J. McNulty at Alice's Restaurant
- Mastered by Mass Giorgini at Sonic Iguana
- Project coordinator – Jesse Jones

Art

- Artwork, layout and design by Mike Ski with No More Galleries

== Charts ==
Chart	Peak position
US Billboard 200	122
