= The Terror State =

Studio album by Anti-Flag
- Released: October 21, 2003
- Genre: Hardcore punk; punk rock
- Length: 36:48
- Label: Fat Wreck Chords
- Producer: Tom Morello, Nick DiDia

Anti-Flag chronology
BYO Split Series, Vol. 4 (2002)	The Terror State (2003)	Death of a Nation (2004)

Singles from The Terror State
- 1. "Turncoat" Released: 2003; 2. "Death of a Nation" Released: 2004; 3. "Post-War Breakout" Released: 2004

Professional ratings
Review scores
Source	Rating
AllMusic	4/5 stars
Punknews.org	4.5/5 stars

The Terror State is the fifth studio album by Pittsburgh punk rock band Anti-Flag, released on October 21, 2003, on Fat Wreck Chords. The album's artwork was regarded as somewhat controversial (picturing lead vocalist Justin Sane's niece, Rachel, amongst rubble and holding an automatic handgun), and the band was forced to create an alternate version (which was simply all black with the Terror State logo centered) for sale in some larger chain stores, such as Wal-Mart.

On the inside of the cardboard sleeve surrounding the CD case there is a stencil print of GW Bush with text stating "one term President".

Produced by Tom Morello, The Terror State was hailed as Anti-Flag's most polished album to date. The album made #1 on KTUH's charts on the week of January 19, 2004. As of April 3, 2008, the album had sold 106,000 copies.

== Track listing ==
No.	Title	Length
1.	"Turncoat"	2:10
2.	"Rank-n-File"	3:46
3.	"Post-War Breakout" (Woody Guthrie)	3:11
4.	"Sold as Freedom"	2:16
5.	"Power to the Peaceful"	2:57
6.	"Mind the G.A.T.T."	3:14
7.	"You Can Kill the Protester, But You Can't Kill the Protest"	2:33
8.	"When You Don't Control Your Government People Want to Kill You"	2:47
9.	"Wake Up!"	2:35
10.	"Tearing Down the Borders"	3:07
11.	"Death of a Nation"	1:55
12.	"Operation Iraqi Liberation"	2:21
13.	"One People, One Struggle"	3:01
14.	"Fuck the Flag" (bonus track (Only available on the LP or the first 15,000 pressings of the CD))	0:52

== Personnel ==
- Justin Sane - guitar, lead vocals on tracks 1, 2, 4, 6, 8, 10, 12, 14
- Chris Head - guitar, backing vocals
- Chris #2 - bass guitar, lead vocals on tracks 3, 5, 7, 9, 11, 13, 14
- Pat Thetic - drums

== Charts ==
Chart (2003)	Peak position
US Billboard 200	91
