= Mobilize (Anti-Flag album) =

Studio album by Anti-Flag
- Released: February 19, 2002
- Recorded: September – December 1, 2001
- Genre: Hardcore punk
- Length: 54:21
- Label: A-F
- Producer: Anti-Flag

Anti-Flag chronology
| Underground Network (2001) | Mobilize (2002) | BYO Split Series, Vol. 4 (2002) |

Professional ratings
Review scores
| Source | Rating |
|---|---|
| AllMusic | link |

Mobilize is the fourth studio album by punk rock band Anti-Flag. It contains eight new studio tracks, and eight live songs.

The album's live tracks were recorded at the Mr. Roboto Project, a cooperatively-organized and volunteer-run DIY venue in Wilkinsburg, Pennsylvania (just outside Pittsburgh's city limits).

== Track listing ==
All tracks written by Justin Sane except as noted.

Standard Edition
| No. | Title | Length |
|---|---|---|
| 1. | "911 for Peace" | 3:34 |
| 2. | "Mumia's Song" (Justin Sane, Chris #2) | 2:24 |
| 3. | "What's the Difference?" | 1:59 |
| 4. | "We Want to Be Free" | 1:36 |
| 5. | "N.B.C. (No Blood Thirsty Corporations)" (Justin Sane, Pat Thetic) | 2:12 |
| 6. | "Right to Choose" (Chris #2) | 2:57 |
| 7. | "We Don't Need It!" | 3:12 |
| 8. | "Anatomy of Your Enemy" (Anti-Flag) | 3:02 |

Live Songs

| No. | Title | Length |
|---|---|---|
| 1. | "Underground Network (Live)" | 3:32 |
| 2. | "Tearing Everyone Down (Live)" | 2:44 |
| 3. | "Bring Out Your Dead (Live)" | 3:01 |
| 4. | "A New Kind of Army (Live)" | 3:46 |
| 5. | "Their System Doesn't Work for You (Live)" | 2:25 |
| 6. | "Free Nation (Live)" | 2:56 |
| 7. | "Spaz's House Destruction Party (Live)" | 3:10 |
| 8. | "Die For the Government (Live)" | 3:14 |

(The first pressing contained a bonus compilation disc showcasing A-F records bands from 1998-2002.)

== Personnel ==
- Justin Sane - Guitar & Lead Vocals
- Chris Head - Guitar & Vocals
- Chris #2 - Bass & Lead Vocals
- Pat Thetic - Drums
- Spaz - Vocals on "Spaz's House Destruction Party"; he also appears after "Die For Your Government" with the band where he sings "Coz I Got High" and "Coz Pat Got High"

== Charts ==
| Chart | Peak position |
|---|---|
| US Independent Albums (Billboard) | 42 |
