= Anti-Flag =

American punk rock band (1993–2023)

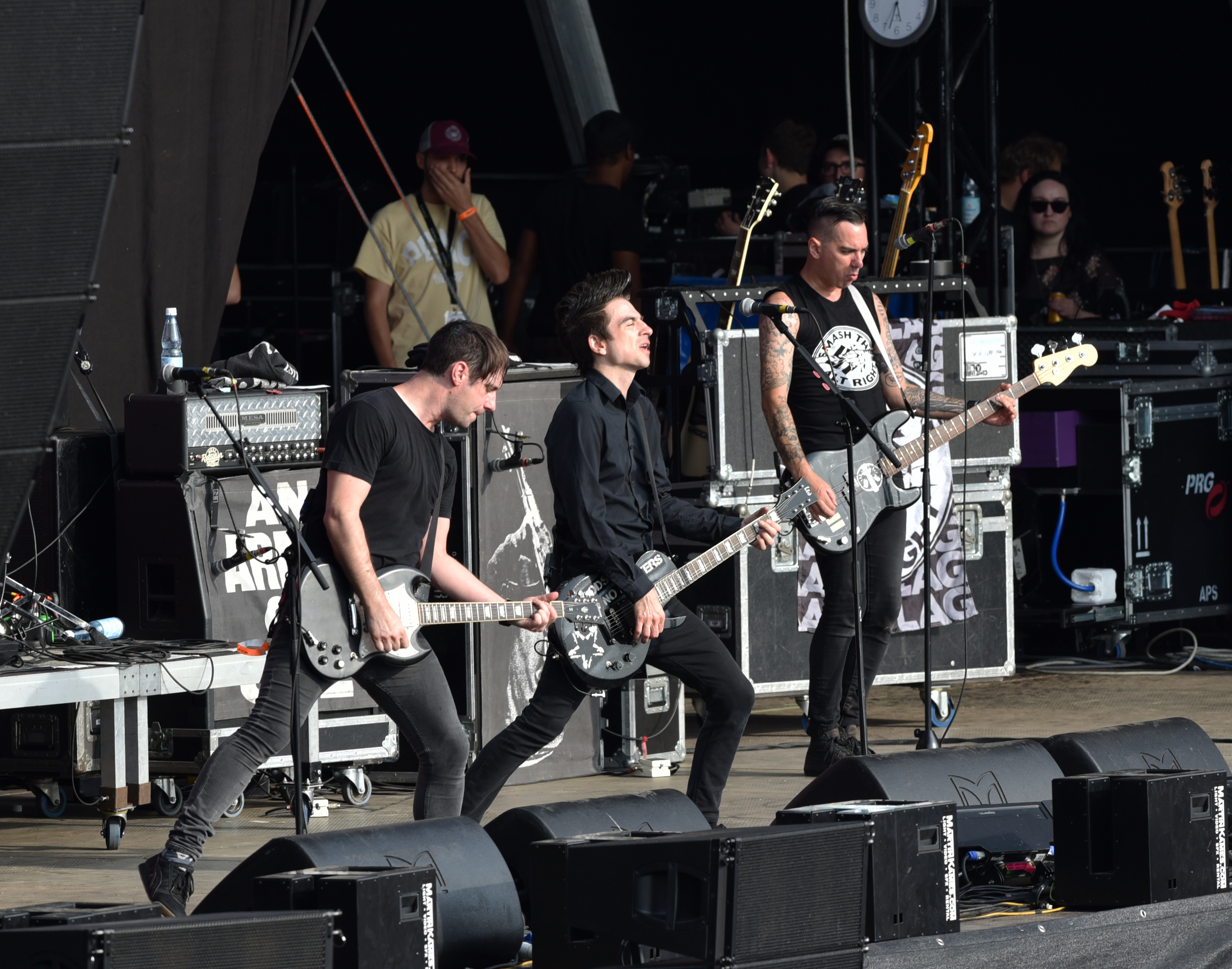
- Anti-Flag in 2017

Background information
- Origin: Pittsburgh, Pennsylvania, United States
- Genres: Anarcho Punk, Punk rock
- Works: Discography
- Years active: 1988–1989; 1992–2023
- Labels: New Red Archives; Go Kart; A-F; Fat Wreck Chords; RCA; SideOneDummy; Spinefarm
- Past members: Justin Sane; Chris No. 2 Chris Head; Pat Thetic; Andy Flag; Lucy Fester; Jamie Cock
- Website: anti-flag.com

Anti-Flag was an American punk rock band formed in Pittsburgh, Pennsylvania, in 1988. The band was known for its left-wing political activism. For the majority of the band's career, their members included Justin Sane (vocals and guitar), Chris Head (guitar), Pat Thetic (drums), and Chris Barker, also known as Chris No. 2 (vocals and bass).

Gaining popularity through the punk underground, Anti-Flag controversially signed to RCA Records and released their major label debut For Blood and Empire in 2006. It contained singles such as "The Press Corpse" (which was the band's only appearance on the US Alternative Airplay chart) and "This is the End (For You My Friend)", which featured in multiple video games.

The band remained active past their commercial peak, releasing a total of thirteen albums, the last of which came out months before their disbandment. The band also operated their own record label, A-F Records.

Anti-Flag suddenly broke up in July 2023 amidst several rape and sexual assault allegations made against Sane. The other members directly condemned him and disbanded.

== History ==
=== Early years (1988, 1992–1996) ===
Anti-Flag was originally formed in 1988 by Justin Sane and Pat Thetic. Various guitarists and bassists joined and left the band during the band's early years, including Sane's sister, Lucy Fester, who was formerly part of the Chicago band Toothpaste. The band failed to solidify and disbanded after performing in just one show. In 1992, Sane and Thetic reformed the band with Andy Flag as their bassist. A 17-song demo album called 17 Songs was released the same year.

=== First three albums (1996–1999) ===
In 1996, Anti-Flag released their first album, Die For the Government, on New Red Archives. Andy Flag left the band in mid-1996 because of personal disputes with Justin Sane. After Andy Flag's departure in 1996, Sean Whelan from the Pittsburgh band the Bad Genes briefly filled in as their bassist. During this time, Whelan was also playing in another band (57 Defective) with Pittsburgh guitarist Chris Head, whom he introduced to Anti-Flag.

In early 1997, Chris Head began filling in on bass. In late 1997, Jamie Cock took over as the new bassist, giving Chris Head his preferred role as the second guitar. The band's lineup was finalized in 1999 when Chris Barker, also known as Chris No. 2, replaced Jamie Cock on bass.

In 1998, Anti-Flag released their second full-length album, Their System Doesn't Work for You. The album contained all nine Anti-Flag songs from the 1996 Anti-Flag/d.b.s. split album North America Sucks, as well as 10 new unreleased songs. The band decided to release the album independently, and Their System Doesn't Work for You became the debut release for the band's own A-F Records.

In 1999, Anti-Flag released the album A New Kind of Army on Go-Kart Records/A-F Records. The album addressed topics such as abortion, political corruption, racism, fascism, troubled youth, police brutality, and unity amongst American youths. The cover art page unfolds into a poster featuring the phrase, "Too smart to fight. Too smart to kill. Join now. A new kind of army." In addition, the band released a disclaimer at the bottom of its album cover, which says, "Anti-Flag does not mean Anti-American. Anti-Flag means anti-war. Anti-Flag means unity."

=== Fat Wreck Chords (2000–2004) ===
In 2000, Anti-Flag was invited to participate in Vans Warped Tour. During this time, the members of Anti-Flag met NOFX's Fat Mike, owner of the Fat Wreck Chords record label. This meeting built a friendship between them that would lead to Anti-Flag releasing two albums under Fat Wreck Chords.

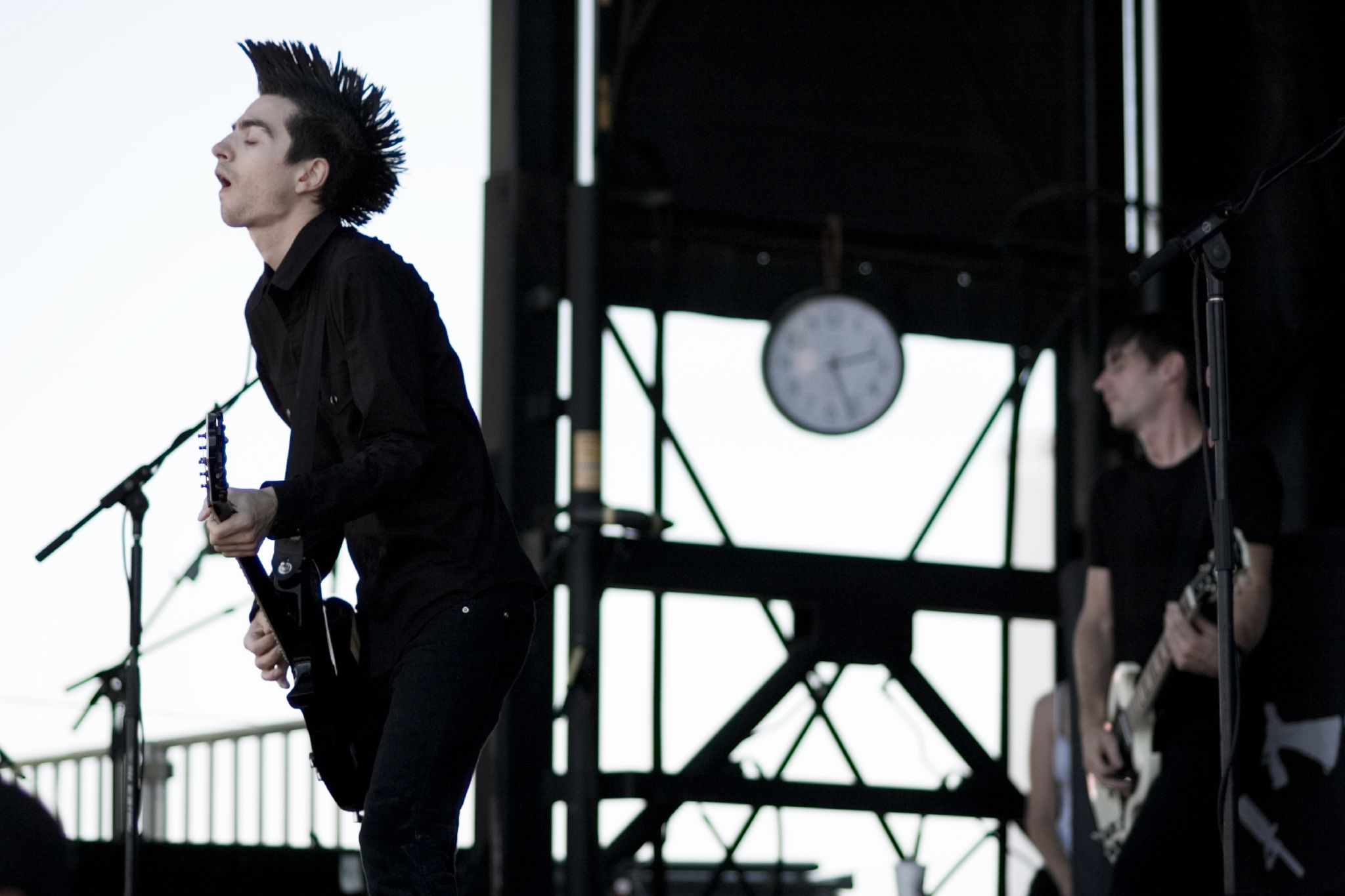
Frontman Justin Sane at Warped Tour 2006

In 2001, Anti-Flag teamed up with punk music producer Mass Giorgini to record the album Underground Network on Fat Wreck Chords. The album addressed the topics of fascism (specifically neo-Nazis infiltrating the "hardcore scene") and the foreign policy of the United States. The album contained a now-commonplace booklet filled with essays from historians and political commentators, most notably Professor Howard Zinn.

In February 2002, Anti-Flag released the album Mobilize on A-F Records. The album featured eight new studio tracks, as well as eight live tracks of songs from other albums. In the wake of the September 11 terrorist attacks on the United States, Anti-Flag spoke out against the push for war with the album's title track, "911 for Peace". During this time, many music stores took Anti-Flag's records off their shelves, as their music was labeled as "anti-American." In 2003, Anti-Flag released the album The Terror State on Fat Wreck Chords, which primarily focused on criticizing the Bush Administration's actions regarding the war on terrorism. As before, a booklet filled with essays by the band and other political commentators was included in the album. The album also contained a song called "Post-War Breakout," with lyrics originally written by Woody Guthrie.

Bassist Chris Barker

On October 8, 2004, U.S. Representative Jim McDermott gave a speech in the House of Representatives, commending Anti-Flag for their work in encouraging young people to register and vote.

=== RCA (2005–2009) ===
In 2005, Anti-Flag signed a two-album record contract with the major label RCA. In an interview with British newspaper The Guardian, Justin Sane explained the band's move to a major label:

We've been approached by the major labels over the past seven or eight years, but we thought we had an impact where we were. They were never willing to give us complete control. This time they were willing to give us complete control over what we record, the artwork, and who we tour with. We won't be censored. If there was ever a time to take a chance to be heard on a mass scale, then this is the time. I feel like we've been a voice in the wilderness for too long.

The first of these two albums, For Blood and Empire, was released on March 21, 2006. The album's main focus is criticism of the U.S. government's mishandling of the war on terrorism. The album's lead single, "This Is The End (For You My Friend)," is featured in the video game Madden NFL 07 and NHL 07. This single strays from the theme of war and instead focuses on troubled youth. They finished their "War Sucks, Let's Party" United States headlining tour in April and worked on some side projects such as the African Well Fund and Start to Finish MS Now.

Throughout Anti-Flag's career, numerous other bands have been added to the roster of the band's own label, A-F Records. These bands include The Code, Pipedown, Much the Same, The Vacancy, The Unseen, Modey Lemon, Thought Riot, Tabula Rasa, and many others.

On November 25, Anti-Flag revealed that their latest album was called The Bright Lights of America. The album was produced by Tony Visconti and was released on April 1, 2008. The album's title single was released exclusively on iTunes on February 12, 2008. A video of the song was released some weeks later.

In 2008, while on tour with Canadian band Billy Talent in Europe, Justin Sane and Chris No. 2 joined Billy Talent singer Ben Kowalewicz and guitarist Ian D'Sa, singing their new song "Turn Your Back" from their upcoming unreleased album. The two also play on the single version of the song.

In March 2009, Anti-Flag was forced to cancel a series of tours after Sane broke his collarbone at the UEA LCR in Norwich by jumping off the stage, trying to stop someone that was throwing objects at the band.

=== SideOneDummy (2009–2014) ===
On September 30, 2008, Chris No. 2 started posting on his blog that the band had begun to work on their seventh studio album. On December 2, Anti-Flag began recording the album, starting with "The Economy is Suffering... Let It Die".

On March 31, 2009, Anti-Flag announced that their next CD, The People or the Gun, would be released on SideOneDummy on June 9, 2009. The band recorded the album in a home studio they built themselves. The first track of the album "Sodom, Gomorrah, and Washington DC (Sheep in Shepherd's Clothing)" could be listened to on Anti-Flag's website. On May 1, 2009, the band performed a full set of The Clash covers at Hoodwink in East Rutherford, New Jersey.

In September 2009, Anti-Flag planned to play a show during a G-20 protest that was taking place in their hometown. However, the show was cancelled by the promoter due to severe parking restrictions and police presence near the venue. Even so, the band continued to personally take part in the protests.

In November 2009, Anti-Flag showed their support to the protesting students in Vienna, Austria by giving a speech at the main building of the University of Vienna. They also had one of the student representatives speak at their two shows in Vienna.

In January 2010, Anti-Flag completed a full US tour supported by Aiden and Cancer Bats, with various bands filling another supporting slot and local bands opening as many of the shows as possible. The tour was sponsored by Amnesty International, peta2, Greenpeace, and Innes Clothing. The band followed the US tour with an Australian tour, playing the Soundwave Festival dates in February 2010, with bands such as AFI, Paramore, Escape the Fate, A Day to Remember, and HIM. They also played two headlining dates supported by Alexisonfire and Comeback Kid.

Throughout mid-2010, Anti-Flag played in various festivals such as Ruisrock and Woodstock en Beauce. They also played the last few dates of the Vans Warped Tour. In September 2010, the band headlined a Canadian tour with support from the Menzingers. This tour was followed by the European Vans Off the Wall Music Tour in October, with supporting acts by The Swellers and Pulled Apart by Horses.

In March–April 2011, Anti-flag made a live comeback by headlining a South American tour with This Is a Standoff, and supporting My Chemical Romance in the U.S. In May–June 2011, the band returned to Europe to play in the Slam Dunk Festival, and play supporting System of a Down in Milan, Italy.

On June 21, 2011, Justin Sane announced that Anti-Flag was working on material for a new album, which was planned to be released later in the year. The album had the working title of Magnum. Sane also announced plans to record a new solo album in the future, as he had also been working on some folk-oriented solo material.

On March 20, 2012, Anti-Flag released an album called The General Strike, which was recorded and produced by the band at their home studio. The band also intended to go on The General Strike Record Release Tour with The Flatliners and the Have Nots. They released a lyric video for the song "1915" which talked about Joe Hill.

In June 2014, Anti-Flag announced that they were going to release a new album called A Document of Dissent: 1993-2013. The album was a compilation of their releases from 1993 to 2013, and was planned to be released on Fat Wreck Chords, which was the band's first release with the label since The Terror State in 2003. The album was released on July 21, 2014.

=== Spinefarm and Beyond Barricades documentary (2015–2023) ===
On January 16, 2015, Anti-Flag announced they would release their ninth studio album called American Spring on the label Spinefarm Records. The album was released on May 26, 2015. Later in the year, Anti-Flag released a compilation album called Cease Fires which contains two previously unreleased songs from their American Spring recording sessions and twelve songs from their 20 Years of Hell EP series. It was released on December 18, 2015. In an interview in 2016, Chris No. 2 revealed that he doesn't read books. On August 14, 2017, in reaction to the events of the 2017 Unite the Right rally, the band released a song titled "Racists" to the Spinefarm Records YouTube channel. On August 18, 2017, the band announced that a new album titled American Fall would be released on Spinefarm Records on November 3, 2017, by premiering a song from the album titled "American Attraction" on Anti-Flag's YouTube channel.

In early 2018, Anti-Flag toured with Stray from the Path, The White Noise and Sharptooth.

From July until September 2018, Anti-Flag played with AFI and Rise Against in the Mourning in Amerika Tour.

On October 4, 2019, Anti-Flag released their song "Christian Nationalist" alongside an announcement of a European tour the following year. On the band's website, the song's meaning was explained by a quote from Sane:

History is full of wealthy and powerful people using religion and cultism to justify policies of oppression and inequality. Invariably, these policies target the most vulnerable in society so that elites can maintain their dominance. Today we see this same strategy employed by right-wing politicians all over the world. Just as the anti-fascists of the 1930s and 1940s rejected the fascist ideologies of their era, we reject the neo-fascists of this era. Theocracy is dangerous and inherently anti-democratic because it restricts individual choice and provides an avenue by which politicians can claim a moral superiority over "the other". It gives political cover and justification for policies and actions which might otherwise be deemed morally objectionable, inhuman, or adverse to the best interest of the country.

The website also provided a list of Republican politicians, along with sources indicating that the politicians had accepted large donations from the National Rifle Association of America (NRA) and other gun lobbyists for the politician's support for certain policies and actions, along with a list of mass shooting incidents.

Later that same month, Anti-Flag announced their twelfth studio album, 20/20 Vision, alongside the release of the song "Hate Conquers All" and the song's music video. Additional songs "Unbreakable" and "The Disease" were also released ahead of the album, which released on January 17, 2020. Many of the songs on the album directly discuss the band's opposition of former president, Donald Trump. In the past, the band has avoided directly naming presidents. Sane revealed that this was done because the band believed that “Donald Trump IS the problem, so we have to go directly at the problem. You could say he’s a symptom of a larger problem and I believe that’s true, but he IS the symptom." In support of the album, Anti-Flag embarked on a world tour with dates throughout 2020. However, many of these dates were delayed to 2021 due to the COVID-19 pandemic. Before the tour resumed, a digital-only deluxe version of the album was released under the new name, 20/20 Division.

That same year, a documentary released called Beyond Barricades: The Story of Anti-Flag. The documentary chronicles the band over their years of touring, writing music, and activism, and features interviews from other musicians from bands such as Rage Against The Machine, Rise Against, Bad Religion, and The Menzingers.

With the pandemic putting the band's touring on hold for a long period of time, Anti-Flag was able to spend much more time than usual writing new music. Upon finishing touring for 20/20 Vision, Anti-Flag returned to the studio to record their next album. The band took a different approach than usual during recording by not only writing a concept album, but bringing in guest musicians for multiple tracks. The band officially announced their final album Lies They Tell Our Children on July 29, 2022, alongside the release of the single "Laugh. Cry. Smile. Die." featuring Silverstein vocalist Shane Told. A music video was also released for the song, which depicts an individual spray painting the walls of an abandoned school with various messages that the band deemed as lies. The album was released on January 6, 2023, coinciding with the second anniversary of the Capitol attack.

=== Breakup (2023) ===
On July 19, 2023, the band posted an update on their Patreon announcing their disbandment and the intention to refund fans who were subscribed. Following this announcement, their website was taken down, and the band's social media accounts were deleted. The band was on tour in Europe at the time of their disbandment, due to support Dropkick Murphys at a show in Prague on July 21; the band also planned to tour in North America alongside The Bouncing Souls in fall 2023. When asked to offer a statement regarding the breakup, the band's publicist declined to comment. Stereogum and Us Weekly linked Anti-Flag's July 2023 breakup to a podcast episode released on July 19, the same day as the band's dissolution, that leveled possible accusations of sexual assault against "a singer in a political punk band" believed to be frontman Justin Sane.

On July 26, Sane released a statement through his personal Instagram account denying the accusations and calling them "categorically false"; in his statement, Sane also explained the length of time before he made a statement, stating that he needed time to "absorb the initial shock." Meanwhile, Thetic, Head, and Barker released a statement expressing their shock and sadness upon hearing the allegations, starting with, "A core tenet of the band Anti-Flag is to listen to and believe all survivors of sexual violence and abuse. The recent allegations about Justin are in direct contradiction to that tenet. Therefore, we felt the only immediate option was to disband." Their statement ended with, "It was a privilege for us to be in the band Anti-Flag. As we seek to find our path forward we wish healing to all survivors." Following an exposé published by Rolling Stone in September – revealing twelve additional women and girls who accused Sane of sexual misconduct, "serious sexual assaults", grooming and rape – Thetic, Head, and Barker released a second statement directly condemning Sane, stating they believed he was "in need of serious professional help" and that "it appears you used our beliefs as a cover for egregious activities that you clearly knew we would never condone."

In November 2023, the original accuser from the July podcast episode sued Sane for sexual assault under the New York Adult Survivors Act. In an amendment to her initial complaint in March 2024, the accuser questioned the rest of the band members' insistence that they were unaware of Sane's actions, accusing Thetic, Head, and Barker of being "aware of [Sane]'s practice of sexually assaulting young women and girls," and claiming that the band's self-owned distribution company, Hardwork Distribution, "aided and abetted such behavior." The accuser also stated that "the band was approached about [Sane]'s predatory behavior at least 25 years ago and did nothing to stop him. They chose their business prospects over the welfare of their fans. For decades, these men financially and socially benefited from [Sane]'s predation while pretending not to see it." The accuser also claimed the band unsuccessfully attempted to "coax [her] forgiveness through a restorative justice process". At least three of the girls and women who spoke to Rolling Stone for the September 2023 exposé also claimed that Thetic, Head, and Barker were present when Sane brought teenage girls and young women backstage and on the band's tour bus. In March 2024, the accuser's legal team stated that they believed Sane had approximately 60 victims and that one witness who came forward and had their testimony included in the accuser's lawsuit claimed that at a 2002 album release party in Pittsburgh, they witnessed "the members of Anti-Flag [mingling] outside the venue with clearly underage girls" who appeared "to be between 14 and 15 years old," and that Sane and other band members were "hugging and inappropriately kissing them."

Within days of Anti-Flag's breakup, several bands announced their departure from the band's record label A-F Records, including Celebration Summer, Darien Gap, Hanalei, Reconciler, Sammy Kay, and Wolves & Wolves & Wolves & Wolves. The band American Television also announced they would find another way to distribute their upcoming album without the aid of Anti-Flag or the band's record label. In September 2023, members of Anti-Flag informed that they were "in the process of unwinding the label, including returning master rights and physical records/merchandise to the bands," although they stated this would "take some time to complete properly."

== Name and criticism ==
Anti-Flag explained the band name on the artwork for their 1999 release A New Kind of Army, saying, "Anti-Flag does not mean Anti-American. Anti-Flag means anti-war. Anti-Flag means the common people of the world are better off living in unity and peace. Anti-Flag means to stand against corporate greed that hurts millions while benefiting a handful of extremely rich. Anti-Flag means to fight against mindless nationalism. Anti-Flag means unity."

Anti-Flag's anti-capitalism stance drew criticism towards them when they started working with RCA Records in 2005, with some saying that the band was selling out. Anti-Flag defended themselves against the criticism by saying that the purpose of signing to the record label was to bring their message to more people.

== Studio projects ==
Chris No. 2 and Chris Head work together in another band called White Wives. They released the Situationists EP on February 15, 2011, and the album Happeners on June 28, 2011. The band and its name were based on the Provo movement and The White Plans.

Wharf Rats, a musical partnership between Chris No. 2, Wade MacNeil, and P.O.S, was created on Warped Tour and recorded in the festival's traveling recording studio. They created two songs together, namely "Oh No!" and "Capital Gains". The two songs were pressed on a limited edition 7-inch single and released on May 31 on No Sleep Records.

== ANTIfest ==
ANTIfest was Anti-Flag's own hosted festival. It originally took place on May 3, 2012, at The Forum at the University of Hertfordshire. ANTIfest was the first self-established festival hosted by the band, who wanted to make it an annual event. The band personally selected all of the bands that appeared, including other punk bands such as The Bouncing Souls, The Menzingers, Red City Radio, The Computers, and The Skints. Volunteers from certain organizations also took part in the festival, including people from Amnesty International, PETA, and Emmaus.

ANTIFest also took place on July 14, 2013, at Backstage Werk in Munich with support from ZSK, Strike Anywhere, The Computers, and Apologies, I Have None.

== Activism ==
Anti-Flag was involved with political activism throughout their musical career. They created many activism groups, which include The Underground Action Alliance, Military Free Zone (created to protest a clause in the No Child Left Behind Act, which gave military recruiters access to students' personal information), and The Bright Lights.

All members of Anti-Flag were vegan, and were adamant supporters of animal rights. They were frequently featured by PETA, and also appeared on the Fat Wreck Chords compilation album Liberation: Songs to Benefit PETA.

The band performed at multiple protests, including two in support of Rage Against the Machine.

They performed outside the Republican National Convention in 2008. Anti-Flag wasn't supposed to be the last band to perform at the event, but officials found out that Rage Against the Machine was going to perform after them, so they shut down the stage's power and Rage Against the Machine performed two songs using megaphones instead.

Anti-Flag played an acoustic set at the Occupy Wall Street protest in New York City on October 8, 2011.

They regularly supported organizations which include:

- Democracy Now!, whose headlines they showcase on the band's homepage.
- PETA, who was one of the sponsors of their 2010 'The Economy Sucks Let's Party' tour.
- Amnesty International, who was one of the sponsors of their 2010 'The Economy Sucks Let's Party' tour. Anti-Flag once donated money to them from the sales of The People and the Gun.
- Greenpeace, who was one of the sponsors of their 'The Economy Sucks Let's Party' tour. Anti-Flag once collaborated with them to persuade world leaders to attend the climate conference in Copenhagen.
- Useless, who they collaborated with by selling screen-printed limited-edition T-shirts to raise money for The Kandorwahun project, and by spreading awareness of the organization.

Anti-Flag showed their disapproval of fracking in October 2013, supporting the Clean Water Mob.

Anti-Flag's song "Die for Your Government" was sung by anti-war protesters who briefly barricaded a road to prevent U.S. troops from deploying to Iraq in August 2010.

They appeared in the 2010 Sounds Like A Revolution, a documentary on new protest music in the United States.

In 2021, Anti-Flag was among the hundreds of signatories of the "Musicians for Palestine" open letter, urging a ceasefire.

== Symbol ==
Anti-Flag's logo is the "Gun Star", which was designed by Chris Head. It was first used on the cover of the album Mobilize. It was later used on the band's merchandise. The logo is made up of five broken M16 rifles in the shape of a star. The band often used the O & X superposed symbols on the Die for the Government LP.

== Band members ==
=== Final line-up ===
- Justin Sane – lead vocals, lead guitar (1988–1989, 1992–2023)
- Pat Thetic – drums (1988–1989, 1992–2023)
- Chris Head – rhythm guitar, backing vocals (1997–2023), bass (1997)
- Chris "No. 2" Barker – bass, co-lead vocals (1999–2023)

=== Former ===
- Lucy Fester – bass (1988–1989)
- Andy Flag – bass, lead and backing vocals (1993–1996)
- Jamie "Cock" Towns – bass (1997–1999)

=== Touring ===
- Brian Curran (1997)
- Sean Whealen (1998)
- Steve LaRussa – drums, backing vocals (2013–2017)
- Josh Massie – rhythm guitar (2019)
- Donny Donovan – rhythm guitar (2019)
- Erik Pitluga – drums (2018–2023), rhythm guitar (2020–2023)

== Discography ==
Studio albums

- Die for the Government (1996)
- A New Kind of Army (1999)
- Underground Network (2001)
- Mobilize (2002)
- The Terror State (2003)
- For Blood and Empire (2006)
- The Bright Lights of America (2008)
- The People or the Gun (2009)
- The General Strike (2012)
- American Spring (2015)
- American Fall (2017)
- 20/20 Vision (2020)
- Lies They Tell Our Children (2023)
