= Squatta's Paradise =

EP by Choking Victim
- Released: 1996
- Recorded: April 1996
- Genre: Hardcore punk, ska punk, crust punk, anarcho-punk
- Length: 11:56

Squatta's Paradise is the second extended play released by the American ska punk/anarcho punk band Choking Victim. The E.P. was recorded in April, 1996 and released later that same year.

"Squatta's Paradise" was later released in CD format in 2000, along with "Crack Rock Steady" as the "Crack Rock Steady/Squatta's Paradise" compilation. The title is a reference to the song Gangsta's Paradise by American rapper Coolio.

== Track listing ==
1. "Infested: Lindane Conspiracy, Pt.1" - 2:46
2. "Death Song" - 2:33
3. "Born To Die" - 3:27
4. "Suicide (A Better Way)" - 3:10

== Personnel ==
- Musicians:
  - Stza - vocals and guitar
  - Alec Baillie - bass
  - Skwert - drums and vocals
- Eric Drooker (Artwork)
- Popeye (Artwork)
- Brian K Trash (Artwork)
- Skwert (Artwork)
- Stza (Artwork)
- Shayne Pezent (Artwork)

The song "Suicide" would later be rerecorded by the band and included on their debut (and only) album, "No Gods, No Managers".

The songs "Born To Die" and "Infested" were later recorded by Leftöver Crack, and included on "Mediocre Generica" and the "Fuck World Trade Demo" respectively.
