= Stza =

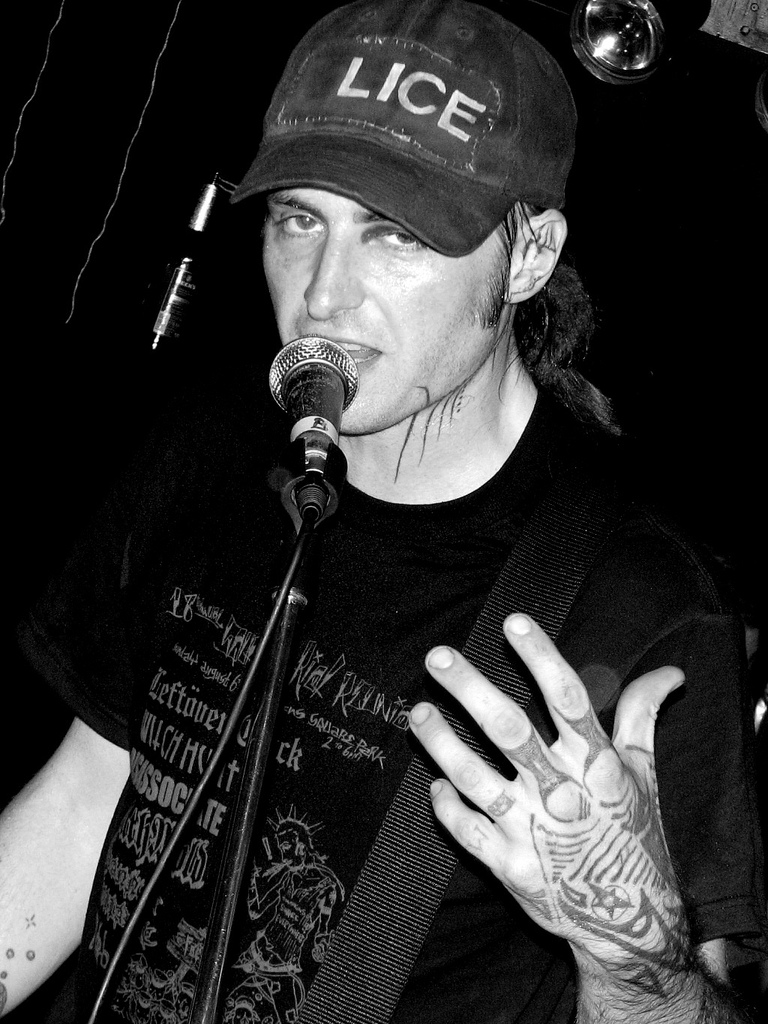
- Stza with Leftover Crack in Cologne in 2006

Background information
- Also known as: Stza Crack; Osama Stiz Laden; Ol' Dirty Stza; Crack Daddy Kane; Sturg; Stza Fucking Hipster; Sturgeon F. Hipster
- Born: Scott Sturgeon; March 4, 1976 (age 50)
- Genres: Hardcore punk; ska punk; crust punk; anarcho punk
- Occupations: Musician, singer, songwriter
- Instruments: Guitar, vocals, harmonica, keyboard
- Years active: 1989–present

Scott Sturgeon, also known as Stza Crack or simply Stza (/ˈstɪzə/ STIZ-ə; born March 4, 1976), is an American musician and artist who has fronted several ska-punk bands in the New York City area, the best-known being Choking Victim and Leftöver Crack. The stage name Stza is a tribute to the Wu-Tang Clan, members of which would take their stage names from the Supreme Alphabet of the Five-Percent Nation, such as GZA (God ZigZagZig Allah) and RZA (Ruler ZigZagZig Allah) - Stza's name would therefore be Self Truth ZigZagZig Allah.

== Early life ==
Stza was raised in New York by his mother, whom he classified as an "over-protective Jewish mom". He rarely saw his biological father, and his stepfather died by suicide. As a teenager, he dropped out of high school, ran away from home, and began riding freight trains. During this time, he began using heroin and crack cocaine. He later described drugs as a positive influence in his life and said that he would have killed himself during this time if not for drugs because he was "very lonely and suicidal."

== Music career ==
In 1990, Stza and a friend of his, Alec Baillie, formed No Commercial Value, which later evolved into Choking Victim and then again into Leftöver Crack. Although many members of these bands have come and gone, Stza remained a constant figure, writing the vast majority of the lyrics and music and becoming the bands' self-appointed spokesperson. Stza is also associated with the band Morning Glory through Leftöver Crack member, Ezra Kire. In 2005, he collaborated with Mischief Brew on a song for his first album, Smash The Windows.

In 2005, he played solo (doing acoustic shows) and in a new band, Crack Rock Steady Seven, featuring members of The Infested in Europe. 2006 saw him in Mexico City forming another regional Crack Rocksteady Seven, the CRS7mx featuring members of Niño Zombi. In the fall of 2006, he returned to the United States and toured with Leftöver Crack, their tour with Citizen Fish was dubbed Cracktoberfest 2006. Most recently Stza has been involved in the creation of another punk/ska band, this time with members of Casa de Chihuahua, The Slackers, and The Degenerics (Nico do Gaillo, Ara Babajian, and Frank Piegaro respectively) called "Star Fucking Hipsters". Star Fucking Hipsters' debut album was released on 30 September 2008 on the Fat Wreck Chords label. Their second album, "Never Rest In Peace", was released on 20 October 2009 on the Alternative Tentacles label. Their third album, titled "From the Dumpster to the Grave" was released on 11 October 2011 on Fat Wreck Chords during a record release show at Europa in Brooklyn, New York.

== Personal life ==
Stza, along with other members of Leftöver Crack, has at times resided at 155 Avenue C, better known as C-Squat. He identifies as an atheist Jew.

In 2008, Stza, who has tattoos on his fingers reading "KILL COPS," was arrested for throwing donuts at New York Police Department officers during a show near Tompkins Square Park.

== Discography ==
=== Albums ===
==== With Choking Victim ====
- No Gods, No Managers (1999)

==== With Leftover Crack ====
- Mediocre Generica (2001)
- Fuck World Trade (2004)
- Constructs of the State (2015)
- Leftöver Leftöver Crack (2018)

==== With Star Fucking Hipsters ====
- Until We're Dead (2008)
- Never Rest in Peace (2009)
- From the Dumpster to the Grave (2011)

=== EPs ===
==== With Leftöver Crack ====
- Rock the 40 Oz. (2000)
- Shoot the Kids at School (2000)
- Rock the 40 Oz: Reloaded (2004)

=== Singles ===
==== With Leftöver Crack ====
- Shootacide (2024)
- White Guilt Atrocity Quilt (2025)

=== Splits ===
- Baby Jesus Sliced Up in the Manger (as the Crack Rock Steady 7, with F-Minus), (2001, HellBent)
- Deadline (with Citizen Fish) (2007, Fat Wreck)

=== Compilations ===
- Give 'Em the Boot, ( Infested) Hellcat Records, 1997.
- Give 'Em the Boot II, (Crack City Rockers[Demo]) Hellcat Records, 1999.
- Punk Rawk Explosion 6, (Nazi White Trash), ?, 2003.
- Give 'Em the Boot III, (Atheist Anthem) Hellcat Records, 2002.
- Go Kart vs. the Corporate Giant Vol. 3, (Rock The 40oz) Go Kart Records, 2002.
- 2003 Sampler, (So Ya Wanna Be A Cop) A-F Records, 2003.
- Fueling the Flames of Revolution Vol. 3, (One Dead Cop) A-F Records, 2003.
- Against Police Injustice,(Operation:MOVE, Super Tuesday[Demo]) Non Commercial, 2003.
- Mass Destruction, (Muppet N.A.M.B.L.A) BANKSHOT! Records, 2003.
- Riot Ska, (Drug Song, Nobody Is Free) Beer Records, 2004.
- The Kids Are Gonna Pay (Look Who's Talking Now) with F-Minus, Morning Glory & Bent Outta Shape, Blacknoise Records, 2006.
- Sexy Babies Across the Wasteland (Guest Vocals with Last False Hope) – 2012, Sexy Baby Records.

=== Featured on ===
- Just Like Me by CHEWIE (2013)
- The Abliss by Days n Daze (2017)
- Turtle's Plan by Henry Thugsworth & The Severinator (2025)

=== Live ===
- Live C-Squat 3/31/01 (2001)
- Straight Outta' Naples (2002)
- live at the stage @ Arnhem, Holland (2008)

=== Bootlegs ===
- Fuck World Trade (demo) (2004)

=== Film ===
- Loren Cass (2007)
