= The Inciders =

The InCiders
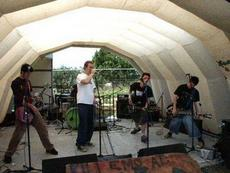
- The InCiders in 2004 (left to right: Kevin Goodwin, Matt Fox, Nick Spencer, Alf Young)

Background information
- Also known as: The I to tha C
- Origin: Bournemouth, England
- Genres: Hardcore punk, heavy metal
- Years active: 2003–present
- Members: Matt Fox; Kevin Goodwin; Alf Young; Nick Spencer; Chris Mackonochie
- Past members: Luke Arnold; Mike Osment; Matt Dixon; John Townes
- Website: theinciders.com

The InCiders (a.k.a. "The I to tha C"), are an English hardcore punk/metal band, based in Bournemouth. The band formed in 2003 and are well known locally for their lively stage shows (referred to as 'parties'), catchy punk rock rants and drunken party mascot, "Ciderman".

Although still relatively unknown on the national punk scene, they have a strong local following and a hard-working reputation.

== History ==
=== Earlyyears (2003–2006) ===
The InCiders logo

From 2003 to 2006, the band were frequently seen smashing up smaller venues on the south coast of England, with the occasional adventure in other UK cities, including Wolverhampton in 2003.

Since the band's inception they have shared stages with US Bombs, Ignite, The Business, Five Knuckle and Crack Rocky Steady Seven (members of Leftöver Crack).

Remembered during the era for their drunken stage antics, some members of the band occasionally found the balance of consuming a sufficient level of alcohol to fuel their show and not over-indulging, so as not to adversely affect their performance, a challenge. In a couple of instances, this resulted in their sound being cut mid-set, seemingly to their amusement.

In 2003 and 2004, the band put on their own events under the name 'Fernstock' to sell-out crowds of 250+. Festival appearances include Jamfest (2003, 2005, 2006) and the first Endorse It In Dorset festival in 2004.

=== Split (2006–2010) ===
Despite being ready to record their first album, the band stopped playing together in 2006. The reason for the split was never officially confirmed, however rumours quickly spread regarding guitarist Kevin Goodwin's affirmation under the Jewish faith, resulting in a conflict of religious beliefs and band ethics. The split was however probably more likely the outcome of the closure of many small south coastal music venues (including Bournemouth's "Mr Smith's"), together with the troubles of an ever-changing drumming line-up.

=== Reformation (2010–present) ===
The band reformed in early 2010 with new drum machine and long-time friend, Chris Mackonochie (of None The Wiser and Henry's Phonograph) and a reborn enthusiasm. The band showcased their comeback gig on 5 June 2010 in their hometown of Bournemouth.

The band's latest release, entitled MegaKill v.2 Turbo, was released on 14 May 2011 with downloadable versions made available and via the band's new website launched the same day. The band hosted a celebratory release party at which they performed their new material, together with classics from their back-catalogue.

In an interview with online magazine Volume Distortion (29 May 2011), the band promised of "plenty more of the ruckus and drunken stage shenanigans" to come and have said they are "already working on new material."

The band's played at Champions in Bournemouth with New York punk band The Casualties on 26 July 2011.

== Musical style ==
The band mixes fast punk chords, metal riffs and political lyrics, often centered on the theme of war. The band have however admitted trying to digress from war and self-confessed "pseudo-politics", preferring now discuss themes closer to the bands heart, such as the Vulcan Bomber, drinking to excess, Godzilla, their favourite comic book TV character Frank Gorshin and 'scene elitism', which they claim nearly caused the demise of the local scene and subsequently the band itself.

The band claim to take inspiration from an array of musical styles. More apparent influences include Sick of It All, Good Riddance, Anti-Flag, Death By Stereo, Municipal Waste and F-Minus.

== Personnel ==
=== Current ===
- Matt Fox: vocals
- Kevin Goodwin: guitar
- Alf Young: guitar
- Nick Spencer: bass
- Chris Mackonochie: drums
- Ciderman

=== Former ===
- Luke Arnold: drums
- Mike Osment: drums (Life in Film)
- Matt Dixon: drums (Chaos Bomb)
- John Townes: drums

== Discography ==
- The Demo EP (2003) [EP]
- Operation: Mayhem! (2004) [EP]
- MegaKill v.2 Turbo! (2011) [LP]
