= Brad Logan =

American punk rock guitarist

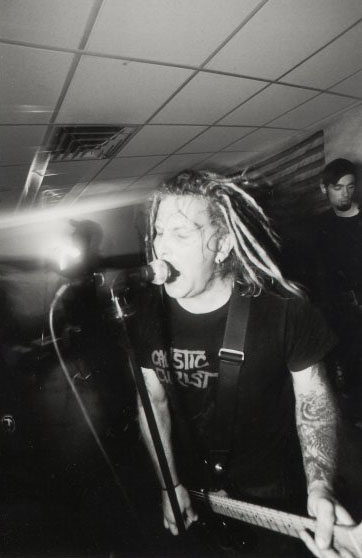
- Logan in August 2004

Background information
- Also known as: Brad Minus
- Origin: Los Angeles, California, U.S.
- Genres: Punk rock; hardcore punk; experimental rock
- Occupations: Musician, Writer, Producer
- Instruments: Guitar; bass; drums; vocals

Brad Logan, sometimes called Brad Minus, is an American punk rock guitarist from Los Angeles, California, who also owns and operates Blacknoise Recordings, and has collaborated on projects with Alternative Tentacles. Logan was the frontman and guitarist for hardcore punk band F-Minus but is most famous for his work in the group Leftöver Crack. In 2018, Logan joined Adolescents following the death of their founding bassist Steve Soto.

"Brad Logan" is also the title of a song written about him by Rancid. It is featured on the "Chef Aid" episode of the TV show South Park, as well as on the album Chef Aid: The South Park Album.

Logan has been a roadie for many bands, including Rancid, Social Distortion, Alkaline Trio, NOFX, Chris Robinson of The Black Crowes, Flogging Molly, and Dance Hall Crashers. He has played in numerous underground punk, and experimental bands, including guitar and bass for seminal punk singer Rik L Rik (in his solo band, and in Garbage Hearts). He has also been a substitute touring guitarist for The Unseen, and for electro/anarcho punk band Intro5pect. Logan currently plays in Instant Ruin with Gabba from Chaos UK.

== Discography ==
=== The Crowd ===
Guitar and vocals

- "Go to the Dentist"- song (1996)
- Skad- 7" (1997)

=== Agnostic Front ===
- Something's Gotta Give- CD, LP (1998) – guitar on "Bloodsucker"

=== F-Minus ===
Guitar and vocals:

- Give 'Em the Boot Vol. 1- CD (1998) – track "No Time"
- Give 'Em the Boot Vol. 2- CD (1999) – track "Forget Yourself"
- Give 'Em the Boot Vol. 3- CD (2002) – track "Suburban Blight"
- Give 'Em the Boot Vol. 4- CD (2004) – track "Caught In Between"
- Failed Society- 7" (1998)
- Won't Bleed Me- 7" (1998)
- F-Minus S/T- CD, LP (1999)
- Suburban Blight- CD (2001)
- Split With Crack Rock Steady 7 - "Baby Jesus Sliced Up In The Manger"- CD, 10" (2001)
- Wake Up Screaming- CD, LP (2003)
- Sweating Blood- CD, 7" (2003)

=== Choking Victim ===
Backing vocals

- No Gods, No Managers- CD, Cass, LP (1999)

=== Leftöver Crack ===
Guitar and vocals:

- Mediocre Generica- CD, LP(2001) – Lead guitar track "The Good, The Bad, and The Leftover Crack"
- Fuck World Trade- CD, LP (2004)
- Deadline- CD, LP Leftöver Crack/Citizen Fish split (2006)
- Constructs of the State- CD, LP (2015)

=== Rats in the Wall ===
Guitar and vocals

- S/T Cassette Limited 100 press (2013)
- Dead End- CD (2013)
- Warbound- CD, Cass, 7" (2014)
- Discography- CD (2014)

=== Adolescents ===
Bass and backing vocals

- Russian Spider Dump- CD, LP (2020)
- Caesar Salad Days- CD, LP (2023)

=== Instant Ruin ===
Vocals, guitar, bass

- Hardcore New Wave- 7", Bandcamp (2022)
