= From the Dumpster to the Grave =

Studio album by Star Fucking Hipsters
- Released: October 11, 2011
- Recorded: 2011
- Genre: ska-punk, anarcho-punk
- Label: Fat Wreck Chords
- Producer: Sturgeon F. Hipster

Star Fucking Hipsters chronology
Never Rest in Peace (2009)	From the Dumpster to the Grave (2011)

From the Dumpster to the Grave is the third and final studio album by ska-punk/anarcho-punk band Star Fucking Hipsters. It was released in 2011 on Fat Wreck Chords.

== Background ==
From The Dumpster to The Grave is the first album to introduce Kelsey "Kill-C" as the back-up female singer, since the departure of Nico de Gaillo. Nico's vocal parts were recorded before she left the band so they are used in some songs. The album contains guest appearances from artists such as Boots Riley from the Political Hip hop group The Coup. Former bassist Yula Beeri, who appeared on the band's first album Until We're Dead (and is also a member of Nanuchka and The World/Inferno Friendship Society) appears on the record as a guest singer.

Lyrics vary from anti-capitalism messages, personal issues, police brutality and activism. Musical styles vary from style to style, like their previous albums, blending together punk, metal, hip hop, ska and folk.

== Track listing ==
1. "Intro" 0:29
2. "Dumpster To the Grave" 2:17
3. "War Widows Vietnam" 2:53
4. "Death Is Never Out of Fashion" 2:41
5. "The Broken Branches" 3:05
6. "The Spoils of War" 0:34
7. "¡Otra Vez!" (feat. Blackbird Raum) 2:33
8. "Honey, I Shrunk the Cops!" 2:09
9. "9/11 'til Infinity" (feat. Boots Riley) 2:56
10. "Ana Ng" (They Might Be Giants cover) 2:21
11. "Rapture, Rinse, Repeat" (Feat. S.F.H. east bay) 2:17
12. "Drowning Out Another Year" 3:53
13. "Outro" 1:29

== Album credits ==
- Scott "Stza Crack" Sturgeon: Vocals, Occasional Guitar
- Frank Piegaro: Guitar
- Chris Pothier: Bass
- Mikey Erg: Drums
- Nico de Gaillo: Vocals
- Kelsey "Kill-C": Vocals
- Yula Beeri: Lead Vocals on "Ana Ng"
- Boots Riley: Rap Vocals on "9/11' til Infinity"
- Scotty "Karate" Heath - drums on "Rapture, Rinse, Repeat"
- Dave Ed - bass on "Rapture, Rinse, Repeat"
- Mauz Parillo - guitar on "Rapture, Rinse, Repeat"
