= This Is No Time ta Sleep =

Studio album by Morning Glory
- Released: 2001
- Genre: Ska punk Crust punk Anarcho-punk
- Length: 55:42
- Label: Revolution Rock

Morning Glory chronology
This Is No Time ta Sleep (2001)	The Suicide Singles (2001)

Professional ratings
Review scores
Source	Rating
PunkNews	4.5/5 stars
Ultimate Guitar	10/10 stars

This Is No Time ta Sleep is the first studio album by New York crust punk band Morning Glory. It was released in 2001 on Revolution Rock Records.

== Track list ==
No.	Title	Length
1.	"It'll Get Better/So Ya Wanna Be a Cop?"	7:03
2.	"Gang Control (feat. Popeye & Skwert)"	3:11
3.	"This Is No Time ta Sleep"	2:06
4.	"Summerburst"	2:49
5.	"Return tha Bomb (feat. Spade & Loon)"	5:15
6.	"Circle N"	2:41
7.	"Long Live Revolution Rock"	3:17
8.	"Extraordinary"	4:02
9.	"Say Something True"	3:17
10.	"The War is Over"	1:53
11.	"The War Returns"	3:35
12.	"So Ya Wanna Be a Cop? (feat. Stza)"	4:08
13.	"Divide By"	5:54
14.	"Travel On"	3:32
15.	"Untitled"	2:59
