= Fuck World Trade =

Album by Leftöver Crack

Studio album by Leftöver Crack
- Released: August 31, 2004
- Genres: Crust punk; ska punk; anarcho-punk; melodic hardcore; hardcore punk; skate punk
- Length: 52:52
- Label: Alternative Tentacles
- Producer: Steve Albini

Leftöver Crack chronology
Rock the 40 Oz: Reloaded (2004)	Fuck World Trade (2004)	Deadline (2007)

Professional ratings
Review scores
Source	Rating
AllMusic	3.5/5 stars
Drowned in Sound	2/10
Kerrang!	3/5 stars
Punknews.org	4.5/5 stars
Riverfront Times	(favorable)

Fuck World Trade is the second album by American punk band Leftöver Crack, released in 2004 on the Alternative Tentacles label.

The album continues the band's self-defined status as anti-racist, anti-sexist, anti-capitalist, and anarcho-communist. It also contains references to the fact that their first album was released the day of the September 11th attacks. Fuck World Trade, released through Alternative Tentacles, displays a freer approach, both lyrically and musically, than the previous work of the band, featuring longer songs and guest appearances by Anti-Flag on "Via Sin Dios" as well as "circus-punks" The World/Inferno Friendship Society on "Soon We'll Be Dead." Despite this, it maintains their distinctive "squat-core", a word members of Leftöver Crack coined to describe their previous band Choking Victim: high-speed ska mixed with thrashy punk and filled with rawly-screamed laments on and indictments of capitalism, the police, homelessness, drug addiction, and American culture. The last track "Operation: M.O.V.E." is a black metal influenced track about a 1985 incident in Philadelphia where police dropped a bomb on the radical African American MOVE organization, killing eleven MOVE members including five children. It also features a hidden instrumental that brings the track length to over 10 minutes. The album was reissued by Fat Wreck Chords in 2015 with four previously unreleased tracks.

== Critical reception ==
Fuck World Trade has had mixed critical reviews. Punknews.org gave the album a highly positive review, saying that "Fuck World Trade is here, and is incredible." Johnny Loftus of AllMusic said that while Stza is "limited" as a vocalist, the album is still "provoking and nonconforming in double and triple amounts" and "real revolution rock." Mat Hocking of Drowned in Sound criticized the lyrics, noting that the song "One Dead Cop" advocates killing police officers but fails to offer a logical argument for doing so.

== Controversy ==
With the title of the album and its artwork, along with the lyrical content being highly offensive to some, the release of the album caused some controversy. The album was reportedly banned by Best Buy, Circuit City, Wal-Mart, and Music Land, among other retailers well before its release date. However, the title of the album predates the World Trade Center attacks. The phrase "Fuck World Trade" was used in a song from the pre-Leftover Crack band Choking Victim's album No Gods, No Managers (released in 1999).

== Track listing ==
No.	Title	Length
1.	"Clear Channel (Fuck Off!)"	4:14
2.	"Life Is Pain"	4:37
3.	"Burn Them Prisons"	3:15
4.	"Gang Control (Morning Glory cover)"	2:42
5.	"Super Tuesday"	4:00
6.	"Via Sin Dios (Featuring Anti-Flag)"	2:14
7.	"Feed the Children (Books of Lies)"	3:21
8.	"One Dead Cop"	3:39
9.	"Ya Can't Go Home"	3:14
10.	"Rock the 40 Oz."	2:28
11.	"Soon We'll Be Dead (Featuring the World/Inferno Friendship Society)"	5:35
12.	"Gringos Son Puercos Feos"	3:08
13.	"Operation: M.O.V.E."	10:25

2015 reissue bonus tracks
No.	Title	Length
14.	"Banned In P.C."	1:33
15.	"The Christ"	1:43
16.	"Apple Pie and Police State"	2:38
17.	"Infested (The Lindane Conspiracy Part I) (Choking Victim Cover)"	2:50
18.	"Fuck World Trade"	11:00
