= Star Fucking Hipsters =

American punk rock band

- Origin: New York City, US
- Genres: Punk rock; ska punk; crack rock steady
- Years active: 2004–2013, 2021–present
- Labels: Alternative Tentacles, Fat Wreck Chords
- Members: Stza (Scott Sturgeon); Suzi Moon; Drew Champion; James McDowell II; Gayla Brooks
- Past members: Kill-c; Frank Piegaro; Chris Pothier; Mikey Erg; Brandon Chevalier-Kolling; Kisston; Jamie Toulon; GiGi; Yula Beeri; Ara Babajian; Nico de Gaillo; Alex Charpentier; P.Nut
- Website: starfuckinghipsters.bandcamp.com

Star Fucking Hipsters is an American punk rock band from New York City that has released albums on Fat Wreck Chords and Alternative Tentacles records. They have been called a "punk supergroup" and feature members from numerous notable bands including Leftöver Crack, Ensign, and The Ergs!

== History ==
=== Initial formation (2004) ===
The band was started in 2004 by Leftöver Crack vocalist/guitarist Stza, and drummer Brandon Chevalier-Kolling. However, they were derailed shortly afterward due to the death of Brandon. Stza decided to continue the band with a line-up consisting of vocalist Kisston (from Help Me Help Me I Can't Breathe), guitarist Jamie Toulon (from Old Skull), and drummer GiGi (from Another Dying Democracy). This line-up played two shows in the summer of 2005 before disbanding.

=== Until We're Dead (2006–2009) ===
The following year, Stza wrote and rehearsed seven new songs with Leftöver Crack drummer Ara Babajian and Ensign guitarist Frank Piegaro. Three of these songs were chosen for inclusion on "Deadline", Leftöver Crack's split album with Citizen Fish, while the remaining four became the basis for the first Star Fucking Hipsters record. The band continued with an entirely new group of musicians, consisting of Stza, Babajian, Piegaro, vocalist Nico de Gaillo (from Casa De Chihuahua) and bassist Yula Beeri (from The World Inferno Friendship Society and Nanuchka). Their debut album Until We're Dead was released by Fat Wreck Chords on September 30, 2008. On December 23, 2008, the band released a music video for "Two Cups of Tea". Babajian and Beeri left the band shortly afterwards and were replaced by drummer Brian ”Pnut” Kozuch and bassist Chris Pothier, of the band BIG Attack!.

=== Never Rest in Peace (2009–2011) ===
The band's second album, Never Rest In Peace, was released on October 20, 2009, by Alternative Tentacles. A music video for the song "3000 Miles Away" featuring actor Ethan Suplee was filmed in November 2009 and premiered by Punknews.org in January 2010. During this time, the band was featured in Tao Lin's 2009 novella, Shoplifting from American Apparel, in which they performed a midnight set at "The Kickstand" at The Fest 7 in Gainesville, Florida.

=== From the Dumpster to the Grave (2011–2013) ===
Their band's third album was originally to be titled "Ska Fucking Hipsters", but was later retitled "From the Dumpster to the Grave". For the recording of the album Mikey Erg, formerly of The Ergs!, joined the band, replacing P.Nut as drummer. It was revealed that folk punk/anarcho-punk band Blackbird Raum and Boots Riley of political hip hop group The Coup would be contributing to the new album, amongst others.

On March 27, 2011, the band announced via Facebook that Nico was leaving the band, saying: "We're sad to announce the departure of Nico de Gallo from our line-up after over three years of happy fun tymes! She will be missed by all. Starting on Tuesday, Kelsy from the Oakland super-group Chump-Change will be assuming co-lead vocals with myself, your humble newscaster, Sturgil Crizil." Though she had departed and was quickly replaced, Nico had already recorded all of her vocals for the band's third album.

It was also announced on April 5, 2011, via Facebook that the band had plans to release a split 7-inch with hardcore punk/thrash band Jesus Fucking Christ through Inimical Records. SFH contributed three songs to the split, including a cover of Rudimentary Peni's "Media Person".

From the Dumpster to the Grave was released on October 11, 2011, on Fat Wreck Chords. The subsequent record release party was the band's last show of the year. The long-awaited split 7-inch with Jesus Fucking Christ, known as "The Fucking Split" was released on June 26, 2012. They were also confirmed to play the Rebellion festival in 2012 alongside The Choking Victim Show – a band featuring Stza and members of Irish ska-punk band Chewing on Tinfoil playing Choking Victim songs.

=== Return to Live Shows (2021–present) ===
In November of 2021, it was announced that the band would be playing their first show since 2013. This announcement also included a new line up include Suzi Moon of Turbulent Hearts and the Suzi Moon Band on vocals, James McDowell of Gen Why and Crime Revenge on guitar, Drew Champion of The Split Seconds on bass, and Gayla Brooks of Fat Heaven on drums.

== Band members ==
Current Members

- Stza – vocals, guitar (2004–2013, 2021-present)
- Suzi Moon – vocals (2021-present)
- James McDowell – guitar (2021-present)
- Drew Champion – bass (2021-present)
- Gayla Brooks – drums (2021-present)

Former Members

- Brandon Chevalier-Kolling – drums (2004, died 2004)
- GiGi – drums (2005)
- Kisston – vocals (2005)
- Jamie Toulon – guitar (2005)
- Frank Piegaro – guitar (2006–2013)
- Nico de Gaillo – vocals (2006–2011)
- Yula Beeri – bass (2006–2009)
- Ara Babajian – drums (2006–2008)
- Alex Charpentier – drums (2008–2009)
- Chris Pothier – bass (2009–2013)
- Brian "Pnut" Kozuch – drums (2009–2011)
- Mikey Erg – drums (2011–2013)
- Kelsey "Kill-C" – vocals (2011–2013)

== Discography ==
- Until We're Dead – (2008)
- Never Rest in Peace – (2009)
- From the Dumpster to the Grave – (2011)
- The Fucking Split (split with Jesus Fucking Christ) – (2012)
