= Anita Altman =

American entrepreneur and city planner (born 1945)

- Born: June 2, 1945 (age 78)
- Occupations: Entrepreneur and city planner

Anita Altman (born June 2, 1945) is an American social entrepreneur and city planner. Altman co-founded ReelAbilities, the largest film festival in the United States dedicated to films by or about people with disabilities. Altman is involved in Jewish feminism, and a member of New York's B’Nai Jeshrun synagogue. Altman is the mother of Sascha Altman DuBrul, who co-founded the Icarus Project.

== Early life and education ==
Altman was raised in a working-class Greek Jewish community in the East Bronx. Her Romaniote Jewish grandparents, Anna and Zadick Coffino, emigrated from the Ottoman Empire to the Lower East Side of Manhattan, before settling in Hunts Point Her father, Jack Altman, an Ashkenazi Jewish plumber, married their daughter Sarah Coffino.

Altman attended the all-girls Hunter College High School. She received a B.A. in political science from The City College of New York in 1967, and a Master of Professional Studies in Health Services Administration from the New School for Social Research in 1982.

In 2014, Altman was awarded the City Colleges' Alumni Association's Townsend Harris medal for post-graduate achievement.

Altman has one older brother, Stanley Altman, who is a professor at Baruch College.

== Career ==
While working at the New York City's Planning Department, Altman participated in developing the Master Plan for the city.

While working in New York's Health Services Administration, she focused on improving prison health services.

Altman worked as the Director of Community Development for Co-op City, organizing human service providers and an array of cultural programs.

As deputy director of Montefiore Medical Center's Building Program, Altman worked with hospital administrators, architects, the City Planning Commission, and community representatives to help plan the reconstruction and expansion of the hospital.

Altman served on Manhattan's Community Board 7 for ten years from 1973 to 1983 and was the co-chair of its Social and Health Care Services sub-committee for several of those years.

=== AIDS/HIV and NORCs ===
In 1987, Altman began working at the UJA-Federation and spearheaded the first grant proposal to fund “A Jewish Response to the AIDS Epidemic,” which helped establish training and educational programs and create service programs linking hospitals and community-based agencies. UJA-Federation became one of the five founding members of the New York AIDS Coalition, which emerged as the largest AIDS advocacy organization in New York State.

Altman worked to raise support for Naturally Occurring Retirement Communities (NORCs) as environments to organize communities with substantial senior populations. Altman supported enabling an increasing number of seniors “to age in place.” Altman helped execute the program concepts pioneered at Penn South, a union-sponsored, moderate-income housing co-op in Manhattan's Chelsea community, including a program with the goal of helping senior residents remain living in their own homes. This supportive service program (SSP) mobilized the community and built partnerships between senior residents, housing management, and health and social service agencies to achieve that end. With the support of the Robert Wood Foundation, the program was replicated and in 1994 the New York State Legislature passed the first NORC-SSP legislation in the country, providing matching grants to an original 10 programs. This was followed in 1999 by the establishment of the New York City NORC funded by its City Council.

In 1993, Altman convened a group of authorities in related fields to address the question of domestic violence in the Jewish community. This resulted in her founding the UJA-Federation Task Force on Family Violence. Which in 2001, received the New York State Governor's COURAGE award. In 2008, Altman received the Woman of Valor award from the New York Board of Rabbis for her work with the Task Force.

Altman also founded the UJA-Federation Task Force on People with Disabilities, which focused on serving disabled people and their families throughout the New York metro area.

=== ReelAbilities Film Festival ===
During her work with the UJA Task Force on People with Disabilities, Altman decided that films could be an effective medium to help create wider public awareness about people with disabilities. In partnership with the Jewish Community Center in Manhattan, she founded ReelAbilities: New York Disabilities Film Festival.

ReelAbilities is now the largest film festival in the country dedicated to promoting awareness and appreciation of people with different disabilities, with 13 cities currently sponsoring festivals. Altman herself has said, “It is a festival with a social mission, namely to change public perception and understanding of who people with disabilities are.”
