= Ezra Kire =

American singer-songwriter

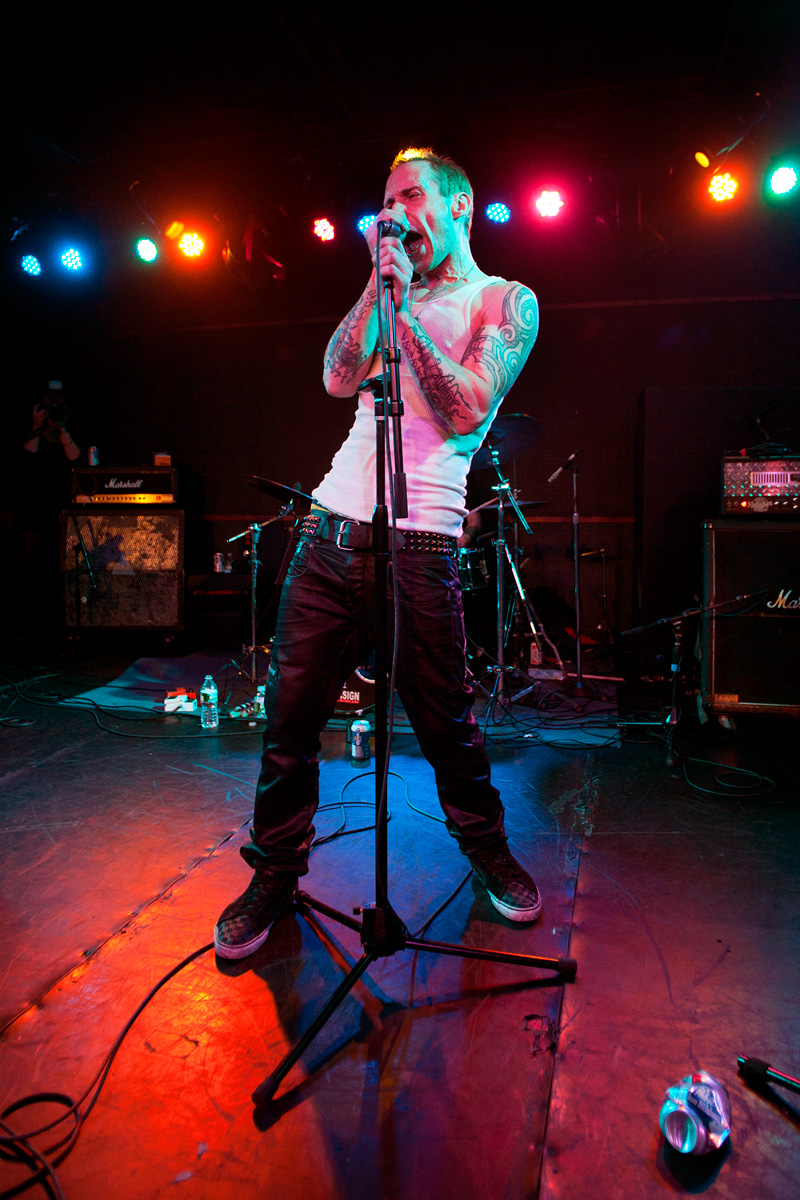
Performing with Morning Glory at the Knitting Factory in 2010 (Brooklyn, New York).

Ezra Cannon (born December 30, 1975), known by the stage name Ezra Kire, is an American musician. He is a member of the punk band Morning Glory, and a former member of Leftöver Crack, Choking Victim and INDK.

== Early life ==
Ezra Cannon was born on December 30, 1975, in the town of Grand Forks, North Dakota. His family moved frequently around North America during his childhood, before eventually moving to Colombo, Sri Lanka, where he attended the Overseas School of Colombo. He started his first band there with friend Derek Dees in 8th grade; The duo played their first show at the school cafeteria in 1990, and another two shows later that year, including the senior prom.

After leaving Sri Lanka, he moved to Nelson, British Columbia, where he played in the band Dead Faculty. After Ben Millard joined on guitar they played for a few years before Millard and Ezra formed Celler Of The Sun, with Dale Butterfield on drums and Ferdy Belland on bass. They recorded two albums before Cannon returned to the United States.

== Choking Victim and Leftöver Crack ==
In 1998 Kire joined the political ska-punk band Choking Victim on lead guitar. The band split after the release of their debut album in 1999, No Gods, No Managers, having broken up during the recording session for the album. During this period Kire formed the band InDK, and began recording music by himself under the moniker Morning Glory. In 2001 he reunited with former Choking Victim bandmate Scott "Stza" Sturgeon, to join his newly-formed political ska-punk band Leftöver Crack.

From early on Leftöver Crack had a public dispute with their record label, Hellcat Records (a subsidiary of Epitaph Records) over censorship regarding their proposed album title Shoot the Kids at School, and its accompanying artwork. On September 11, 2001 Leftöver Crack released their debut album Mediocre Generica. In order to avoid further contractual disputes with the label, the band released their split EP with F-Minus, Baby Jesus, Sliced Up In The Manger, under the pseudonym The Crack Rock Steady 7 in 2001 with Hell Bent Records. For their second album Fuck World Trade (2004) the band moved to Jello Biafra's label Alternative Tentacles, and recorded the album in Chicago with engineer/producer Steve Albini. In addition to this publicized dispute with their label, Leftöver Crack attracted considerable attention from the NYPD.

In early 2012 Kire left Leftöver Crack in order to concentrate on Morning Glory, stating that he "wanted to move on and do other things".

== InDK & Morning Glory ==
Shortly after the break-up of Choking Victim, Kire started the short-lived skate-punk band InDK with other members of the New York punk scene, including ex-Choking Victim drummer Skwert. The band released one EP In Decay in 1999, and one album Kill Whitey!, which was released in 2002 after the band had broken up during its recording sessions.

In early 2001 Kire self-released the Morning Glory EP Tha Suicide Singles, recorded and played entirely by himself. The music was a more personal and polished version of Kire's melodic and anthemic song writing. Later that same year the project expanded into a full band and released its first album This is No Time Ta Sleep. The new line-up was made up of JP Otto (Stockyard Stoics) on drums, guitarists Lucky Strano (World Inferno Friendship Society) and Mike Hause (Thulsa Doom), and bassist John John Jesse (Nausea). In 2003 they released the EP The Whole World Is Watching with recording engineer Jesse Cannon at Musformation Studios in Union City, New Jersey. In 2008 they went on a brief tour of the west coast of the United States.

The band returned again in 2010 with a new line-up, including Early Gates on drums, "Metal" Chris on bass, and guitarists Shawn Gardiner and Adam Schrager. In 2012 Morning Glory was signed to Fat Wreck Chords, and released their second full-length album Poets Were My Heroes on August 28 of the same year. From late 2012 the band embarked on tours of the Mid West and West Coast of the U.S., and toured the UK and Europe from March to April 2013. They released the album's accompanying single Born To December in May 2013, featuring two unreleased songs Sara Says and Jesus Christ Boogie (O Aneurysm!), as a 7-inch EP on colored vinyl.

In March 2014 the band released their third album War Psalms (Fat Wreck Chords).

== Personal life ==
Kire currently lives in New York City.

== Discography ==
Solo

- Speakers in the Sky (LP) Anxious and Angry, 2017

with Choking Victim

- No Gods, No Managers (LP) Hellcat Records, 1999.

with InDK

- In Decay (EP) Tent City Records, 1999.
- Kill Whitey! (LP) Go-Kart Records, 2002.

with Leftöver Crack

- Mediocre Generica (LP) Hellcat Records, 2001.
- †Baby Jesus, Sliced Up in The Manger (Split EP with F-Minus) Hell Bent Records, 2001.
- Fuck World Trade (LP) Alternative Tentacles, 2004.
- Baby Punchers / Meltdown (Split 7-inch with Citizen Fish) Fat Wreck Chords, 2006
- Deadline (Split EP with Citizen Fish) Alternative Tentacles, 2007.

†Released under the name Crack Rock Steady 7

with Morning Glory

- Tha Suicide Singles (EP) Revolution Rock Records, 2001.
- This Is No Time Ta Sleep (LP) Revolution Rock Records, 2001.
- The Whole World Is Watching (EP) Blacknoise Recordings, 2003.
- Poets Were My Heroes (LP) Fat Wreck Chords, 2012.
- Born to December (7-inch) Fat Wreck Chords, 2013.
- Always Alone (Split 7-inch, with Off With Their Heads) Fat Wreck Chords, 2013.
- War Psalms (LP) Fat Wreck Chords, 2014.
- Post War Psalms (EP) Anxious and Angry/Buyback Records, 2016.
