= Mediocre Generica =

Studio album by Leftöver Crack
- Released: September 11, 2001
- Recorded: 1999–2001
- Genres: Crust punk; ska punk; anarcho-punk
- Length: 33:01
- Label: Hellcat
- Producers: Stza; Tim Armstrong

Leftöver Crack chronology
Mediocre Generica (2001)	Fuck World Trade (2004)

Professional ratings
Review scores
Source	Rating
AllMusic	3/5 stars
Winnipeg Sun	3.5/5 stars

Mediocre Generica is the debut studio album by the American punk band Leftöver Crack. It was released on September 11, 2001 and includes much sociopolitical commentary, including anti-police sentiment, anti-racism and anti-homophobia. The album was originally intended to be titled Shoot the Kids at School, which Hellcat Records objected to. As Stza said in an interview, "They wanted mediocre generic artwork and they wanted a mediocre generic title, so I called it Mediocre Generica and I guarantee you the irony was lost on Epitaph". This has been cited as one of the main reasons that Leftöver Crack made the move to the much smaller label Alternative Tentacles. The album was coincidentally released on the same day as the September 11 terrorist attacks, and during the introduction on the band's next release, Fuck World Trade, this album is referred to as "the tower-toppling Mediocre Generica".

== Track listing ==
No.	Title	Length
1.	"Homeo-Apathy"	2:23
2.	"Nazi White Trash"	3:00
3.	"Atheist Anthem"	3:18
4.	"The Good, the Bad & the Leftöver Crack"	2:29
5.	"Gay Rude Boys Unite"	2:39
6.	"N.C."	0:59
7.	"Interlude"	1:25
8.	"Stop the Insanity"	3:00
9.	"Crack City Rockers"	2:31
10.	"Burning in Water"	2:05
11.	"With the Sickness"	1:11
12.	"Born to Die"	4:42
13.	"Gay Rude Boys Unite" (Instrumental)	3:29
Total length:		33:01

== Personnel ==
- Scott Sturgeon - vocals, producer
- Ezra Kire - additional vocals, guitar
- Alec Baillie - bass
- Ara Babajian - drums
- Pezent Shayne Webb - piano
- Deston Berry - Hammond organ
- Hilary Allen - Hammond organ
- Lady Jericha - Wurlitzer organ
- John Dolan - harmonica (track 13)
- Christopher LaSalle - trumpet (track 13)
- Kenny Lienhardt - engineer
- Mike Trujillo - engineer
- Kevin Bartley - mastering
- Seth Oleneck - photography
- Lorien Babajian - layout
- Joel "Rage" Garcia - additional layout

== Release history ==
Region	Date	Format(s)	Label(s)
Europe	August 28, 2001	CD; Digipak; digital download	Hellcat Records
United States	September 11, 2001	CD; Digipak; digital download; LP	Hellcat Records
