= Constructs of the State =

Studio album by Leftöver Crack
- Released: November 27, 2015
- Genre: Crust punk, anarcho-punk, ska punk
- Length: 36:57
- Label: Fat Wreck Chords

Leftöver Crack chronology
Deadline (2007)	Constructs of the State (2015)	Leftöver Leftöver Crack (2018)

Professional ratings
Review scores
Source	Rating
New Noise	Favorable
Punktastic	Mixed
Punknews.org	4.5/5 stars
SLUG Magazine	Favorable

Constructs of the State is the third album by American crust punk band Leftöver Crack, released in 2015 on the Fat Wreck Chords label. It features guest appearances from Jesse Michaels, Joe Jack Talcum and Penny Rimbaud as well as members of Bouncing Souls, All Torn Up, Mischief Brew, Riverboat Gamblers, Blackbird Raum, Days N Daze, Conquest for Death, REIVERS, and Intro5pect.

== Track listing ==
No.	Title	Length
1.	"Archaic Subjugation"	1:19
2.	"Don’t Shoot"	2:20
3.	"Loneliness & Heartache"	2:26
4.	"System Fucked" (feat. Jesse Michaels)	2:54
5.	"Slave to the Throne"	2:22
6.	"Bedbugs & Beyond" (feat. Kate Coysh and Days N'Daze)	1:59
7.	"Corrupt Vision"	1:28
8.	"Last Legs" (Blackbird Raum cover)	3:43
9.	"The Lie of Luck"	3:37
10.	"¡Poliamor Fiesta Crack!"	2:12
11.	"Vicious Constructs"	3:56
12.	"Amanecer de los Muertos"	3:18
13.	"The War at Home" (previously appeared on Realpolitik!)	4:56
