= Roberto Miguel =

Roberto Miguel Reyes
- Also known as: Miguel from Oakland
- Born: January 26, 1981 (age 44)
- Origin: Oakland, California, US
- Genres: Singer-songwriter, Folk punk, anti-folk, folk, country
- Years active: 2005–present
- Labels: lakebed recordings
- Website: http://www.robertomiguel.org

Roberto Miguel, a.k.a. Miguel from Oakland (born January 26, 1981, in Oakland, California), is an American singer, songwriter, and visual artist. His music often utilizes a mixture of political ideologies, humorous themes, surreal self-retrospection and local identity. He has played with Leftöver Crack and Citizen Fish.

== Musical career ==
Starting the trombone from age 12, with musical instruction from east bay anti-violence activist Andres Soto. Miguel soon accomplished the styles of jazz, ska and various Latin styles.

While performing with Leftöver Crack, Miguel was invited to join another Alternative Tentacles band, Citizen Fish, on their U.S. and U.K. tours. He has been a member since.

== Poetry and art ==
Miguel was once referenced by American comics in a series titled BellyButton Comix by Sophie Crumb. In 2007, Miguel produced a series of intricate etching and pen line drawings inspired by concepts in George Bataille's seminal book The Accursed Share. In 2009, his art was video projected at the Whitney Museum of American Art in New York city by a band performing there. It was presented as a video art project accompanying his song, seasons. It was not an official Whitney Museum exhibit.

=== Discography ===
- Stairwells – self-released (2007)
- After Dancing – lakebed Recordings (2009)
