= Virus Nine =

American punk rock band

Virus Nine was an American punk rock band from Southern, Oregon, United States. Established in 1995 and disbanded in 2012, after playing their final show in memory of Josh "J-Train" Guillory (founding member and lifelong friend of vocalist Mike Estes).

== Former members ==
- Guitar: Josh Guillory - Original Member (deceased)
- Vocals: Mike Estes - Original Member
- Drums: Ryan Dingee - Original Member
- Bass: Tim Russell - Original Member
- Drums Josh Wurtz (deceased)
- Bass: Tim Capehart
- Guitar: Daniel Peel
- Guitar: Daniel Benne
- Guitar: Mike Bertrand
- Guitar: Silas Shand
- Bass: Caleb Guillory (deceased)
- Bass: Danny Cantwell
- Drums: Aaron Benson

== Discography ==
- "51' at Enewetak" (1998 7" Vinyl) Mental Records
- What Are You Afraid Of? (2002 CD) A-F Records
- Blastin' Away (2003 CD) A-F Records (Produced by Duane Peters)
- Virus Nine / Hudson Falcons Split (2007 7" Vinyl) City Rat Records (German Import)
