= A-F Records =

American independent record label

- Founded: 1997
- Founder: Anti-Flag
- Defunct: 2023
- Status: Inactive
- Distributor: RedEye
- Genre: Punk rock, hardcore punk
- Country of origin: U.S.
- Location: Pittsburgh, Pennsylvania
- Official website: www.a-frecords.com

A-F Records was an American independent record label founded by punk rock band Anti-Flag – namely the band's drummer Pat Thetic, their rhythm guitarist Chris Head, and their lead vocalist Justin Sane – and based in Pittsburgh, Pennsylvania. It was created to help expose more political punk bands to a larger audience.

== History ==
The band founded the label in 1997 so they could release their 1998 compilation album Their System Doesn't Work for You. The compilation was the first official release under the label as well.

Following the release of their own compilation, the band approached the Pittsburgh-based band Reagan Squad and the Boston-based band The Unseen, both of whom they believed to be "socially conscious," and the two bands released their own full-length LPs through A-F Records. The releases from Reagan Squad and The Unseen were the first non-Anti-Flag albums to be released by the label. Later, the band released East Coast Punk, a compilation featuring several bands that had worked with A-F Records, and stated that they donated the proceeds to a women's shelter. Due to financial concerns, the band exclusively released the East Coast Punk compilation on cassette and distributed it at concerts put on by bands on their label.

The label's offices were damaged when a September 2004 flood hit Pittsburgh. Although employees saved much of the equipment and inventory, A-F Records dropped the artists Inhuman, Tabula Rasa, and Virus Nine in the wake of the flood for financial reasons.

The label's music was formerly distributed on Mordam but moved to RedEye when Mordam was bought by Lumberjack in early 2006.

=== Dissolution ===
On July 19, 2023, Anti-Flag posted an update on their Patreon announcing their disbandment and the intention to refund fans who were subscribed. Following this announcement, their website was taken down, and the band's social media accounts were deleted. When asked to offer a statement regarding the breakup, the band's publicist declined to comment. Stereogum and Us Weekly linked Anti-Flag's July 2023 breakup to a podcast episode released on July 19, the same day as the band's dissolution, that leveled accusations of sexual assault against "a singer in a political punk band" believed to be frontman Justin Sane. In the following months, twelve more women and girls would come forward to accuse Sane of sexual misconduct, grooming, sexual assault, and rape.

Within days of Anti-Flag's breakup, several bands announced their departure from A-F Records, including American Television, Celebration Summer, Darien Gap, Hanalei, Reconciler, Sammy Kay, and Wolves & Wolves & Wolves & Wolves. Several of the bands' departures were mentioned in a September 2023 Rolling Stone exposé discussing the additional accusations against Sane. In the Rolling Stone exposé, the band also informed the magazine that they were "in the process of unwinding the label, including returning master rights and physical records/merchandise to the bands, which will take some time to complete properly."

== Most recent active artists ==
- Antillectual
- All Dinosaurs
- Audio Karate
- Chris Stowe
- Dead Bars
- Devon Kay & the Solutions
- Dollar Signs
- Edhochuli
- Endless Mike and the Beagle Club
- Intro5pect
- Justin Sane
- The Homeless Gospel Choir
- Lawn Care
- Rational Anthem
- White Wives
- Worship This!

== Former artists ==
- American Television
- Anti-Flag
- Celebration Summer
- Darien Gap
- Darkest Hour (A-F Records released Archives, which is a compilation album featuring the band's first two independent EPs)
- Destruction Made Simple
- Endless Struggle
- Hanalei
- Inhuman
- Inquisition
- A Lovely Crisis
- Modey Lemon
- Morning Glory
- Much the Same
- New Mexican Disaster Squad
- Pipedown
- Reconciler
- Red Lights Flash
- Sammy Kay
- Spanish Love Songs
- Swiss Army
- Tabula Rasa
- The Code
- The Methadones
- The Unseen
- Thought Riot
- Virus Nine
- Whatever It Takes
- Wolves & Wolves & Wolves & Wolves
- World's Scariest Police Chases

== See also ==
- List of record labels
