= Alec Baillie =

American bassist (died 2020)

- Origin: Manhattan
- Died: November 10, 2020
- Genres: Punk rock, ska punk
- Occupation: Musician
- Instrument: Bass guitar
- Years active: 1990s-2020
- Formerly of: Choking Victim, Agent 99, Leftöver Crack

Alec Baillie (died November 10, 2020) was an American bassist. He played in the bands Choking Victim, Agent 99, and Leftöver Crack.

== Biography ==
Baillie grew up in Manhattan and attended the same high school as his future bandmate Scott "Stza" Sturgeon. In the early 1990s, Baillie, Dunia Best, Jay Nugent and Ara Babajian formed the third wave ska band, Agent 99. In 1998, three years after the band had split up, a compilation album, Little Pieces 1993–1995, was released. Baillie then formed a short lived punk band called No Commercial Value with Stza. Baillie later joined Stza's band Choking Victim after the departure of original bassist Sascha Scatter, and went on to play in Choking Victim from 1995 to 1997.

Upon the dissolution of Choking Victim, Baillie went on to join a familiar lineup in Leftöver Crack. Its members include Stza and Ezra, both of whom played with Baillie in the now defunct Choking Victim.

Baillie died on November 10, 2020. He was reportedly on suicide watch the night before, but the official cause of death is listed as accidental drug overdose of heroin, buprenorphine and alprazolam.

== Discography ==
Discography
Band	Album	Label	Year
No Commercial Value	No Commercial Value (Cassette)	N/A	1990
Agent 99	Agent 99 (Cassette)	N/A	1994
Agent 99	The Biggest Boy (7")	N/A	1995
Choking Victim	Squatta's Paradise (7")	Whattsa Matta U Rekidz	1996
Agent 99	Little Pieces: 1993–1995 (CD)	Shanachie	1997
Choking Victim	Crack Rock Steady / Squatta's Paradise Split (CD)	Tent City Records	2000
Leftöver Crack	Rock the 40 oz. (7")	Bankshot! Records	2000
Leftöver Crack	Mediocre Generica (CD, 12")	Hellcat Records	2001
The Crack Rock Steady 7	"Baby Jesus, Sliced Up in the Manger" (CD, 10")	Hell Bent Records	2001
Leftöver Crack	Fuck World Trade (CD, 12")	Alternative Tentacles	2004
Leftöver Crack	Actor "Band Member 1" in the film Loren Cass	Directed by Chris Fuller	2006
Leftöver Crack	"Baby-Punchers" (7")	Fat Wreck Chords	2006
Leftöver Crack	"Look Who's Talking Now" (7")	Blacknoise Recordings	2006
Leftöver Crack	Deadline (CD, 12")	Fat Wreck Chords	2007
Leftöver Crack	Constructs of the State (CD, 12")	Fat Wreck Chords	2015
