= Sascha Altman DuBrul =

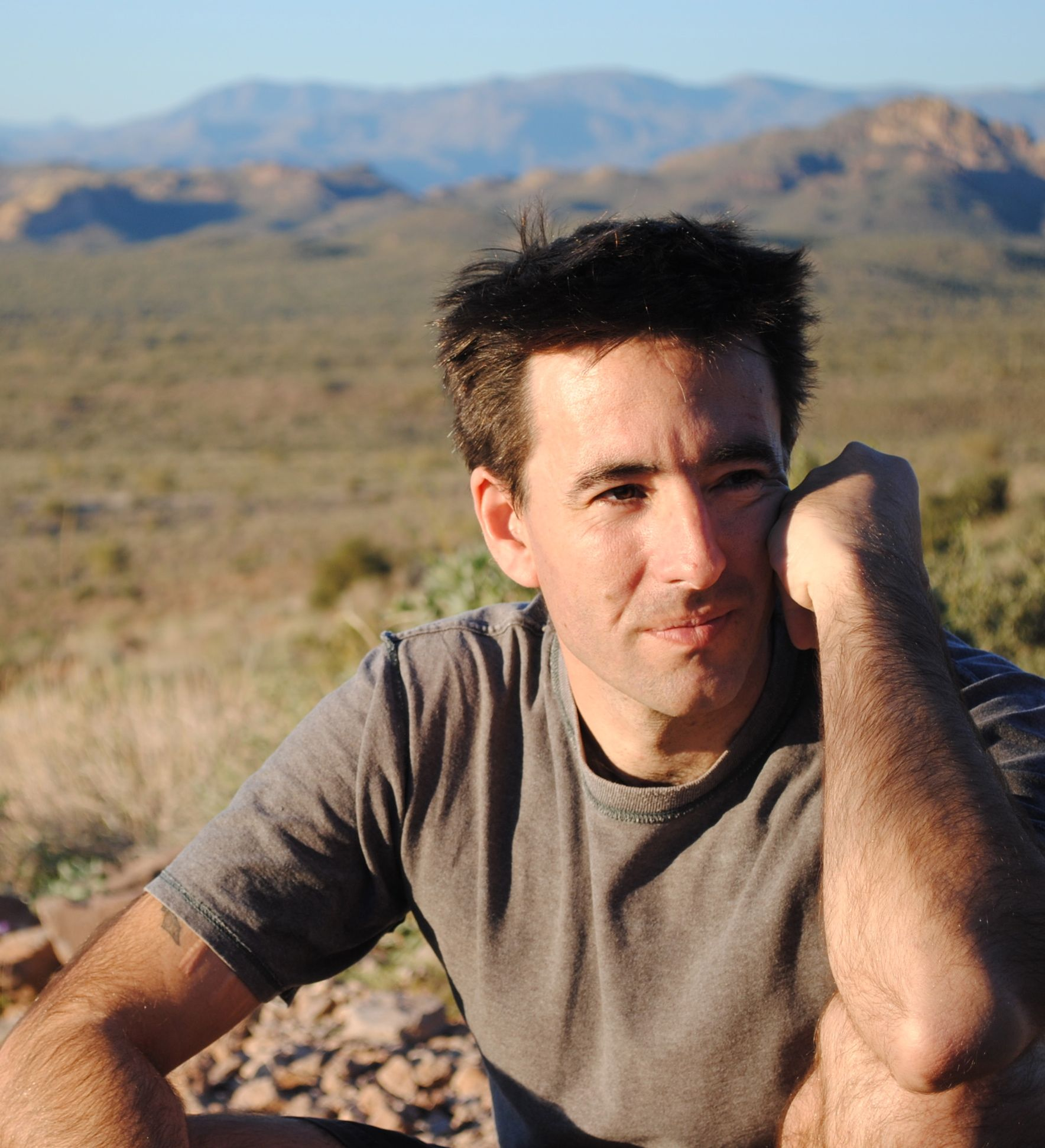

Background information
- Also known as: Sascha Scatter
- Born: Sascha Altman DuBrul; 1974 (age 51–52)
- Origin: New York City
- Genre: punk rock
- Occupations: Activist, writer, musician
- Formerly of: Choking Victim

Sascha Altman DuBrul, a.k.a. Sascha DuBrul or Sascha Scatter, (born 1974) is an American activist, writer, farmer and punk rock musician known as the bass player of the 1990s ska-punk band Choking Victim.

He is also the co-founder of The Icarus Project, an international community support network and media project, which is attempting to redefine the language and culture of mental health and illness. He founded the Bay Area Seed Interchange Library (BASIL). He divides his time between the San Francisco Bay Area and New York City.

== Early life ==
DuBrul was raised on the Upper West Side of Manhattan, the son of Anita Altman, the founder and deputy director of the ReelAbilities: NY Disabilities Film Festival. His father, Paul DuBrul, was a journalist and speechwriter who died the night before DuBrul's Bar Mitzvah. In an interview with the Village Voice, DuBrul described his childhood: "I was raised by democratic socialists who believed in electoral politics…but my political education happened amidst the Tompkins Square riots of the late '80s.” In his teens, DuBrul found community among punks and anarchist squatters on the Lower East Side.

== Early Education ==
After attending Hunter College Elementary School and Bronx High School of Science, DuBrul graduated from St. Ann’s School in Brooklyn. He attended Reed College in Portland, Oregon for a year but dropped out after having a psychotic break. In a 2002 article for the San Francisco Bay Guardian, DuBrul wrote: "I was 18 years old the first time they locked me up in a psych ward. The police found me walking on the subway tracks in New York City, and I was convinced the world was about to end and I was being broadcast live on prime-time TV on all the channels.” He was diagnosed with bipolar disorder.

== Musical career and writing ==
After dropping out of Reed, DuBrul played in the ska-punk band Choking Victim. In 1995, he co-organized a traveling punk circus, which he then wrote about in his first book Carnival of Chaos: On the Road With the Nomadic Festival, published by Autonomedia. For eight years, DuBrul wrote a quarterly column for the punk zine Slug and Lettuce. DuBrul has written and lectured about the perceived relationships between punk, activist culture, racial identity, oppression, and privilege. His memoir Maps to the Other Side was released in 2013 and focuses on DuBrul's navigation of the psychiatric system and creative mental health advocacy. In recent years, his writing has focused on drawing links between punk rock, Judaism, and the power and complexities of spiritual community.

== Activism and travels ==
In his early twenties, DuBrul traveled to Mexico and Central America and worked with the Zapatista Uprising in Chiapas. Inspired by his experiences in Mexico, he went on to participate in a diverse number of activist projects: from Earth First! road blockades of the Pacific Northwest, to the fight to save the community gardens in New York City, to the protests against the World Trade Organization in Seattle in November 1999. Often DuBrul would travel between activist projects on freight trains. The details of his wanderings across the country and through Mexico often ended up in zines which, according to the Village Voice, "combine[d] adventure-travel tales with thoughtful observations about the global economy.” DuBrul was the inspiration for singer Jolie Holland's song Sascha.

== Bay Area Seed Interchange Library ==
While interning at a CSA farm in British Columbia, DuBrul became fascinated by permaculture and the genetic relationships that arose when domestic crops intermingled with their wild relatives. Having been raised in Manhattan, his urban sensibilities spawned his thinking about agriculture and what he believed was the need to revitalize older methods of community seed production. In 2000, he founded the first urban seed lending library: the Bay Area Seed Interchange Library, or BASIL. In an interview with the New York Times, DuBrul said: “An urban seed library is about the relationship between biological and cultural diversity, and people having a direct connection to the seeds that are growing their foods.” BASIL has become a model for other seed libraries across the country, including the Hudson Valley Seed Library, the first seed library in a public library in the country. According to Michael Carolan, there are currently more than 660 seed libraries in 48 states in the US. The author Ruth Ozeki drew from DuBrul’s vision of seed activism for her New York Times Notable Book All Over Creation.

== The Icarus Project ==
In 2002, DuBrul wrote "Bipolar World", an article published in the San Francisco Bay Guardian, relating his personal experiences being diagnosed with bipolar disorder. Among the dozens of e-mails and other correspondence that he received after this publication was a letter from Jacks Ashley McNamara, an artist and writer who identified strongly with his experiences. DuBrul and McNamara corresponded for a few weeks to form The Icarus Project, devoted to creating a new view of mental illness. DuBrul has been quoted as claiming he has "superpowers" due to his allegedly heightened sensitivity to his surroundings.

The Icarus Project is an online, international radical community support network and media project with over 14,000 participants. It has numerous local groups across North America and has released a number of publications. Navigating the Space Between Brilliance and Madness; A Reader and Roadmap of Bipolar Worlds was published by the Icarus Project in March 2004 and is currently in its 10th printing.

== Tours and teaching ==
Shortly after the Icarus launched, DuBrul embarked on a tour of North America, facilitating workshops and leading discussions on alternative conceptions of mental illness and wellness. After the tour, Dubrul worked with McNamara and other Icarus members to create a guide for creating community support around madness and mental health. This was published under the title "Friends Make the Best Medicine."

In 2007, DuBrul and a group of fellow Icarus Project members organized the "Mad Gifts Tour." As part of this tour, the group visited Virginia Tech soon after the April 16th massacre of 32 students, which stirred controversy about mental health on college campuses.

DuBrul toured Europe in 2011, facilitating workshops and giving talks about radical mental health support. During the summers of 2010 and 2012, he co-taught month long seminars at the Esalen Institute in Big Sur.

In the Spring of 2013, in conjunction with the release of his book, Maps to the Other Side, DuBrul, along with Icarus Project co-founder Ashley Jacks McNamara, toured the United States giving readings, and conducting workshops and discussions on mental health.

== Public Mental System and the Mad Underground ==
After 12 years, DuBrul stepped back from his work with the Icarus Project to train as a clinician in the public mental health system. He attended social work school at Silberman School of Social Work, which included a year long internship (in dialogic practice) with the Parachute Project, and he was then hired by the Center for Practice Innovations at the New York State Psychiatric Institute as a trainer of Peer Specialists in First Episode Psychosis programs. While at the Institute, he was the first author for the Peer Specialist manual for OnTrackNY.

During this period, DuBrul also helped to develop the Institute for the Development of Human Arts (IDHA), a training institute for mental health workers. This institute offers training to clinicians and peer workers in order to think about their personal relationship to mental health and illness. It is also building a network of mentorship to positively transform the mental health system.

Dubrul is quoted as saying that “his interests lie at the intersection of the public mental health system and the Mad Underground.”

In recent years, DuBrul has focused on his private practice and developing the growing Transformative Mental Health Movement. He is a public proponent and practitioner of the Internal Family Systems therapy model.

In 2022, he taught the “Severe Mental Illness” course at the Community Mental Health program at the California Institute of Integral Studies. Later that year, DuBrul spoke on a panel hosted by IDHA called “Movement Lineages” where he and other movement leaders reflected “on how radical mental health organizing has shifted and evolved over the past several decades” to “share key lessons that can inform future work.”

== Publications ==
- Carnival of Chaos: On the Road With the Nomadic Festival 1996. Autonomedia ISBN 978-1-57027-047-5
- El Otro Lado (The Other Side). 1999. Self-published zine.
- Walking the Edge of Insanity. 2002. Published by The Icarus Project
- Blinking Red Lights and the Souls of Our Friends. 2003. Self-published zine.
- Navigating the Space Between Brilliance and Madness; A Reader and Roadmap of Bipolar Worlds. 2004. The Icarus Project. Currently in its 6th printing.
- Mutant Superpowers & Lithium Pills. 2006. Self-published zine.
- Maps to The Other Side: the Adventures of A Bipolar Cartographer 2013. Microcosm Publishing
- Wege auf die andere Seite. In: Will Hall, Jenseits der Psychiatrie – Stimmen und Visionen des Wahnsinns im Madness Radio. Berlin & Lancaster: Peter Lehmann Publishing 2023, pp. 321–326. ISBN 978-3-910546-23-3, ISBN 978-3-910546-26-4
