= Choking Victim =

American punk band

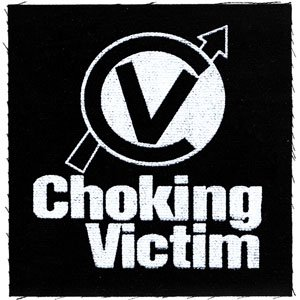
- Band's logo patch

Background information
- Origin: New York City, NY, U.S.
- Genres: Ska punk, hardcore punk, crack rock steady
- Years active: 1992–1998, 2016–present
- Label: Hellcat
- Past members: Scott Sturgeon; Skwert Gunn; Sascha DuBrul; John Dolan; Alec Baillie; Shayne Webb; Ezra Kire

Choking Victim is an American punk band formed in New York City, which lasted from 1992 to 1998. They played a mix of hardcore punk and ska (sometimes known as ska-core). They also coined to term “Crack Rock Steady” which can be seen as another punk genre. Following the breakup of the band, which occurred the same day as the recording of their only studio album No Gods, No Managers, members went on to form Leftöver Crack and INDK, among others.

== Background ==
The band became well-known at the C-Squat on the Lower East Side of Manhattan for their innovative music and politically charged lyrics. They also became infamous for their Satanic imagery and references to the vagrant lifestyle, including smoking both crack cocaine and marijuana, shoplifting, and squatting. The band prides itself on its atheism, and makes frequent references to Satan. On the album No Gods, No Managers, they use excerpts from the lectures of political scientist Michael Parenti.

=== Breakup ===
Choking Victim broke up after the first day of recording for their first full-length LP, No Gods, No Managers, but the recordings from that one day were enough to make a full album. After they broke up, Stza formed the band Leftöver Crack, and Skwert and Ezra formed INDK. Ezra joined Leftöver Crack in 2001. Skwert is currently the front man for the New Jersey–based ska punk band Public Serpents. Sascha has spent the last several years organically farming in upstate New York, and is a founding member of Icarus Project, a radical mental health network. He has also earned his Master Of Social Work (MSW) as a clinician working at Columbia University's Medical Center and the New York State Psychiatric Institute.

=== Reunions ===
On November 11, 2000, Choking Victim reunited to play a show in Tompkins Square Park with the lineup from their album, substituting former bassist Alec for Shayne. Later, in late 2005, Choking Victim reunited a second time, performing four shows. On June 11, 2006, they played a show at the Lower East Side's Tompkins Square Park, which featured various political speakers, including members of the Mislead Youth Project. At the end of July 2006, they toured the Dominican Republic, before Leftöver Crack embarked on their European Tour.

In the summer of 2012, lead singer Stza and the Irish ska-punk band Chewing on Tinfoil formed The Choking Victim Show, which performed Choking Victim songs on tour throughout the UK, Ireland, and France.

Choking Victim has continued to play sporadic concerts worldwide between 2014 and 2017. Prior to 2017 these were one-off events, but, in 2017, they undertook their first tour in over a decade.

=== Legacy ===
In addition to Leftöver Crack and INDK, Choking Victim also spawned Public Serpents, Morning Glory and the Crack Rock Steady 7. Choking Victim have reformed for a few dates in the UK and Europe as The Choking Victim Show with Stza, Sascha, Alec and Ezra.

== Members ==
(1992–1993)	Stza – vocals, guitar; Sascha Scatter – bass; John Dolan – drums
(1993–1994)	Stza – vocals, guitar; Sascha Scatter – bass; Skwert – drums and vocals	Crack Rock Steady Demo (1992); Crack Rock Steady 7" (1993)
(1995–1996)	Stza – vocals, guitar; Alec Baillie – bass; Skwert – drums and vocals	Squatta's Paradise 7" (1996)
(1996)	Stza – vocals, guitar; Shayne Webb – bass; Skwert – drums and vocals
(1996)	Stza – vocals, guitar; Alec Baillie – bass; Skwert – drums and vocals
(1996–1998)	Stza – vocals, guitar; Shayne Webb – bass; Skwert – drums
(1998–1999)	Stza – vocals, guitar; Ezra – guitar; Shayne – bass; Skwert – drums	No Gods, No Managers (1999)
(Nov. 2000)	Stza – vocals, guitar; Ezra – guitar; Alec Baillie – bass; Skwert – drums
(2005–2006)	Stza – vocals, guitar; Sascha Scatter – bass; John Dolan – drums

- Scott "Stza" Sturgeon – vocals, guitar (1992–1999, 2000, 2005–2006, 2016–)
- Sascha "Scatter" DuBrul – bass (1992–1994, 2005–2006)
- John Dolan – drums (1992–1993, 2005–2006)
- Skwert – drums (1993–1999, 2000, 2016–)
- Alec Baillie – bass (1995–1996, 1996, 2000, 2016–2020; died 2020)
- Shayne Webb – bass (1996, 1996–1999)
- Ezra Kire – guitar (1998–1999, 2000)

== Discography ==
=== Albums ===
- No Gods, No Managers (1999)

=== EPs ===
- Crack Rock Steady EP (1994) 2x1000 pressed
- Squatta's Paradise (1996) 2x1000 pressed
- Victim Comes Alive (1998) 1000 pressed

=== Demos ===
- Crack Rock Steady Demo (2000)

=== Compilation albums ===
- Crack Rock Steady EP/Squatta's Paradise Split CD (2000)
- Songs in the Key of Lice – A Tribute to Choking Victim (2002) (various artists)
- A Tribute to Choking Victim (2008) (various artists)
- Load Yer Pipes: A Folk-Punk Tribute to Choking Victim (2015) (various artists)

=== Live albums ===
- Christmas with the Victim (2005)
- Live 9/11 2005 (2005)

=== Compilation appearances ===
- Wicked City Soundtrack – 1998, Velvel Records ("Fuck America")
- Give 'Em the Boot – 1997, Hellcat Records ("Infested")
- Give 'Em the Boot II – 1999, Hellcat Records ("Crack Rock Steady")
- Ska Sucks – 1998, Liberation Records ("Suicide (a better way)")
- Smash Ignorance Up – 1998, Possible Problem Records ("Money")
- Skanarchy III – 1997, Elevator Records ("Born to Die")
- Picklemania NYC – 1995, Riot Records ("500 Channels")
- Finding a Voice: A Benefit for Humans – 1999 Repetitively Futile Records ("Sweet Dreams")

== See also ==
- Leftöver Crack
- No Commercial Value
- F-Minus
- Star Fucking Hipsters
