= Deadline (Leftöver Crack and Citizen Fish album) =

Studio album by Citizen Fish / Leftöver Crack
- Released: March 6, 2007
- Recorded: January 2004 (songs 1–6)
- Genre: Punk rock, ska punk
- Label: Alternative Tentacles/Fat Wreck Chords

Citizen Fish chronology
What Time We On? (2006)	Deadline (2007)	Goods (2011)

Leftöver Crack chronology
Fuck World Trade (2004)	Deadline (2007)	Constructs of the State (2015)

Deadline is a split album released in 2007 on Alternative Tentacles Records and Fat Wreck Chords. The album features 15 songs from the 2 bands, Leftöver Crack and Citizen Fish. Each band covers two songs. Citizen Fish covers "Money" by Choking Victim, and "Clear Channel (Fuck Off!)" by Leftöver Crack. Leftöver Crack covers "Supermarket Song" by Citizen Fish, and "Reasons for Existence" by The Subhumans.

This album has cameos from Dave Dictor from MDC on the Intro song for the Leftöver Crack portion of the record, and vocals from Jello Biafra on Leftöver Crack's "Baby-Punchers".

== Reception ==
Allmusic writer Corey Apar gave the album four stars, stating "The bleeding urgency that both bands discharge with such directed force and street-level ferocity is truly refreshing...Deadline is surprisingly still incredibly accessible and even poppy." Chris Moran of Punknews.org gave it three and a half stars, calling it "a pleasant piece of punk history". Ty Trumbull, writing foe Exclaim!, viewed it as "a good example of what a split record should be: two bands that, while not completely dissimilar, each bring something different to the table." Andrew Miller for Alternative Press, awarded it three stars, stating that the album "confirms the genre's continued vitality and vigilance".

== Track listing ==
1. Citizen Fish - "Working on the Inside" (Dick Lukas) – 2:43
2. Citizen Fish - "Money" – (Choking Victim cover) – 2:01
3. Citizen Fish - "Meltdown" (Lukas) – 2:43
4. Citizen Fish - "Getting Used to It" (Lukas) – 2:30
5. Citizen Fish - "Back to Square One" (Lukas) – 3:00
6. Citizen Fish - "Join The Dots" (Lukas) – 3:08
7. Citizen Fish - "Clear Channel (Fuck Off!)" – (Leftöver Crack cover) – 2:30
8. Leftöver Crack - "L.Ö.C Intro (B.D.C)" - (Featuring Dave Dictor of Millions of Dead Cops) (Ara Crack, Frank DeGeneric, Stza) – 0:57
9. Leftöver Crack - "Baby-Punchers" – (Featuring Jello Biafra) (Crack, DeGeneric, Stza) – 3:29
10. Leftöver Crack - "Genocidal Tendencies" (Brad Logan, Stza) – 3:22
11. Leftöver Crack - "...And Out Comes the N-Bomb!" (Crack, DeGeneric, Stza) – 2:13
12. Leftöver Crack - "Life Causes Cancer" (Crack, DeGeneric, Stza) – 2:41
13. Leftöver Crack - "World War 4" (Ezra Kire, Stza) – 4:03
14. Leftöver Crack - "Supermarket Song" – (Citizen Fish cover) – 2:15
15. Leftöver Crack - "Reason for Existence" – (Subhumans cover) – 2:20

== Personnel ==
- Naren Rauch Atomic – Engineer, Assistant
- Jello Biafra – Vocals on Baby-Punchers
- Alec Crack "Shit Boat" – Bass
- Ara Crack "Slacka" – Drums
- Scott Sturgeon "Stza" – Guitar, Keyboards, Vocals, Producer, Mixing
- Dave "Knucklehead" Dictor – Vocals on L.Ö.C Intro (B.D.C)
- Alan Douches – Mastering
- Rik Dowding – Engineer
- Eric Drooker – Artwork
- Kristen Ferrell – Logo
- Fly – Artwork
- Jasper – Bass, Vocals, Artwork
- Ezra Kire "Way Way" – Guitar, Keyboards, Vocals
- Brad Logan – Guitar, Vocals
- Dick Lucas – Cover Painting
- Jamie McMann – Producer, Engineer, Mixing
