= White Wives =

American punk rock band

- Origin: Pittsburgh, Pennsylvania, United States
- Genres: Punk rock
- Years active: 2010–present
- Label: Adeline Records
- Members: Roger Harvey; Chris "2" Barker; Chris Head; Tyler Kweder; Chris Stowe; Josh Massie
- Past members: Max Gregor; Andy Tomaskovic; Maxx Gregg; Chris Wharton

White Wives is an American punk rock band from Pittsburgh, Pennsylvania. The band, composed of members from other Pittsburgh bands including Anti-Flag, The Code, Dandelion Snow and American Armada, was created in the summer of 2010. The band released their first EP, Situationists EP, through Lock and Key Collective in February 2011, and followed up in June with their debut full-length, Happeners, released on Adeline Records.

== Band members ==
- Roger Lawrence Harvey - Lead vocals/guitar (2010–present)
- Chris "#2" Barker - Lead vocals/guitar (2010–present)
- Chris Head - Lead guitar (2010–present)
- Tyler Kweder - Drums (2010–present)
- Chris Stowe - Bass guitar (2011–present)
- Josh Massie - Keys/trumpet (2011–present)

== Discography ==
=== Albums ===
- Happeners (2011)

=== Singles/EPs ===
- Situationists EP (2011)
- "Indian Summer" 7" (2011)
- Live at 222 Ormsby (2012)
- Howls for Sade (2013)
- Self Titled 7" (2013)
