= Red Lights Flash =

Austrian punk rock band

Red Lights Flash was an Austrian punk band from Graz, Austria.

The band was formed in 1997. They have political lyrics and play melodic-punk. Red Lights Flash was the first European band that signed a contract with the punk label A-F Records. They split in October 2010, having played their last shows at the Vans Of The Wall Music Night.

AllMusic noted about the band's third studio album, "Free is strictly for political punk fans, but it's a solid American debut for a band with several equally fine European releases to its credit."

== Discography ==
- 1999 Stop When... (Remedy Records)
- 2001 And Time Goes By (Household Name Records of London, Rise or Rust Records)
- 2005 Free (A-F Records)
- 2009 For Your Safety
