= Intro5pect =

American electropunk band

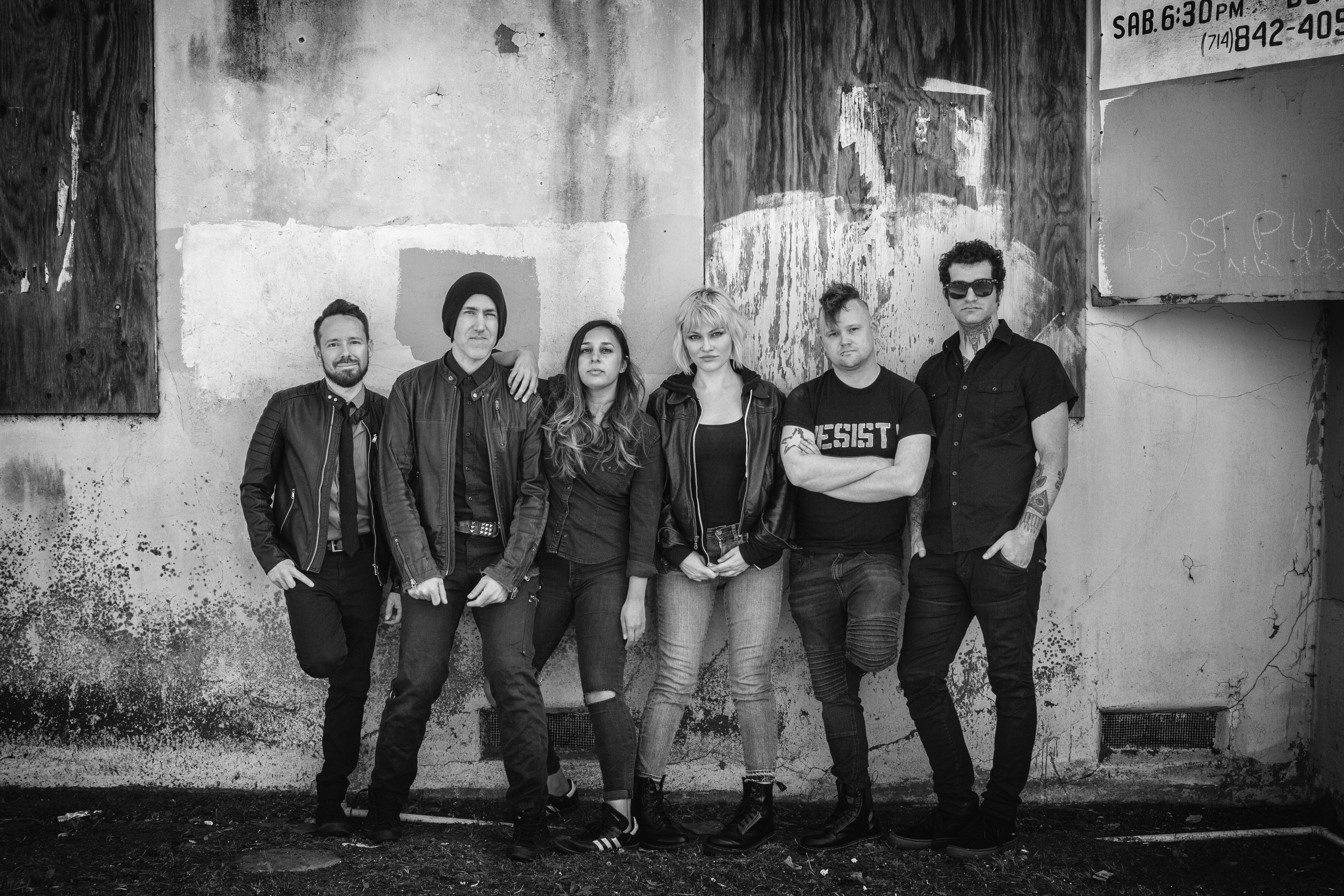

Background information
- Origin: Orange County, California, U.S.
- Genres: Electropunk
- Years active: 1997–present
- Labels: Blacknoise; A-F Records; Geykido Comet Records
- Members: Dani (vocals); Dave (vocals, guitar); Chris (guitar); Sara (keyboard); LandonHell (bass); Donny (drums)
- Past members: Gregg Armen (bass, 2003–2008); Nate Hansen (bass, 2000–2003)
- Website: Facebook account

Intro5pect is an American political electropunk band from Southern California.

The band was officially formed in 1997 as a reaction to the apparent commercialization of the punk genre. Their first demo was released in 1998 and their first official release came in 1999 when newly founded indie label Geykido Comet Records released the band's song "Education" as a limited-edition 7-inch vinyl.

In 2002 the band signed to Anti-Flag's label A-F Records, which released their self-titled full-length album in the spring of 2003. The album received a rating of five out of five from Punknews.org.

In June 2007, Intro5pect toured the United Kingdom and Mainland Europe. Around this time the band's new demo "War At Home" was spot-played several times by BBC Radio 1 DJ Mike Davies on his punk rock show 'The Lockup'.

On October 16, 2007, the EP Realpolitik was released, featuring Stza from Leftöver Crack on vocals.

In the summer of 2008, the band embarked on their second tour of the United Kingdom alongside Moral Dilemma and this time played several headline shows at such venues as the Camden Underworld, finishing the tour at White Rabbit in Plymouth with a special rendition of rock and roll featuring Craig Temple of Moral Dilemma on guitar and Joey Blues of Kill Youth Culture on mandolin. Further support came from Mike Davies who this time had the band in to do a live session at the Maida Vale Studios. The show was broadcast the following week on BBC Radio 1.

Upon returning home from this tour, the band and bassist Gregg parted ways due to creative differences. After an extensive search LandonHell was drafted in to fill the void.

In a 2009 interview with PunkCDSampler, Sara declared that "The new album sounds like the self-titled one, to the extreme". The EP Record Profits was released later that summer.

On February 24, 2019, the band performed for the first time since 2011 at the Observatory in Santa Ana with the addition of new singer Dani. "Pro-Control", the first new track since 2009's "Record Profits", was released on December 6, 2019.

== Discography ==
- 1999: "Education" 7"
- 2003: Self-titled full-length album
- 2007: Realpolitik!
- 2009: Record Profits

== Compilations ==
- 1999: We're Not Generation X
- 2000: You Call This Music?! Volume 1
- 2001: Your Machinery Is Too Much for Me 7"
- 2002: You Call This Music?! Volume 2
- 2002: Dropping Food on Their Heads Is Not Enough: Benefit for RAWA
- 2003: Go Kart MP300
- 2005: This Just In... Benefit for Indy Media
- 2005: Voices of Discontent
- 2008: Chemical X DVD (music video compilation)

== See also ==
- A-F Records
