= Never Rest in Peace =

Studio album by Star Fucking Hipsters
- Released: October 20, 2009
- Recorded: 2009
- Genre: ska-punk, anarcho-punk
- Length: 30:03
- Label: Alternative Tentacles
- Producer: Sturgeon F. Hipster, Howie Weinberg

Star Fucking Hipsters chronology
| Until We're Dead (2008) | Never Rest in Peace (2009) | From the Dumpster to the Grave (2011) |

Never Rest In Peace is the second studio album by ska-punk/anarcho-punk band Star Fucking Hipsters. It officially released on Tuesday, October 20, 2009 on Alternative Tentacles, although those who purchased the album on the Alternative Tentacles website received the album before the official release date.

== Singles ==
The band released a video for the song "3000 Miles Away" which features Ethan Suplee of American History X, Boy Meets World, and My Name is Earl fame.

== Track listing ==
All songs written by Star Fucking Hipsters except "Look Who's Talking Now!" written by Sturg and Brandon Chevalier-Koling, and "Heaven" written by the Degenerics.

| # | Title | Length |
|---|---|---|
| 1. | "Vol. II" | 0:15 |
| 2. | "3000 Miles Away" | 3:05 |
| 3. | "Look Who's Talking Now!" | 2:37 |
| 4. | "Design" | 1:41 |
| 5. | "Church and Rape" | 3:04 |
| 6. | "The Civilization Show" | 2:46 |
| 7. | "Allergic II Peoples" | 0:27 |
| 8. | "Dreams are Dead" | 2:53 |
| 9. | "Heaven" | 2:26 |
| 10. | "Banned From The Land" | 1:21 |
| 11. | "Severance Pay" | 2:07 |
| 12. | "S.F.H. Theme" | 2:38 |
| 13. | "Never Rest In Peace" | 4:37 |

== Personnel ==
- Nico de Gaillo: Vocals
- Scott Sturgeon: Vocals, Guitar
- Frank Piegaro: Guitar
- Chris Pothier: Bass
- Alex Charpentier: drums
- Brian "Pnut" Kozuch: drums

=== Additional musicians ===
- Roberto Miguel: horns
- Craig Fu Yong: additional vocals
- Jasper Peterson: additional vocals
- Dick Lucas: additional vocals
- Bill Cashman: background vocals
- Bryan Alien: background vocals
- Fran Araya: background vocals
- Bryan Kienlen: background vocals
- Mike Dreg: background vocals
- Canadian Jay: background vocals
- Filthy Phil: background vocals
- Lil Jil: background vocals

=== Production ===
- Ryan Jones: mixing
- Howard Weinberg: mastering
