= Until We're Dead =

Studio album by Star Fucking Hipsters
- Released: September 30, 2008
- Recorded: 2008
- Genre: ska-punk, anarcho-punk
- Length: 45:00
- Label: Fat Wreck Chords
- Producer: Sturgeon F. Hipster, Fat Mike

Star Fucking Hipsters chronology
Until We're Dead (2008)	Never Rest in Peace (2009)

Until We're Dead is the debut studio album by ska-punk/anarcho-punk band Star Fucking Hipsters. It was released in 2008 on Fat Wreck Chords.

== Background ==
Leftöver Crack vocalist Stza and drummer Brandon Chevalier-Kolling were the original creators of the punk rock supergroup Star Fucking Hipsters. The band went on hiatus following Brandon’s untimely death. Stza eventually reunited with another former Leftöver Crack member, drummer Ara Babajian, along with friend Frank Piegaro of The Degenerics to reform the group. With the addition of female vocalist Nico de Gaillo of Another Dying Democracy and bassist Yula Beeri of World Inferno Friendship Society they crafted their full-length album in early 2008. According to Stza, the album was to be originally titled "Allergic To People". The album was recorded and mixed by Ryan Jones at The Wild Arctic in Queens, NY and additionally mixed by Stza and Jamie McMann at Motor Studios in San Francisco, California during the early half of June that year. It was eventually released by independent record label Fat Wreck Chords on September 30, 2008.

== Singles ==
The album has spawned a video for the song "Two Cups of Tea".

== Track listing ==
#	Title	Length
1.	"Introducción a los Hipsters"	0:18
2.	"Until We're Dead"	3:57
3.	"Immigrants & Hypocrites"	2:43
4.	"Two Cups Of Tea"	3:34
5.	"Empty Lives"	2:51
6.	"Snitch to the Suture"	2:37
7.	"Only Sleep"	5:12
8.	"9/11 Was (An Inside Joke)"	3:10
9.	"The Path is Paved"	2:21
10.	"Zombie Christ"	3:00
11.	"This Wal-Mart Life"	2:25
12.	"Broken"	4:33
13.	"Death or Fight"	8:08

- "Death or Fight" includes a reprised segment of "Immigrants & Hypocrites" after the end of the main song.

== Personnel ==
- Nico de Gaillo- vocals
- Sturgeon F. Hipster- guitar, vocals
- Frank Piegaro, guitar
- Yula Beeri, bass
- Ara Babajian, drums

=== Additional musicians ===
- Franz Nicolay- piano, organ, accordion
- Cara Wick- violins
- Darius Koski- piano, accordion
- Chad Mo- clarinets
- Joey Cape- vocals

=== Production ===
- Ryan Jones- mixing
- Alan Douches- mastering
- Fat Mike- production
- Stza- production
