= No Gods, No Managers =

No Gods / No Managers

Studio album by Choking Victim
- Released: March 30, 1999
- Recorded: March – April 1998
- Genres: Ska punk, anarcho-punk, crust punk
- Length: 41:40
- Label: Hellcat
- Producer: Mike Trujillo

Professional ratings
Review scores
| Source | Rating |
|---|---|
| Allmusic | 3/5 stars |
| Courier News | 3.5/4 stars |
| Flipside | (unfavorable) |
| Fracture | (favorable) |
| LouderSound | (favorable) |
| Melody Maker | 0/5 stars |
| PunkNews.org | 4.5/5 stars |
| Sputnikmusic | 5/5 stars |

No Gods / No Managers is the only studio album and final release by American skapunk band Choking Victim. The album was released in 1999 through Hellcat/Epitaph Records and re-released on LP format by Epitaph in 2004. Being the sole full-length album of Choking Victim, as they broke up during the recording of the album, it became hugely popular in the punk scene. It inspired many nascent bands, and the band members of Choking Victim went on to form other bands, most notably Leftöver Crack.

The tone of the album is largely dark and pessimistic, with lyrics and artwork containing Satanic imagery. The cover does not contain a barcode, in accordance with their staunch anti-capitalist message, and is decorated with various satanic and anti-Christian symbols. However, a later pressing includes a barcode on the back cover. The album's title is an interpretation of the anarchist phrase/motto "No gods, no masters".

The quotations heard on several tracks are recordings of Michael Parenti, a leftist political writer.

The songs "Suicide", "Fucked Reality", "Money" and "Hate Yer State" had all appeared on the band's previous extended play releases. However, the versions featured on this album are different recordings to those included on their EPs.

== Critical reception ==
Robert Makin of the Courier News highly praised the album, describing it as an essential release and rating it 3.5 stars out of four, while PunkNews.org writer Pete Vincelli, in a retrospective review, said that Choking Victim were continuing the legacy of Operation Ivy by shaking up a tired scene and Gallows guitarist Laurent Barnard claimed it was a "masterpiece". Daniel Booth, writing in Melody Maker, was more critical, rating it 0 stars and saying that it sounded like "1,000 dung-beetles gargling their own shit".

== Track listing ==
All tracks are written by Choking Victim, except for tracks 9–11, written by Choking Victim and No Commercial Value.

| No. | Title | Length |
|---|---|---|
| 1. | "500 Channels" | 2:40 |
| 2. | "In Hell" | 2:05 |
| 3. | "Crack Rock Steady" | 3:04 |
| 4. | "Suicide (A Better Way)" | 2:53 |
| 5. | "In My Grave" | 2:48 |
| 6. | "Fucked Reality" | 2:28 |
| 7. | "Money" | 3:32 |
| 8. | "Hate Yer State" | 2:49 |
| 9. | "Fuck America" | 2:19 |
| 10. | "War Story" | 2:53 |
| 11. | "Five-Finger Discount" | 2:32 |
| 12. | "Praise to the Sinners" | 2:11 |
| 13. | "Living the Laws" (Track ends at 4:10 with hidden track "Ska Rock Steady" starting at 4:40) | 9:19 |
| Total length: | | 41:40 |

("Money", "Fuck America", and "Praise to the Sinners" contain audio of Michael Parenti)

== Personnel ==
- Musicians:
  - Stza – guitar and vocals
  - Ezra – guitar and vocals
  - Shayne – bass and vocals
  - Skwert – drums and vocals
  - Tommy Trujillo – flamenco guitar
- Mike Trujillo (producer, mixing)
- Choking Victim (producer, mixing)
- Geoff Sykes (mastering)
- Mike Dy (mixing assistant)
- Phil Kaffel (engineer)
- John Srebalus (assistant engineer)
- Eric Drooker (artwork)
