= The Code (band) =

American ska-punk band

- Origin: Pittsburgh, Pennsylvania, U.S.
- Genres: Punk
- Years active: 2000–present
- Labels: A-F, Jumpstart
- Members: Marcdefiant, Seth R, Poison Jay, Beau B., Chuck V.
- Past members: Little Roger, Fat Jonny (Jon H.), Jesse Young, Andy T

The Code is an American ska-punk rock band from Pittsburgh, Pennsylvania. The band released their first full-length CD on A-F Records, which they followed up with a split with Whatever It Takes. They have also toured with bands such as Rise Against, Against Me!, Bouncing Souls, Pipedown and Anti-Flag. Their most recent release is an EP, Rhetoric of Reason, released on Jumpstart Records. The band announced their break up in August 2006. On July 2, 2007, The Code reunited for a show in Lawrenceville.

The Code played a show with The Suicide Machines on May 25, 2018 in Lawrenceville along with Worlds Scariest Police Chases and announced that they were working on new material, and played a newly written song.

In Anti-Flag's EP, A Benefit for Victims of Violent Crime they have a song called "Marcdefiant" about lead singer of The Code. A demo version was first released as a bonus track on Anti-Flag's "For Blood And Empire" LP.

In April 2019, The Code played a series of Midwest shows with We Are the Union and Dollar Signs. They're currently working on a new record.

== Discography ==
- Alert, Aware, Involved (2002) A-F Records
- The Code/Whatever it Takes Split (2003) A-F Records
- Rhetoric of Reason (2004) Jumpstart Records
