= Leftöver Crack =

American punk rock band

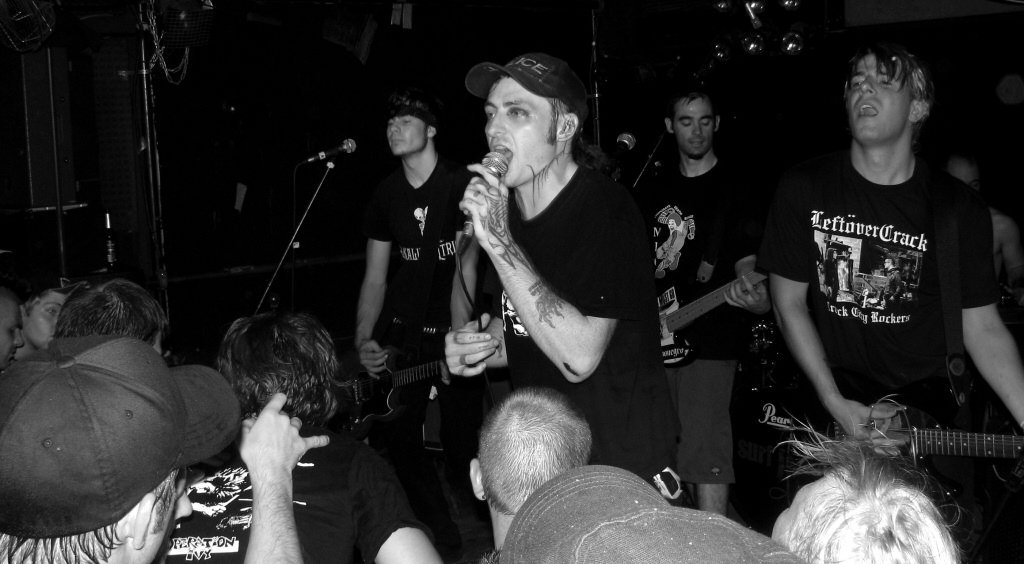
- Leftöver Crack performing in Cologne in 2006

Background information
- Also known as: Crack Rock Steady 7
- Origin: Alphabet City, Manhattan, New York, U.S.
- Genres: Crust punk; hardcore punk; ska punk; crack rock steady
- Years active: 1998–present
- Labels: SBÄM, Fat Wreck Chords, Alternative Tentacles, Household Name, Hellcat, BANKSHOT!
- Members: Stza; Tibbie X Skunk Chellovek; Jon Yi; Ethan Nickles; Marc Cody
- Past members: Brad Logan; Alec Baillie †; Ezra Kire; Ara Babajian; Chris Mann; Amery Smith; Tom "Jangles" Knox; Joey "Gunner" Hunt; Brandon Chevalier-Kolling (Brandon Possible) †; Austin Hotchkiss; Harrison Rolfe; Reade Wolcott; Ian McDougall; Lance Michael; Donny Morris; Al Rosenberg; Sandra Malak; Kate Coysh
- Website: Leftöver Crack

Leftöver Crack is an American punk rock band formed in 1998, following the breakup of Choking Victim. Leftöver Crack spans several different music genres including hardcore punk, ska, and crust punk. They write mostly political lyrics of a radical leftist nature, opposing religion, capitalism, and authority. Members of Leftöver Crack reside in the C-Squat on 155 Avenue C on the Lower East Side of Manhattan. Natives of New York City, band members have a well-documented history of back-and-forth conflict with the NYPD which precedes the band's formation. The name "Leftöver Crack" is explained by Stza as being "an oxymoron", based on the idea that crack cocaine addicts are known for vigorous use and are unlikely to have any "leftover" crack.

== History ==
=== 1998-2000: Beginnings ===
Formed around the same time as the breakup of Choking Victim, Leftöver Crack was initially an outlet for Choking Victim frontman Scott Sturgeon a.k.a. Stza to release songs that, for one reason or another, were never recorded by Choking Victim and which he claims are the "Leftover songs"—hence the name. For almost two years following the band's formation, the band consisted almost solely of Stza, who recorded many of the songs that would feature on later releases onto a four-track recorder whilst searching for band members. The band eventually solidified (albeit temporarily) around a lineup of Scott "Stza" Sturgeon (vocals, additional guitars), Brad Logan of F-Minus (guitar), Alec Baillie (bass, previously of Choking Victim), Mike Trujillo of Blindsided (guitar) and Amery "AWOL" Smith (drums, previously of Suicidal Tendencies and the Beastie Boys).

Now a complete band, Leftöver Crack proceeded to record several songs with the full lineup, including "Rock the 40 Oz.", "Crack City Rockers" and "The Good, the Bad & the Leftöver Crack"—effectively the band's "theme song". Five of these songs were later included on the band's first release, Rock the 40 Oz. 7-inch EP, which was released by Bankshot! Records on March 8, 2000.

=== 2001: Signing to Hellcat Records ===
After contributing the song "Crack City Rockers" to the second installment of Hellcat Records' Give 'em the Boot compilation series, the band was signed to the label, initially being contracted to produce three albums for Hellcat. The band agreed, and promptly began recording songs for their first full-length album, tentatively titled Shoot the Kids at School.

Hellcat Records refused to release the album, due to concerns over the album's controversial title, artwork, and subject matter (especially regarding the recent Columbine shootings). The band eventually relented and changed the album's title, art, and track listing, under the promise that they would be released from their contract afterward as a result. The album was eventually released under the title of Mediocre Generica, a sly attack at Hellcat Records, who Stza claimed wanted a "mediocre, generic" album compared to the original. The album was released on September 11, 2001.

At this point, the band now consisted of Stza (vocals, additional guitars), Alec (bass), Ezra Kire, and Ara Babajian from NYC ska band Agent 99, and later The Slackers, on drums.

=== 2002-2003: Split from Hellcat Records and new music ===
As a result of legal disputes with Hellcat Records, the band was effectively left in limbo for approximately two years, unable to leave their current label, yet also unable to sign to another—as well as being unable to release any new material under the name of Leftöver Crack. However, the band did manage to bend the rules of their contract slightly, releasing a split EP with F-Minus as the Crack Rock Steady Seven—effectively Leftöver Crack working under aliases with additional musicians. The EP was titled Baby Jesus, Sliced up in the Manger and was released on November 27, 2003.

In February 2003, the band began to record the songs that they had written and developed over the last three years with esteemed engineer Steve Albini, a majority of which would see a release on their second album. After recording two final songs that winter, and having finally been dropped from Hellcat Records' roster, the band opted to release the song the following the year as the Fuck World Trade demo for the consideration of independent punk record labels. Around the same time, the band were approached by renowned underground punk rock figure and ex-Dead Kennedys frontman Jello Biafra, and consequently signed to his Alternative Tentacles record label.

=== 2004-2006: Fuck World Trade and hiatus ===
On August 30, 2004, Leftöver Crack released their second album, Fuck World Trade, on Alternative Tentacles (Household Name Records in the UK).

The album was banned in multiple chain stores such as Wal-Mart, Best Buy and Music Land due to the album's controversial name and subject matter—as well as the front cover, which features George W. Bush, Dick Cheney, and Rudy Giuliani (Tony Blair on the UK release) causing the World Trade Center attacks.

The album also displayed a greater degree of artistic freedom from the band, featuring longer songs, a wider range of instrumentation (such as strings, synthesizers and double-bass drumming) and a larger amount of genre experimentation—featuring elements of death metal, classical music and folk music along with the band's trademark combination of anarcho-punk and ska. The album also included several guest appearances, including Chris Head, Justin Sane, and Chris No. 2 of Anti-Flag, as well as a collaboration with The World/Inferno Friendship Society.

The band took an indefinite hiatus after the death of drummer Brandon Possible at the end of 2004. Stza spent the interim playing Leftöver Crack and Choking Victims songs by himself at a few solo acoustic shows. Ezra spent time writing songs for his band Morning Glory. Leftöver Crack began touring again in the summer of 2005, including some dates with Citizen Fish and The World/Inferno Friendship Society, as well as playing dates in October 2005 in California after the Wasted Fest was canceled. The so-called Crack Rock Steady Seven also embarked on a small European tour in November; however, this incarnation consisted of only Stza and The Infested, in some cases billed as the "Crack Steady Rockers".

=== 2006-2007: Return and split with Citizen Fish ===
Blacknoise Records released a four-way split entitled The Kids Are Gonna Pay... in March 2006 with Leftöver Crack contributing 1 new song, "Look Who's Talking Now". Other bands on the split included Morning Glory, F-Minus, and Bent Outta Shape. The 7-inch was limited to 1000 copies on white vinyl and is now sold out. The first 100 included limited-edition patches designed by Brad Logan's wife Kristen, and some included an insert.

On October 31, 2006, Fat Wreck Chords released a 7-inch split single with UK ska punk band Citizen Fish, to which Leftöver Crack contributed the new song "Baby Punchers". To support the release, the two bands joined with other Fat Wreck bands, The Sainte Catherines and Dead to Me, and went on a U.S. tour. The full-length split with Citizen Fish, entitled Deadline, was released on March 6, 2007, with Fat Wreck Chords releasing the CD version and Alternative Tentacles releasing the vinyl version. The album featured seven songs from each band (plus an intro for Leftöver Crack's side), as well as featuring three songs originally intended to be released by Stza's newer band, Star Fucking Hipsters. 1103 copies were released on white vinyl.

=== 2007-2011: Departure of Ezra and tour of Australia ===
Following the release and subsequent touring in support of Deadline, Leftöver Crack gradually became less prominent as members (namely Stza and Ezra) focused on other musical projects—such as Star Fucking Hipsters and Morning Glory, respectively. Although still regularly playing shows, the band effectively took a backseat, especially as Star Fucking Hipsters released their first two albums, Until We're Dead and Never Rest in Peace.

Towards the end of 2009, it was announced that longtime guitarist and backing vocalist Ezra had left the band. Although initially appearing to be an amicable departure, this later escalated when Stza effectively began an online "feud" with Ezra, accusing him of being a liar and drug addict.

In November 2009, Leftöver Crack toured Australia and New Zealand for the first time in their career. However, the lineup for all of the shows consisted of Stza, guitarist Frank Piegaro (of Star Fucking Hipsters/Degenerics) and two Australians filling in: Alex Flamsteed (Hereafter) and Chris Cox (Phalanx).

Following the Australian tour, Stza stated at a house show in West Auckland that Leftöver Crack would most probably be inactive in the future, much like Choking Victim before them. This coincided with the increased rate of activity from Star Fucking Hipsters, which has become his main creative outlet as of late.

In December 2010, Leftöver Crack announced that they were playing three shows. Returning to the lineup was Ezra, implying that the feud between him and Stza may have been resolved.

In January 2011, it was announced through their Facebook page that Leftöver Crack would do a West Coast tour in February and an East Coast tour in March of that year. They would also play a small UK tour in August 2011, including the Reading and Leeds festivals.

=== 2015-2016: Constructs of the State ===
On July 20, 2015, Scott Sturgeon confirmed Leftöver Crack had finished their third album, Constructs of the State. It was released on November 27, 2015, through Fat Wreck Chords, and featured guest appearances from Days N' Daze, Mischief Brew, The Bouncing Souls, Intro5pect, Blackbird Raum, Penny Rimbaud and Jesse Michaels.

On May 25, 2016, the band released a music video for the song "Bedbugs & Beyond" courtesy of Shibby Pictures.

=== 2024: Abandon The Precincts ===
On March 6, 2024, the band released "Shootacide" and announced the release of a new album titled Abandon the Precincts, as well as an upcoming tour.

=== 2025: Singles, Tours, and Features ===
On March 10, 2025, the band announced their official signing to SBÄM Records. The band is currently recording new music and will be reissuing all of their previous albums, with the exception of their debut LP, Mediocre Generica (Hellcat/Epitaph). On April 18, 2025, they released another single to the buildup of their Abandon the Precincts LP, entitled "White Guilt Atrocity Quilt", which included B-side "Brad Sabbath", both featuring their new vocalist, Tibbie-X, on them. On April 24, they released a music video to this single shot at Bar Freda in Ridgewood, Queens and C-Squat. On May 23, Stza and Tibbie-X made an appearance under the band's name on Turtle's Plan by Henry Thugsworth & The Severinator, being shown both in the music video and Stza getting a verse in the song.

== Venue bans, criminal records and visa restriction ==
Leftöver Crack has been banned from performing in many venues in New York City, such as ABC No Rio and the Knitting Factory. However, they still play at banned venues under a different name, Crack Rock Steady Seven or individually as solo acts. They regularly have trouble touring in certain countries, especially Canada, due to members having prior criminal records. They were denied entry into Canada for a tour scheduled at the end of 2007.

During a show in Boston, in August 2008, Stza angrily stated Leftöver Crack would never return to Boston; however, they played just outside of Boston on June 18, 2016. In 2006, after their show in Boise, Stza announced to a group of fans that they would never return. Subsequently, Boise was skipped in 2007, and Star Fucking Hipsters' 2010 Boise date was canceled a week or so after being posted; however, they returned to Boise in March 2011. In June 2016, Leftöver Crack was allowed entry into Canada; they played Amnesia Rockfest in Montebello, Quebec. However, many members were denied entry into Canada again in 2018.

== Members ==
Current members

- Stza – lead vocals, keys, guitar (1998–present)
- Skunk Chellovek – rhythm guitar, vocals (2023–present)
- Tibbie X – vocals (2024–present)
- Jon Yi – lead guitar, vocals (2024–present)
- Ethan Nickles – drums (2024–present)
- Marc Cody – bass, vocals (2024–present)

Former members

- Brandon Chevalier-Kolling (Brandon Possible) – drums (1998, 2004; died 2004)
- Brad Logan – guitar (1998–2000; 2004–2021)
- Mike Trujillo – guitar (1998–2000)
- Alec Baillie – bass (1998–2020; died 2020)
- Amery Smith – drums (1998–2000)
- Ezra Kire – guitar (2000–2012)
- Ara Babajian – drums (2000–2002, 2005–2007)
- JP Otto – drums (2002–2005)
- Donny Morris – drums (2015–2024)
- Chris Mann – guitar (2015–2019)
- Kate Coysh – vocals (2017–2024)
- Reade Wolcott - guitar (2018)
- Al Rosenberg – guitar (2019–2024)
- Sandra Malak – bass guitar (2021)
- Tom 'Jangles' Knox
- Joey "Gunner" Hunt
- Austin Hotchkiss
- Harrison Rolfe
- Lance Michael

== Discography ==
=== Studio albums ===
- Mediocre Generica (2001, Hellcat)
- Fuck World Trade (2004, Alternative Tentacles)
- Constructs of the State (2015, Fat Wreck)
- Abandon the Precincts (TBA)

=== EPs ===
- Rock the 40 Oz. (2000, Bankshot!)
- Shoot the Kids at School (2000)

=== Singles ===
- "Shootacide" (2024)
- "White Guilt Atrocity Quilt" (2025)

=== Compilation albums ===
- Rock the 40 Oz: Reloaded (2004, Bankshot!)
- Leftöver Leftöver Crack: The E-Sides and F-sides (2018, Fat Wreck Chords)

=== Split albums ===
- Baby Jesus Sliced Up in the Manger (as the Crack Rock Steady 7) (2004, Hell Bent)
- Deadline (split with Citizen Fish) (2006, Fat Wreck Chords)

=== Music videos ===
- "Rock the 40 Oz." (2002)
- "System Fucked" (2015)
- "Bedbugs and Beyond" (2016)
- "Shootacide" (2024)
- "White Guilt Atrocity Quilt" (2025)
- "Turtle's Plan" (2025)

=== Compilation album contributions ===
- "Crack City Rockers" on Give 'Em the Boot II (1999, Hellcat Records)
- "Nazi White Trash" on Punk Rawk Explosion #6 (2001, Punk Rawk)
- "Nazi White Trash" on Eat This! (2001, Eat Me! Records)
- "Atheist Anthem" on Give 'Em the Boot III (2002, Hellcat Records)
- "Rock The 40oz" on Go Kart vs. the Corporate Giant Vol. 3, Go Kart Records, 2002
- "So Ya Wanna Be A Cop?" on A-F Records Sampler (2003, A-F Records)
- "One Dead Cop" on Fueling the Flames of Revolution Vol. 3 (2003, A-F Records)
- "Operation: MOVE" and "Super Tuesday" on Against Police Injustice (2003, Non Commercial)
- "Muppet N.A.M.B.L.A" on Mass Destruction (2003, Bankshot Records)
- "Burn Them Prisons" on News (S) Hit'S September 04 (2004, Funtomias Records)
- "Drug Song" and "Nobody Is Free" on Riot Ska (2004, Beer Records)
- "Operation: M.O.V.E" on Breeding Disloyalty (2004, Household Name Records)
- "Life Is Pain" on Punk Rawk Explosion #18 (2005, Punk Rawk)
- "Via Sin Dios" on Rock Sound Speciale Punk Rock 21 (2005, Rock Sound)
- "World War 4" on X-Mas Bonus (2006, Fat Wreck)
- "Look Who's Talking Now" on The Kids Are Gonna Pay (2006, Blacknoise Records)
- "Burn Them Prisons" on Antifascist Action Worldwide Benefit Compilation I (2006, Siempre Contra)
- "Gang Control" on Stay Sick In '06 (2006, Alternative Tentacles)
- "And Out Comes The N Bomb" on Sonic Terror Surge 2007 (2007, Alternative Tentacles)
- "And Out Comes The N-Bomb" on Punk Rawk #36 (2007, Punk Rawk)
- "World War 4" on Fat Wreck Chords Presents: Land Of The Rising Floyd (2007, Fat Wreck Chords)
- "Gay Rude Boys Unite" on Rotten Schwuchtel Sampler – A Queer / Pro-Gay Punk & HC-Compilation (2008)
- "Gang Control" on Alternative Tentacles (2010, Pasazer)
- "Heroin or Suicide" on And You Call This Civilization? (2010, Pumpkin Records/Anarchistic Undertones)
- "Super Tuesday" on Compilation Ben Salad Prod 10 Ans Retrospective (2012, Ben Salad Prod)
- "Burn Them Prisons" on A Benefit Compilation In Love & Solidarity With Kostas Sakkas Volume 2 (2013, Pumpkin Records/Riot Ska Records)
- "Via Sin Dios" on Fat Gets Heavier (2015, Fat Wreck Chords)
- "The Lie of Luck" on Fat Music Vol. 8: Going Nowhere Fat (2015, Fat Wreck Chords)
- "The Lie of Luck" on Fat Music For Fest People Vol. V (2015, Fat Wreck Chords)
- "System Fucked" on Fat Music For Wrecked People - Groez Cruise 2016 (2016, Fat Wreck Chords)
- "Gay Rude Boys Unite (Live On The BBC)" on The Punknews.org Banned From The P.C. Mixtape (2017, Narmer Records)
- "Infested (The Lindane Conspiracy Part I" on Coaster (2018, Fat Wreck Chords, 2018.
- "Muppet Namblin'" on Fat Music for Fest People 8 (2018, Fat Wreck)

=== Live ===
- Live C-Squat 3/31/01 (2001)
- Straight Outta' Naples (2002)
- live at the stage @ Arnhem, Holland (2008)

=== Bootlegs ===
- Live in Reading (2001)
- Fuck World Trade Demo (2004)

=== Film ===
- Loren Cass (2007)

== See also ==
- F-Minus
- Choking Victim
- No Commercial Value
- Morning Glory
- C-Squat
- Star Fucking Hipsters
