= Morning Glory (band) =

American punk rock band

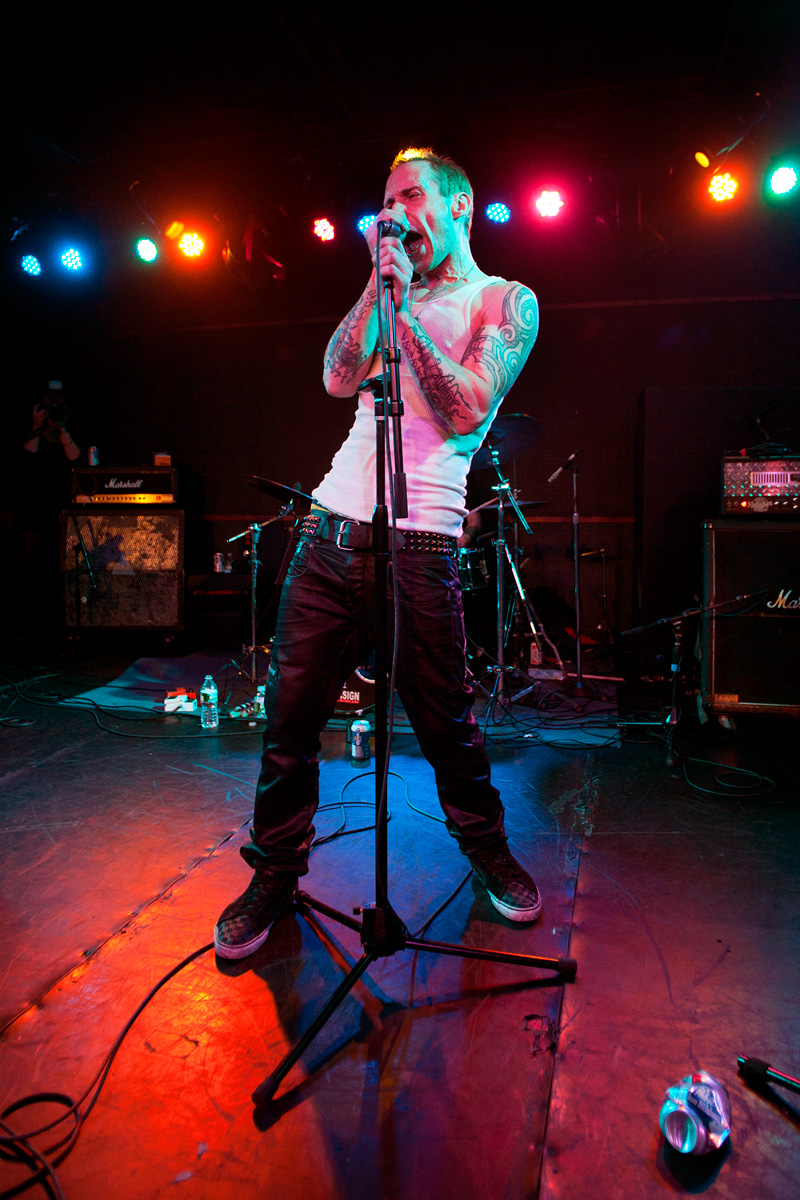
- Ezra Kire with Morning Glory at the Knitting Factory in 2010.

Background information
- Also known as: M. Glory
- Origin: New York, New York City
- Genre: Crack rock steady
- Years active: 2001 - Present
- Labels: Revolution Rock, Blacknoise, Fat Wreck, Buyback Records

Morning Glory is an American punk rock band from New York City. It was formed originally as a solo project by Ezra Kire in 2001 after his band Choking Victim disbanded in 1998.

According to a page on the Fat Wreck Chords website, the name for this band did not come from the flower of the same name, but rather from the fact that many of the songs were written during the morning by Kire.

== Discography ==
=== Albums ===
- This Is No Time ta Sleep (2001) – Revolution Rock Records
- The Suicide Singles (2001) – Revolution Rock Records
- The Whole World Is Watching (2003) – Blacknoise Records
- The Kids Are Gonna Pay... (2006) Split with Leftöver Crack, F-Minus and Bent Outta Shape – Blacknoise Records
- The Whole World Is Watching (Re-Issue with 3 new songs) (2007) – Blacknoise Records
- Poets Were My Heroes (2012) – Fat Wreck Chords
- War Psalms (2014) – Fat Wreck Chords

=== Other ===
- Born to December 7" (2013) – Fat Wreck Chords
- Always Alone (2013) Split EP with Off With Their Heads – Fat Wreck Chords
- Post War Psalms (2016) EP – Buyback Records

== Music videos ==
- "Born to December" (2013)
- "Punx Not Dead, I Am" (2014)
- "I Am Machine Gun" (2014)
