= ReelAbilities =

US film festival

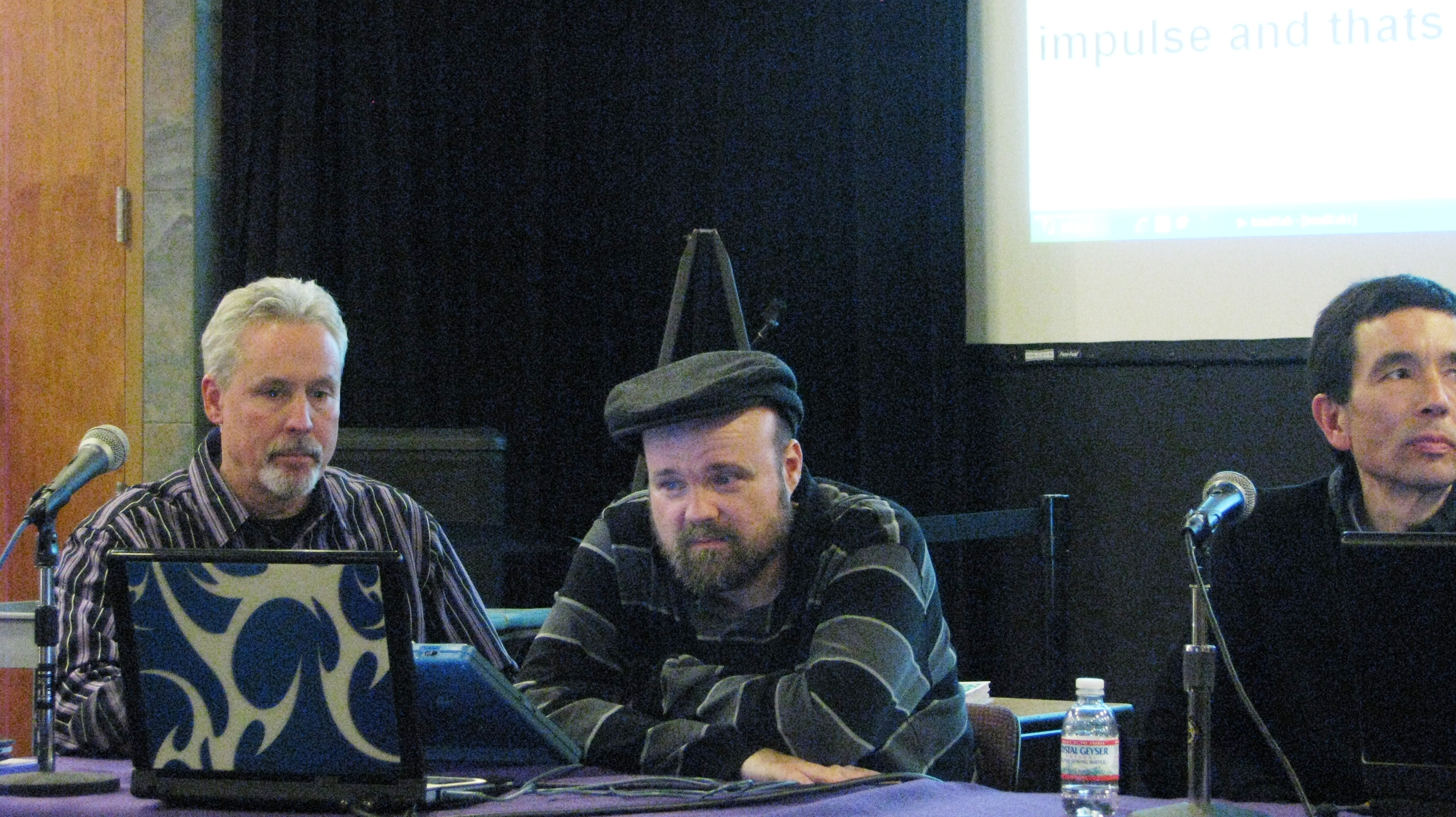
Tracy, a man with autism who stars in the documentary Wretches & Jabberers, participates in a Question and Answer session at the ReelAbilities Film Festival.

ReelAbilities is the United States' largest film festival dedicated to showcasing films by, or about, people with disabilities. It was founded by JCC Manhattan in New York City in 2007.

== Overview ==
The Festival's Co-directors are Isaac Zablocki and Ravit Turjeman. ReelAbilities strives to make the festival as fully accessible as possible. In 2012, it screened films in 23 locations in all five of New York City's boroughs. All films screened by the Festival are captioned. It is also "the only festival in New York that prints film programs in Braille and features audio descriptions for the blind".

In March 2015, the NY edition of the festival opened on the Intrepid Sea, Air and Space Museum and was featured for 7 days in 37 venues throughout the greater NY metropolitan area.

ReelAbilities is now a touring film festival throughout the United States. Cities on its itinerary include:

- Atlanta
- Bay Area
- Boston
- Columbus
- Cincinnati
- Chicago
- Greater D.C.
- Houston
- Minneapolis/St. Paul
- New Jersey
- New York City
- Philadelphia
- Pittsburgh
- Richmond, Virginia

== Programming ==
Disabilities of any kind are explored in the films in the ReelAbilities Film Festival programming. In 2012, films featured included disabilities such as autism, Down syndrome, cerebral palsy, blindness and mental health. ReelAbilities screens films from the United States as well as international films, including from countries such as Argentina, Australia, Belgium, Canada, China, Germany, and the United Kingdom.

According to Festival Director Isaac Zablocki, most of the films originate outside the United States:

...specifically in Europe, where there's traditionally a lot of smaller films and access to government funds. Lots of these films are amazing, and, best of all, we get to show premieres. Many of the films are embraced outside of the U.S., but we're often the first or only American festival to show these movies.

Jeff Remz, a communications and marketing manager of the Boston Jewish Film Festival, helped sponsor ReelAbilities in Boston in 2012. Remz says, "Disabilities don't know boundaries by way of country, ethnicity, religion, or community."

== See also ==
- Disability in the arts
- Disability in the media
