= Blackbird Raum =

American folk punk band

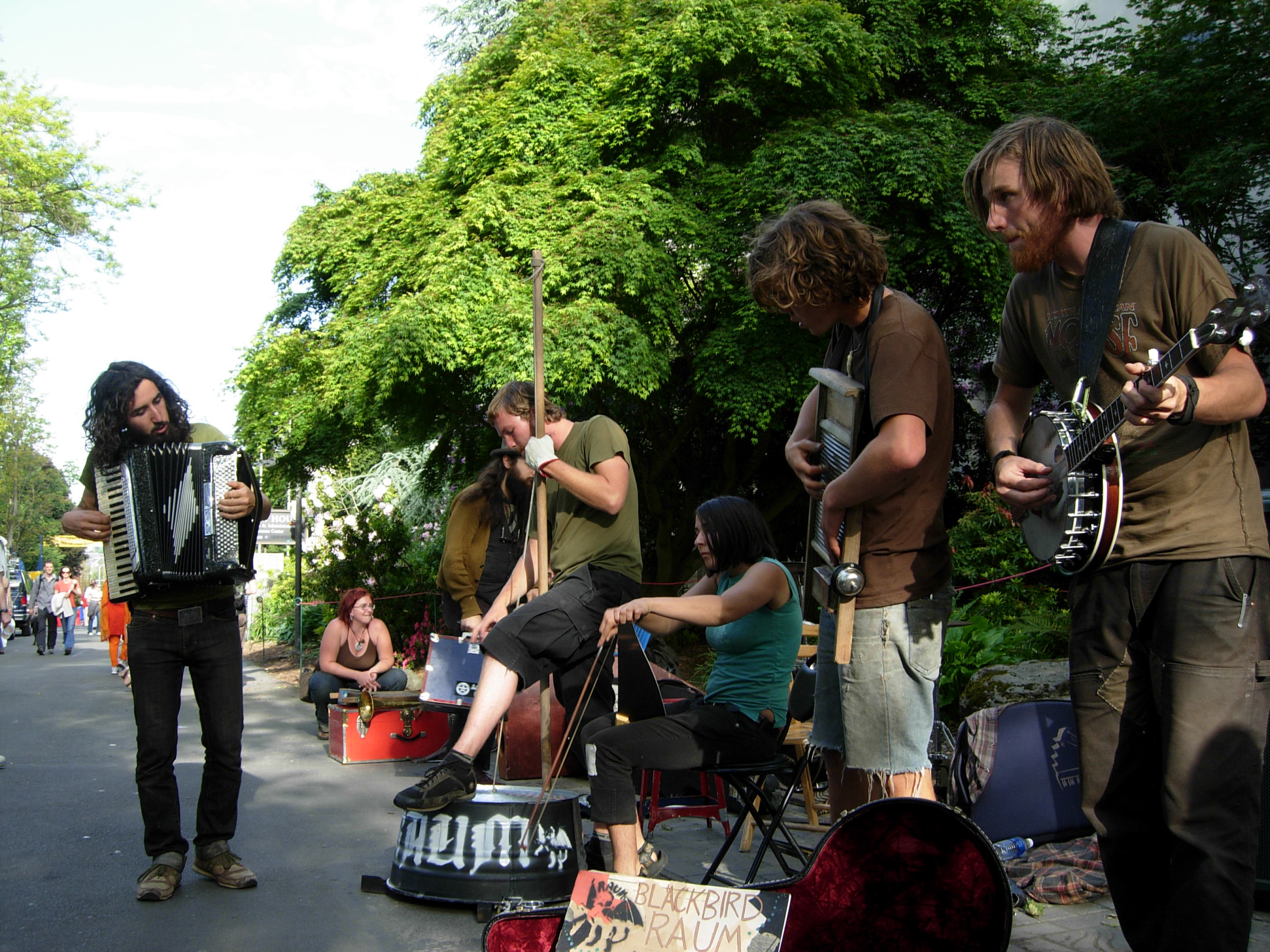
- Blackbird Raum performing at Northwest Folklife Festival in Seattle, WA (2007)

Background information
- Origin: Santa Cruz, CA
- Genres: Anarcho-punk, acoustic, Folk-punk, Blues, Traditional folk music, Ragtime, country
- Members: CPN
- Past members: Roberto Miguel; Mars; Zack Religious; David; KC; Jillian Edward Chaplin; Amelia; Allen Degenerate
- Website: Official website

Blackbird Raum is a folk punk band from Santa Cruz, California, formed in 2004. They are known for their frantic live shows and anarchist politics. They have toured Europe and the U.S.

== 2004-2007: Formation and demos ==
Blackbird Raum was formed in 2004 by banjoist CPN and accordionist Zack while living at UCSC housing in Santa Cruz, California. The band was haphazard at first, playing gigs and busking with a band randomly composed of other musicians living in or around Santa Cruz. They made their first dollar from a man on a date who paid them to leave. During this period, they wrote songs including "Honey in the Hair" and "Coal" and recorded a demo. After some frustrations with chaotic nature of the lineup, CPN left Santa Cruz for a year to play in other projects. When he returned he and Zack agreed to try the band again and a lineup was cemented with the addition of K.C. on washboard, David on washtub bass and Mars on musical saw and mandolin. They quickly wrote new material and recorded what was to be their first album, Purse-Seine, named after the poem by Robinson Jeffers.

== 2007-2010: Swidden ==
The band were unsatisfied with Purse-Seine and produced the follow-up, Swidden, promoting it with a full U.S. tour and several other tours. Two years later, they followed up with Under the Starling Host. During the release of UTSH, the band members set up a small collectively run anarchist record label called Black Powder to support other radical folk projects, including the Hail Seizures. After the release of UTSH, the band took a hiatus for a few years, playing few gigs. After the 2011 release of the Hail Seizures, Blackbird Raum split 7-inch K.C. left the band.

== 2012-2013: "False Weavers" ==
In 2012, Blackbird Raum regrouped, replacing K.C. on washboard with Allen Degenerate and signing to Silver Sprocket Bicycle Club for the release of False Weavers in 2013. Recorded at John Vanderslice's Tiny Telephone Studios, the album marked a change in sound, with psychedelic touches the band has attributed to their love of Chumbawamba and Crass. Five months of touring in the US and Europe followed.

== 2015-2016: "Destroying," Mars's departure, and "Nevermind The Ballads" ==
Following the release of False Weavers, the band teamed up with Dublin based folk band "Lankum" (then called Lynched) to create a new album "Destroying," released in 2015. The bands toured together before the release of the album. After the tour, the band announced the departure of Mars, who had been contributing to vocals and songwriting greatly, as well as playing the mandolin, musical saw and other instruments. After Mars left, the band took a short break before a short tour followed by the release of an EP titled "Nevermind The Ballads" in 2016.

== 2023-present: "come into your power," ==
After a long break between releasing new music but a continued presence on social media, Blackbird Raum released "come into your power" on July 1, 2023. The new EP featured former band members and multiple cameos from groups, including Lyngfarer, Casey Mattson, Holy Locust, the Resonant Rogues and Mama' s Broke. This new EP has yet to be introduced with a formal tour, as the band's last public performance occurred March 5, 2016.

== Lyrical and ideological influences ==
Blackbird Raum's lyrics tend to paint a bleak picture of modern society, focusing on issues like the destruction of the environment, mental illness, and class warfare. They have described themselves as eco-anarchists.

In an interview with The Sunday Times of Malta, banjo player CPN had this to say about their political views:

It's clear that if industrial/consumer civilisation continues on its current course we will eradicate life on the planet. The sea is filled with plastic bags and there is more dioxin in the breast milk of American mothers than the amount legally acceptable for cows. Past attempts to redress the ills of capitalism have led to even worse horrors. We’d all rather live in Sweden than North Korea, but the Scandinavians produce trash and toxic waste like any other country. Change is confusing and dangerous, but it’s a dire necessity. One thing is clear: the answer will come from people, not power.

The lyrics and song names often contain references to historical events, ancient myths and cultural icons:

- "Ars Goetia," which references the Ars Goetia, a 17th-century grimoire of Hermetic mysticism
- "Silent Spring," which references the book Silent Spring by Rachel Carson
- "Lucasville," a song about the riot in the Southern Ohio Correctional Facility
- "The Helm of Ned Kelly," talking about the Australian bushranger Ned Kelly
- "Old One Eye," making an incorrect reference to Odin's sacrifice in Norse Mythology
- "Ravachol in Valhalla," named for the Illegalist anarchist Ravachol
- "Conquest of Bread," named for the book Conquest of Bread by Peter Kropotkin
- "Cadillac Desert," named for the book Cadillac Desert by Marc Reisner

Blackbird Raum makes use of epigraphs from many poets and writers. Among them are William Blake, George R. Stewart, Sir Thomas Malory, Gary Snyder, Kenneth Rexroth, Robinson Jeffers, and Black Elk.

== Discography ==
- RAUM DEMO-2005, released public in 2021
- Purse-Seine – 2007, Quiver Distro
- Swidden – 2008, Quiver Distro
- Under the Starling Host – 2009, Black Powder Records
- Split 7-inch w/ Hail Seizures – 2011, Go Records
- False Weavers – 2013, Silver Sprocket
- Destroying – 2015, Silver Sprocket
- Nevermind the Ballads – 2016, No Time Records
- Come into your power – 2023, CPNPC, Black Mold Tapes
