= F-Minus =

American hardcore punk band

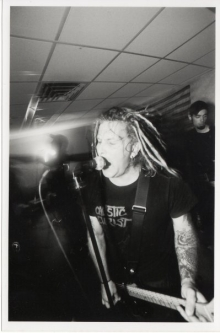
- Brad Logan of F-Minus

Background information
- Origin: Huntington Beach, California, United States
- Genres: Hardcore punk, crust punk, powerviolence
- Years active: 1995–2004
- Labels: Hellcat; Alternative Tentacles
- Members: Brad Logan; Erica Daking; Adam Zuckert; Jen Johnson

F-Minus was an American hardcore punk band formed in 1995 in Huntington Beach, California, United States, started by Jen Johnson and Brad Logan. F-Minus was known for their dueling male and female vocals in songs that were sometimes as short as 12 seconds ("Fuck You O.C."). Before breaking up in 2004, their last album was recorded by Steve Albini. Throughout their career, they covered such bands as Antidote, Black Randy and the Metro Squad, 7 Seconds, Negative Approach, and Agnostic Front. Brad Logan currently runs his own record label Blacknoise, and is also member of the New York band Leftöver Crack. Jen Johnson currently is the designer and owner of clothing label E.C. Star, and also is a member of the California band Ammunition Affair.

== Members ==
=== Final line up ===
- Brad Logan - vocals, guitar
- Erica Daking - vocals, guitar
- Joe Steinbrick - bass
- Adam Zuckert - drums

=== Former members ===
- Jen Johnson - vocals, bass
- Sarah Lee - guitar
- Chris Lagerborg - drums
- John Guerra - drums
- JP Otto - drums

== Discography ==
=== Albums ===
- Self Titled LP/CD (Hellcat, 1999)
- Suburban Blight LP/CD (Hellcat, 2001)
- Wake Up Screaming LP/CD (Hellcat, 2003)
- Won't Bleed Me / Failed Society CD (Alternative Tentacles, 2005)

=== EPs ===
- Voice of Treason Cassette (Self Released, 1996)
- Failed Society 7" (Hellcat, 1997)
- Won't Bleed Me 7" (Pelado, 1997)
- Failed Society / Won't Bleed Me Cassette (Self Released, 1997)
- Split With Crack Rock Steady 7 - Baby Jesus Sliced Up In The Manger 10" (Knife or Death, 2001)
- Sweating Blood 7" (Bridge 9, 2003)

=== Compilations ===
- Give Em' The Boot Volume 1 CD (Hellcat, 1997)
- Old Skars and Upstarts CD/LP (Alive, 1997)
- Give Em' The Boot Volume 2 CD (Hellcat, 1999)
- No Time To Kill (Checkmate, 1999)
- Vans Off The Wall Volume 3 CD (Vans, 2000)
- Tomorrow Seems So Hopeless CD (Eyeball, 2000)
- Give Em' The Boot Volume 3 CD (Hellcat, 2002)
- Against Police Injustice CD (Non-Commercial, 2003)
- Punk O' Rama Volume 8 CD (Epitaph, 2003)
- Give Em' The Boot Volume 4 CD (Hellcat, 2004)
- Give Em' The Boot DVD (Hellcat, 2005)
- The Kids Are Gonna Pay Split (In Your Face (7 Seconds Cover))(2006)

== See also ==
- Leftöver Crack
