= Citizen Fish =

English ska punk band

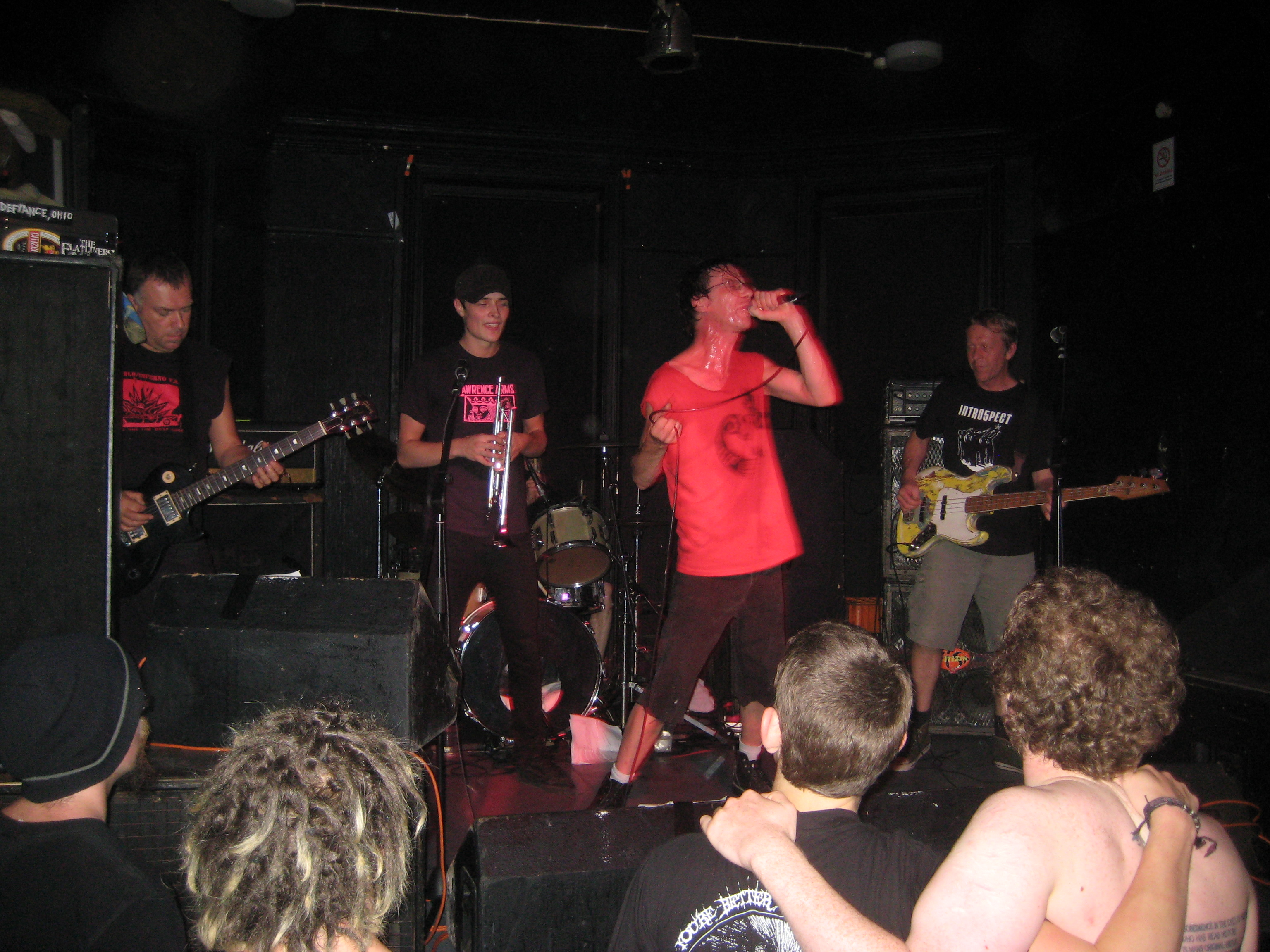
- Citizen Fish in Manchester, 2008

Background information
- Origin: Bath, England
- Genres: Ska punk; anarcho-punk
- Years active: 1990–present
- Labels: Bluurg; Lookout!; Fat Wreck Chords; Alternative Tentacles
- Spinoff of: Culture Shock; Subhumans
- Members: Dick Lucas (vocals); Jasper Pattison (bass, vocals); Phil Bryant (guitar); Silas Berney (drums); Alex Gordon (trumpet, piano, accordion); Matt Dowse (trombone)
- Past members: Larry (guitar); Trotsky (drums); Minty (trumpet); Roberto Miguel Reyes (trombone); Jessica Mills (saxophone)

Citizen Fish are an English punk rock band that has been active since 1990 and shares members with Subhumans. Citizen Fish does not emphasize the raw political statements and nihilistic viewpoint of the former, instead focusing on issues of social alienation and human interaction, viewed through a more optimistic lens. Both bands deal with themes such as anti-consumerism and vegetarianism.

== History ==
Based around Bath, England, the original members were Dick Lucas (vocals), Jasper (bass), Trotsky (drums), and Larry (guitar). Following their first album, Free Souls in a Trapped Environment, Larry left the band and was replaced by Phil, who, along with Dick and Trotsky, had previously been a member of the Subhumans. Jasper and Dick had previously played together in Culture Shock.

In July 2006, Silas (formerly of Bath-based band Cooper S with Jasper and Andy Evans) replaced Trotsky on drums. In the following month, after a five-year recording hiatus, the band returned to the studio to record songs for a split album with the New York band Leftöver Crack, Deadline.

Their latest and eighth full-length studio album, 2011's Goods was hailed as a return to form, and they remain active, releasing the Manmade EP in 2015.

== Discography ==
- Free Souls in a Trapped Environment (Bluurg Records Fish 24, 1990)
- Disposable Dream 7-inch EP (Bluurg Records Fish 27/Lookout! Records No. 60, 1992
- Wider Than a Postcard (Bluurg Records, 1992)
- Live Fish (Live in Germany) (Bluurg Records Fish 28, 1992)
- Citizen Fish/AOS3 split EP (Bluurg Records Fish 29, 1992)
- Flinch (Bluurg Records Fish 31, 1993)
- Millennia Madness (Bluurg Records Fish 34, Lookout! Records No. 123, 1995)
- Thirst (Lookout! Records No. 152, 1996)
- Psychological Background Reports (Bluurg Records, 1996) - collection rare and previously unreleased material
- Habit 7-inch EP (Lookout! Records, 1998)
- Active Ingredients (Lookout! Records No. 212, 1998, Bluurg Records FISH38, 1999)
- Life Size (Honest Don's Old English Recordings, 2001)
- What Time We On? Live Album, (Bluurg Records Fish 47, 2006)
- Baby-Punchers/Meltdown Split 7-inch EP with Leftöver Crack (Fat Wreck Chords FAT-226, 2006)
- Deadline split album with Leftöver Crack (Fat Wreck Chords, FAT-720, 2007)
- Goods (Studio Album, Alternative Tentacles - virus424, 2011)
- Dancing on Spikes (EP, 2012)
- Manmade (EP, 2015)

== Compilations ==
- Heide Sez... (Lookout! Records, 1996)
- This Is The A.L.F. (Mortarhate Records, 1998)
- Forward Till Death (Lookout! Records, 1999)
- Welcome To The Welfare State (BYO Records, BYO 66, 1999) Song: "Will Swap" (This is a different version from the one released on the Life Size LP)
- You Call This Music?! Volume 1 (Geykido Comet Records, 2000)
- This Are UK Ska, Volume (Do The Dog Records, 2001)

== Music videos ==
- Dividing Lines (1995)
- Talk About the Weather (1996)
- Human Conditioner (2011)
- Discomfort Zone (2011)
- Better (2011)
- Unemplode (2012)
