= Victoria Ska Fest =

Victoria Ska & Reggae Festival
- Genre: Ska, reggae, ska punk, punk rock, third wave ska, dancehall, dub, hip hop, post ska, rocksteady
- Dates: June 19–23, 2019 - Ska Fest XX (2019)
- Locations: Victoria, British Columbia; Canada
- Years active: 2000-2019, 2022–present
- Website: victoriaskafest.ca

The Victoria Ska and Reggae Festival aka "Ska Fest" is a music festival that takes place every summer in Victoria, British Columbia, Canada. The festival is organized and executed by the Victoria BC Ska Society, a non-profit organization, and over 200 volunteers. It is the longest running ska festival in North America. Despite its name, it has also featured artists from a broad spectrum of genres including punk rock, hip-hop, soul music, calypso music, jazz, and more.

The 20th anniversary edition occurred June 19 through 23, 2019 and featured Ky-mani Marley, Less Than Jake and Cherry Poppin' Daddies.

The Ska Fest went on hiatus in 2020-21, and 2022 was the 21st annual edition.

== History ==
The first Victoria Ska Festival was a one-day event on August 12, 2000 at Market Square, Victoria. By 2012 it had grown into a five-day event spanning multiple venues, and attracting 10,000 attendees over the course of the festival. Past notable headliners include Toots and the Maytals, Ky-Mani Marley, Skatalites, Dub FX, Easy Star All Stars, and Fishbone.

The event was first organized by Dane Roberts to complete a practical term towards his degree at University of Victoria. The first festival featured The Scofflaws, King Django, Chris Murray and Pressure Cooker.

2010 saw the festival expand into other media platforms by incorporating a "Sights and Stories art Exhibit" featuring recorded audio and visual documents from community members regarding the festival.

2011 marked the 12th festival and featured a return to Market Square and an expanded schedule, making the festival five days long. The expansion of media platforms increased with the introduction of the Rocksteady Collective. This feature included live body painting, exclusive or unique performances and workshops with artists, as well as interactive art canvases allowing patrons to create their own Ska & Reggae Fest memories. Since its inclusion in 2011, the Rocksteady Collective has grown to host its own series of concerts during the festival, as well as hosting culinary arts and burlesque dancing, in addition to remaining the visual arts component of the festival.

In 2015 the name was changed to the "Victoria Ska & Reggae Festival" to better describe the event's diverse programming.

The festival went on hiatus in 2020-21.

== Line-ups ==
I - 2000 - The Scofflaws, King Django, Chris Murray, Pressure Cooker, Monkey Spanker, Chocomo Sound, Skanky Crackdown, The Bloodwarmers

II - 2001 - Street Prophet Union, The Bloodwarmers, Chocomo Sound, The Kiltlifters, Two and a Half White Guys, Mad Bomber Society, Easy Big Fella, NY Ska Jazz Ensemble

III - 2002 -The Hoodwinks, The Abolitionists, The Kiltlifters, Dub Freque, The Pietasters, Pressure Cooker, Easy Big Fella, The Abolitionists, General Rudie, Street Prophets Union

IV - 2003 -The Slackers, The Kingpins, Chris Murray, The Aggrolites, One Drop, JFK & the Conspirators, The Kiltlifters, Los Furios, The Afterbeat, DJ Skip, The Operators, The Bloodwarmers, The Hoodwinks, Zsolt Sandor & Christian Stevenson, Chris Murray, Esquimalt Jazz Ensemble Grads, DJ Jebus

V - 2004 - Stangejah Cole, Dr. Ring Ding, King Django, Eastern Standard Time, The Debonaires, Westbound Train, General Rudie, One Drop, The Kiltlifters, Califfo De Luxe, V.I.S.A. Ska Jazz Orchestra, Greg Milka Crowe, The Hoochy Girls, Los Furios, The Operators, The Soul Captives, Monkey, Ten Too Late, Uprite Dub Orchestra, The Debonaires, Westbound Train, General Rubie, The Kiltlifters

VI - 2005 - Long Beach Short Bus, Fishbone, Mad Bomber Society, Los Furios, Victor Rice, Western Conference, Those Rapskallions, DJ Skip, The Makeshift Heroes, One Drop, The Allentons, Afterbeat

VII - 2006 - Junior Reid, The Aggrolites, La Severa Matacera, The Kiltlfters, DJ Salamander, One Drop, Wednesday Night Heroes, Cambridge, Barrington Levy, The Next Best Thing, Subcity Dwellers, The Real Deal, The Wedgewoods, Georgetown Orbits

VIII - 2007 - Neville Staple, Mad Caddies, The Sainte Cathrines, The Real McKenzies, One Night Band & JFK, MamaPulpa, The Soul Captives, Uprite Dub Orchestra, Satori, Macaque, Current Swell, Skaboom!, The Elixxers, Subcity Dwellers, One Drop, The Rebel Spell, Los Rastrillos, The Itals, Paapa Wastik, Arbutus Trio, The Drastics, Tequila Mockingbird Orchestra

IX - 2008 - Skatalites, Easy Star All Stars, King Django, Los Furios, The Kiltlifters, Pato Banton & The Mystic Roots Band, The Debonaires, Current Swell, Buena Buya, Tequila Mockingbird Orchestra, Staylefish, Skavenjah, Dubmatix Sound System, Jon and Roy, Inspector, Mama Pulpa, Salon Victoria, Karmacanix, Greenlaw

X - 2009 - Mighty Mighty Bosstones, The Slackers, Chris Murray, Voodoo Glow Skulls, La Severa Matacera, Los Rastrillos, One Drop (reunion), The Hoochy Girls (reunion), Georgetown Orbits, Tequilla Mockingbird Orchestra, Jah Cutta and Determination, Subatomic Sound System, Vic Ruggiero, Brave New Waves, Dread Daze, The Fabulous Lo Lo, Greg Crowe & the Scarlet Union, The Kiltlifters, Los Furios, Maskatesta, Rude City Riot, Stepper, Rocky Mountain Rebel Music

XI - 2010 - Fishbone, The Black Seeds, Cherry Poppin' Daddies, The Aggrolites, Katchafire, Easy Big Fella (reunion), Los Kung-Fu Monkeys, Skampida, One Shot Left, The Israelites, The Shane Philip Tree, Brave New Waves, Danny Rebel & KGB, The Valuables, The Beatdown, The Resignators, Big Reds, Rocky Mountain Rebel Music

XII - 2011 - Ky-Mani Marley, Gramps Morgan, The Planet Smashers, The Resignators, Mama Pulpa, Hillside Hooligans, Kae Sun, Everybody Left, Gaudi, Ken Boothe, Jon and Roy, Chris Murray, The Ivy League Brawlers, Natural Flavas, The Afterbeat, Micro Bongo Soundsystem, Bananafish Dance Orchestra, The Klaxon, Giraffe Aftermath, Brave New Waves, The Novamatics, Rocky Mountain Rebel Music, DJ Frame, Mobadass

XIII - 2012 - Toots and the Maytals, The Pietasters, Katchafire, Clinton Fearon and the Boogie Brown Band, Larry and His Flask, Ninjaspy, Burnt, Leroy "Heptone" Sibbles, Tequila Mockingbird Orchestra, Adham Shaikh, Blitz the Ambassador, La Pobreska, Mad Bomber Society, Dope Soda, Easy Big Fella, The Boom Booms, The Delirians, Mindil Beach Markets, Danny Rebel and the KGB, Hillside Hooligans, Blackberry Wood, Rocky Mountain Rebel Music, Sola Rosa, Rude City Riot, Heads Hang Heavy, Monkey, Bananafish Dance Orchestra, Natural Flavas, Bachaco, Los Furios, Giraffe Aftermath, DJ Su Comandante, Whitey, Step Back Dave, Tuff Jelly, Forecast

XIV - 2013 - Mos Def, Mad Caddies, Dub FX, Tanya Stephens, Katchafire, The Planet Smashers, Sierra Leone's Refugee All Stars, Blitz the Ambassador, The Debonaires, The Rocksteady Seven, The Resignators, Suburban Legends, J Boog, Jon Middleton, JK and the Relays, Bananafish Dance Orchestra, Giraffe Aftermath, Sweetleaf, Bocce Avocado, Dope Soda, Los Furios, Hillside Hooligans, Ponderosas, Rocky Rebel Mountain Music, The Chantrelles, DJ Su Commandante, Aarandhna.

XV - 2014 - Shaggy, Lynval Golding, Fishbone, Barrington Levy, The Aggrolites, Los Rastrillos, Providencia, The Expanders, Zvuloon Dub System, Kobo Town, Burnt, Giraffe Aftermath, Bananafish Dance Orchestra, Hillside Hooligans, Brave New Waves, Mad Bomber Society, Everybody Left, SweetLeaf, Georgetown Orbits, The Skinny, Downtown Mischief, Blackwood Kings, The Brass Action, The Skinny, Dope Soda

XVI - 2015 - Hepcat, Morgan Heritage, Third World, The Slackers, Stickybuds, Mustard Plug, Mindil Beach, Dubmatix, Keith & Tex, Clinton Fearon, Kobo Town, De Bruces A Mi, The Real McKenzies, House of Shem, Dope Soda, Kutapira, Tasman Jude, The Leg Up Program, Hillside Hooligans, Arise Roots, DJ Dubconcious, Def3, Whitey, Downtown Mischief, Tank Gyal, Dia-Nos, Sweetleaf, Ydna Murd, Boomshack, The Boom Booms, MC Unite!, Kristie McCracken, Ali & The Budz, Blackwood Kings, DJ Anger, DJ Su Comandante Espinoza

XVII - 2016 - Toots & The Maytals, Dub FX, The Black Seeds, Western Standard Time Orchestra, Tequila Mockingbird Orchestra, Orquestra Brasiliera de Jamaicana, Amy Winehouse Extravaganza, Mikey Dangerous, Dope Soda, Ninjaspy, The Leg-Up Program, The Fabulous LoLo, Bocce Avocado, Entangados, Illvis Freshly, Tasman Jude, Skarate Kid, SweetLeaf, Blackberry Wood, DJ Dubconscious, Mud Funk, The Party On High Street, BOUSADA, The Sentiments, More Than Mayhem, Mr. Fantastik, The Phonosonics, Mt. Eliah

XVIII - 2017 - Booker T. Jones, Tarrus Riley, Dean Fraser, Blak Soil Band, The Black Seeds, Mad Caddies, The Skints, Jah9, Mike Love, Keith & Tex, Skampida, Perro Bravo, La Banda Skavalera, Shauit, The Boom Booms, BURNT, Los Furios, Roots Roundup, Batuque Axé, Tonye, Dope Soda, Everybody Left, Illvis Freshly, Entangados, SweetLeaf, Down North, The New Groovement, Caleb Hart & The Royal Youths, Mistica, Rusty Zinn, Jon Middleton, Out Of Control Army, The Blackwood Kings, The Party On High Street, Boomshack, Tank Gyal, The Om Sound, Cheko & The Lion Rockers, Railtown Sound System, Yellowsky, Ostwelve, Dockside Green

XIX - 2018 - The Mighty Mighty Bosstones, Ozomatli, Chali 2na, Panteon Rococo, Freddie McGregor, Culture, Fortunate Youth, The Kingpins, The Dreadnoughts, Giant Panda Guerilla Dub Squad, Western Standard Time Ska Orchestra feat. members of Hepcat and The Aggrolites, Ready to Rock Crew, Tribute to No Doubt, Kingston Rudieska, Parahyba Jazz Foundation, SweetLeaf, Illvis Freshly, Jimi Needles, Caleb Hart & The Royal Youths, Bousada, Hillsdie Hooligans, Tank Gyal, Erica D, Freddy V and The Foundation, Lovecoast, Mt. Doyle, The Funkee Wadd, The Resignators, The McGillicuddys, Mad Riddim, Phonosonics, Yellowsky, Lady AK, Ganjo Bassman, Sam Klassik, Back Eddy & The Procrastinators, Fableway, DJ Rossco, The Phatfunks, Rebel Selector, Foolish, Tecstylez, DJ Teedub

XX - 2019 - Ky-Mani Marley, Leroy “Heptone” Sibbles, Less Than Jake, Cherry Poppin' Daddies, Sister Nancy, The Pietasters, Dub Pistols, Mama Pulpa, Macka B, Entangados, Def3, Chainska Brassika, The Leg-Up Program, Meryem Saci, Brehdren, Mat the Alien, Greenlaw, The Bandulus, Salsahall Collective, The Capital Collective, The Steadies, Apex Breaks, Stephen Lewis, TecStylez, Handsome Tiger, SweetLeaf, SexWeather, The Funkee Wadd, Def3, Ganjobassman, The Miles Skye Club, One Drop, LowDown Brass Band, Danny Rebel & the KGB, Mt. Doyle, Blackwood Kings, Tank Gyal, Isaac Chambers, The Scotch Bonnets, Boogát, Boomshack, Erica Dee, Phonosonics, Selecter Abel
