= The Brass Action =

Canadian six-piece independent band

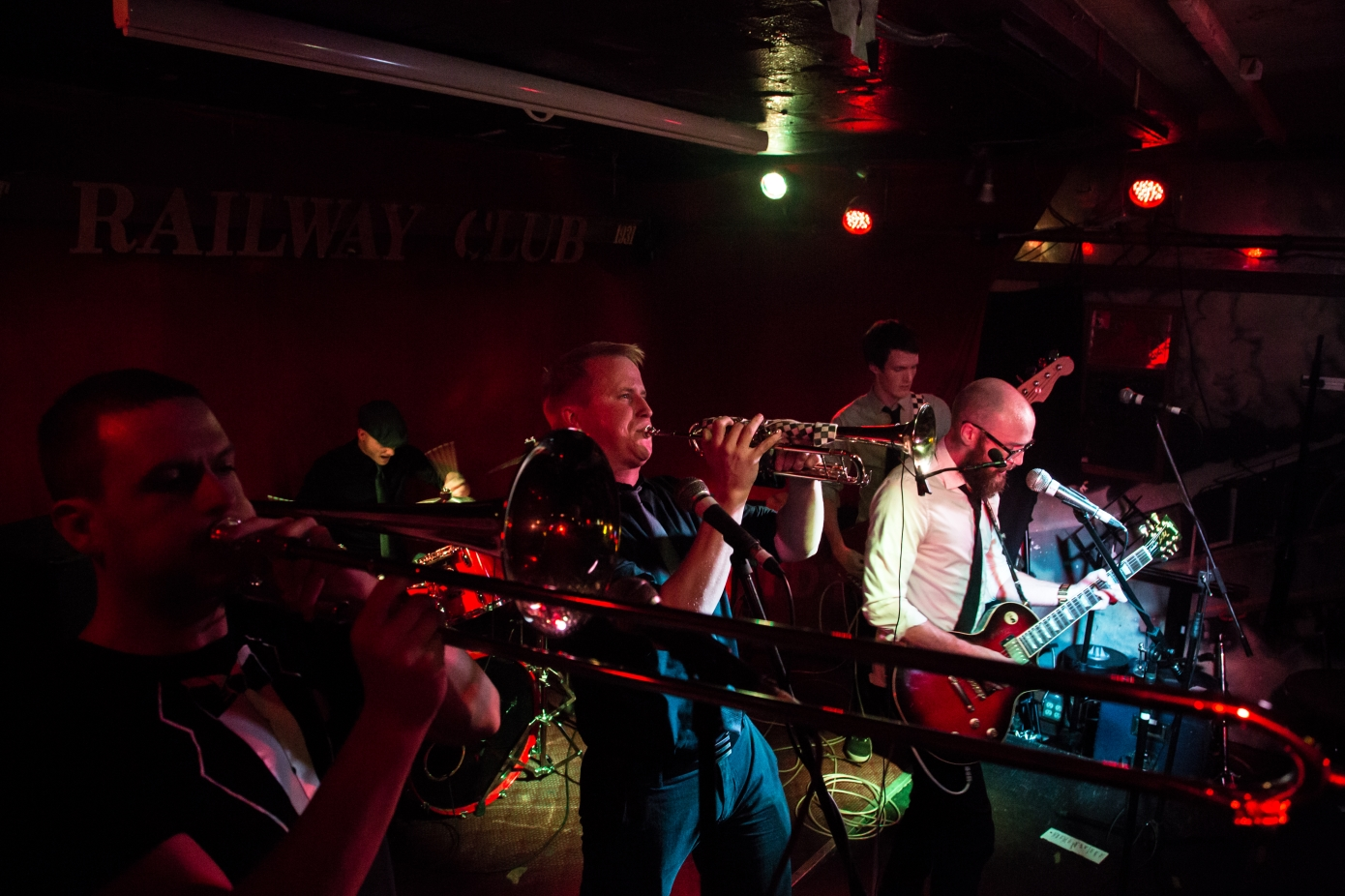
- The Brass Action performing live at The Railway Club in Vancouver, BC on November 23, 2013

Background information
- Origin: Vancouver, British Columbia, Canada
- Genres: Punk, ska, brass punk
- Years active: 2007–2020
- Label: Independent
- Past members: Ryan Clare; Richard Mitchell; Tyson Sully; Kieron Rhys Lillo; Bradley Young; Derek Simpson; Mael Thébault; Evan Kelly; Garrett McLaughlin; Mark Myskiw; Alan Keelan; William Shand
- Website: http://thebrassaction.com

The Brass Action was a Canadian six-piece independent band from Vancouver, British Columbia. The band played a unique style that mixes the intensity of punk rock and rockabilly with the dancy, horn driven sounds of ska.

== History ==
The Brass Action formed in 2007 in Vancouver, British Columbia, and have since released three independent full-length albums.

The band's first album, entitled Making Waves (2013), was recorded over a three-year period and serves as a compilation of EP albums released during that time. The album was recorded and engineered by Paul Boechler at Fader Mountain Sound and Armoury Studios in Vancouver. Mastering was done by Brock McFarlane at CPS Mastering.

Two songs from their album Making Waves were featured in the 2014 film Horns, starring Daniel Radcliffe. The band performed "The Devil Down Below" live in the film, with Joe Anderson's character playing lead trumpet. Their song "11:34 (Hell O'Clock)" is also used as background music. Singer Ryan Clare has a speaking role in the film. Lakeshore Records released an original soundtrack for Horns, including "The Devil Down Below" with other tracks by David Bowie, The Pixies, The Eels, The Flaming Lips, and Marilyn Manson.

"The Devil Down Below" was also included on DyingScene.com's free compilation album Skaface: Evolution, alongside The Mad Caddies, Big D and The Kids Table, Mustard Plug, and The Resignators.

The Brass Action released their second album, No Soundcheck, in 2015. Their first single off the album, "Moonlite", was released in 2014, and tracks "Nothing to See Here" and "Good Intentions, Wong Direction" were included on subsequent volumes of an, independently released, compilation album series entitled Pacific Sound System. The compilation album series features a collection of bands from the Pacific Northwest region of North America, such as The Dreadnoughts, Easy Big Fella, and Los Furios.

The Brass Action's third album, Brouhaha, was released in 2019. Their first single off the album, "Wreckless", was released in 2018, and tracks "It's Not Me, It's You" and "Political Shitposting" were included on a split album, with the Vancouver punk band, Indications, entitled Tall Boys. The Brass Action's track "IDWTKYWMBKL" was included on the third volume of the Pacific Sound System compilation album series. Their track "The Foyer" was included on Punkcouver Volume 3, which is part of a series of compilation albums, released by Vancouver promoter, Rocket from Russia, to highlight prominent bands in the local Vancouver punk scene.

The Brass Action has supported many notable acts, including The Planet Smashers, Mad Caddies, The Interrupters, The Toasters, Chris Murray, Kobo Town, The Beatdown, K-man and the 45's, The Fundamentals, Los Furios, Brehdren, The Elixxxirs, Antiparty, The Bone Daddies, and Rude City Riot. On July 2, 2014, the band performed at the 15th annual Victoria Ska Festival, sharing the stage with a number of internationally acclaimed acts such as Shaggy, The Aggrolites, Barrington Levy, Lynval Golding, and Fishbone.

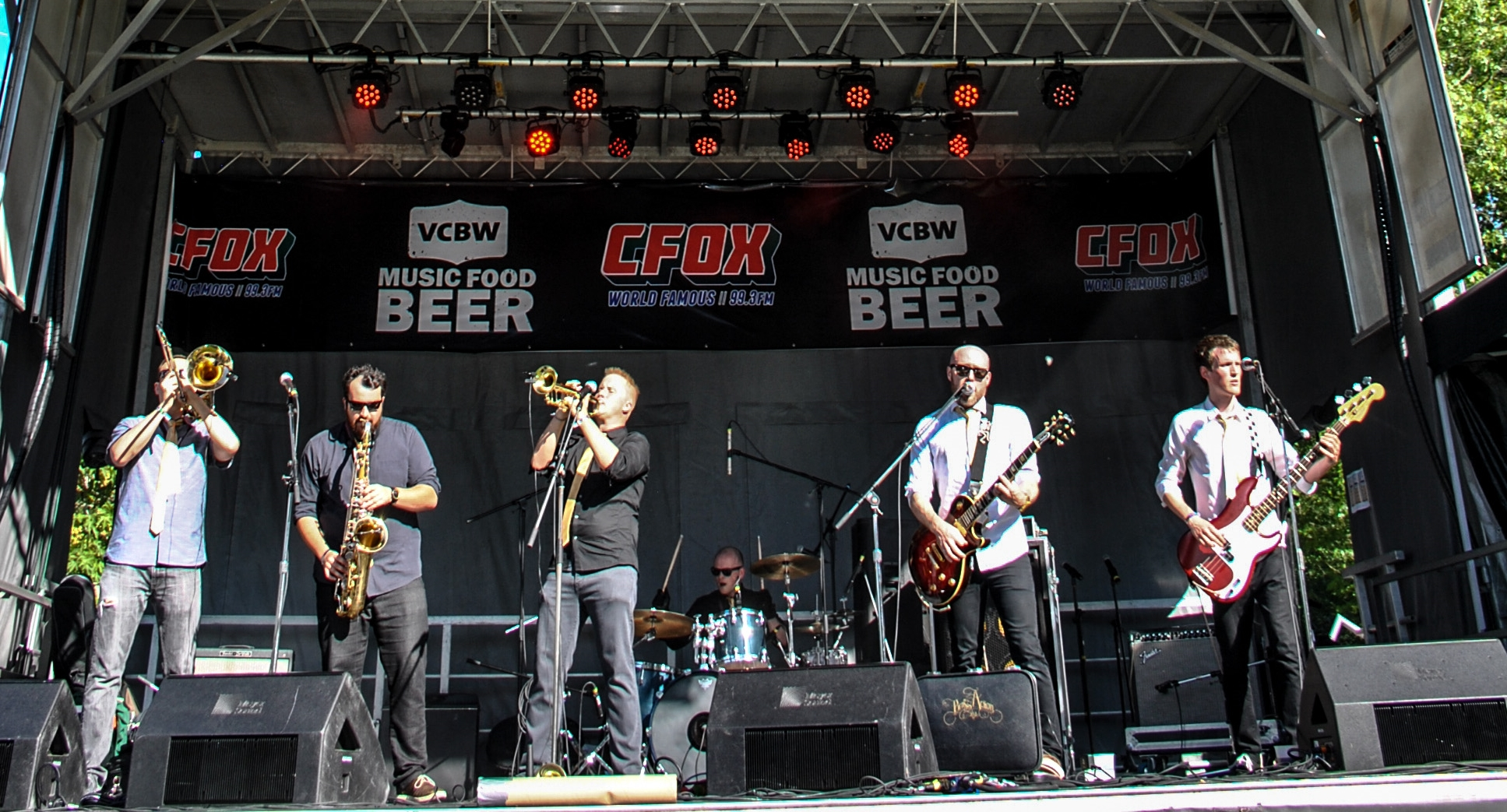
The Brass Action performing live at Vancouver Craft Beer Week, PNE Fairgrounds, June 3, 2016

== Band members ==
=== Final lineup ===
- Ryan Clare – lead vocals, guitar
- Richard Mitchell – trumpet, backing vocals
- Tyson Sully – trombone
- Kieron Rhys Lillo – bass, backing vocals
- Bradley Young – tenor saxophone
- Derek Simpson – drums

=== Former members ===
- Mael Thébault – tenor saxophone, backing vocals
- Evan Kelly – drums
- Garrett McLaughlin – bass, backing vocals
- Mark Myskiw – drums, backing vocals
- Alan Keelan – piano
- William Shand (former member of The Dreadnoughts) – bass, backing vocals

== Discography ==
=== Studio albums ===
- Making Waves, Independent, 2013
- No Soundcheck, Independent, 2015
- Brouhaha, Independent, 2019

=== EPs and singles ===
- "Now THIS is Happening", Independent, 2011
- "11:34 (Hell O'Clock)", Independent, 2012
- "Moonlite", Independent, 2014
- "Wreckless", Independent, 2017
- "Tall Boys", Independent, 2018

=== Compilation albums ===
- Skaface: Evolution, "The Devil Down Below", Dying Scene Records, 2013
- Pacific Sound System, Vol 1, "Nothing To See Here", Independent, 2014
- Horns (Original Motion Picture Soundtrack), "The Devil Down Below", Lakeshore Records, 2014
- Pacific Sound System, Vol 2, "Good Intentions, Bad Direction", Independent, 2015
- What Do You Know About Ska Punk? Vol. 2, "Wreckless", WDYKASP, 2018
- Pacific Sound System, Vol 3, "IDWTKYWMBKL", Independent, 2018
- What Do You Know About Ska Punk? Vol. 3, "It's Not Me It's You", WDYKASP, 2019
- Punkcouver, Vol 3, "The Foyer", Rocket From Russia, 2019

== Videography ==
=== Films ===
- Horns includes a live performance of the song "Devil Down Below" and background use of the song "11:34 (Hell O'clock)" from the album Making Waves. Singer Ryan Clare has a speaking role.

=== Music videos ===
- "The Devil Down Below" (2014)
- "11:34 (Hell O'Clock)" (2014)
- "Nothing To See Here" (2014)
- "Brasser and the Business" (2015)
- "Good Intentions, Wrong Direction" (2016)
- "Seeing Red" (2016)
- "Box Wine" (2016)
- "Wreckless" (2017)
- "Good Intentions, Wrong Direction" (2018)
- "Hero of the Proletariat" (2019)
- "Disposable Razors" (2019)
- "Political Party" (2019)
- "7-Eleven was a Part-Time Job" (2020)
- "IDWTKYWMBKL" (2020)
