= Promises (The Hunters album) =

Studio album by The Hunters
- Released: April 17, 2012
- Recorded: February – March 2011 at Studio DNA Creations in Montreal, Quebec, Canada
- Genres: Punk rock, Rock
- Length: 42:44
- Label: Stomp Records
- Producers: Hugo Mudie; Marc-André Beaudet

The Hunters chronology
Dissent Lasts... (2008)	Promises (2012)	Art Electric (2014)

Singles from Promises
- 1. "Van Party Forever" Released: June 5, 2012; 2. "Faux-Fire, Faux-Gold" Released: November 27, 2012

Professional ratings
Review scores
Source	Rating
Hour Community	3/5 stars
The Punk Site	3.5/5 stars

Promises is the second full-length album by Canadian rock band The Hunters. The album was released on April 17, 2012 on Stomp Records, their first on a record label.

The first single, "Van Party Forever" was released on June 5 and the music video features the band playing with The Sainte Catherines during their farewell tour.

The second music video is made entirely of shots from their journey to The Fest 11 in Gainesville. It was filmed during Hurricane Sandy and features the band driving all the way from Florida to Québec in a rental car as all flights were cancelled. It was released on November 27, 2012.

A documentary webseries about Promises promotional tour was released in January 2013. Titled Driving on Promises, the ten episodes cover the whole tour through Quebec and Ontario. It is based on their roadie's log book.

The album was recorded and produced by Hugo Mudie and Marc-André Beaudet, both from The Sainte Catherines.

== Track listing ==
All lyrics are written by Raphaël Potvin and Dominic Pelletier; all music is composed by The Hunters.

No.	Title	Length
1.	"01/01/11"	3:38
2.	"Last Stop: Cancer"	3:28
3.	"Sparrows"	3:22
4.	"Faux-Fire, Faux-Gold"	2:33
5.	"Van Party Forever"	3:25
6.	"Blind River"	1:47
7.	"Classics"	2:51
8.	"Eleven"	3:49
9.	"Martine Blues"	5:15
10.	"Canicule"	3:53
11.	"White Fireworks"	3:40
12.	"Where I'm Never Coming Back To"	1:03
13.	"Chasing Down the Sun"	3:59

== Personnel ==
The Hunters

- Dominic Pelletier – lead vocals, guitar, harmonica
- Danahé Rousseau-Côté – guitar
- Raphaël Potvin – bass guitar, vocals
- William Duguay-Drouin – drums, percussion, piano

Production

- Produced by Hugo Mudie, Marc-André Beaudet and The Hunters
- Mixed and engineered by Marc-André Beaudet; assisted by Hugo Mudie
- Mastered by Ryan Morey

Art

- Front and back picture by Alexandra Quinn
- Artwork and layout by Jimmi Francoeur
- Art direction by Jimmi Francoeur, Hugo Mudie and The Hunters
