= No Self Control (album) =

Studio album by The Planet Smashers
- Released: August 14, 2001
- Genre: Ska
- Length: 37:27
- Label: Stomp
- Producer: Steven Drake

The Planet Smashers chronology
Life of the Party (1999)	No Self Control (2001)	Mighty (2003)

No Self Control is the fourth full-length release from The Planet Smashers. This album has spawned many fan favorites, including "Blind" and "SK8 or Die". This is only the second album by The Planet Smashers (and first since their self-titled debut) where the album isn't named after its opening track: "No Self Control" is the second track.

Exclaim! described the album as "a testimonial to economic music making," and "in many ways similar to prior outings: short, snappy pop ska tunes that accomplish much within a limited time frame."

== Track listing ==
1. "Fabricated" – 2:43
2. "No Self Control" – 3:45
3. "Wish I Were American" – 3:07
4. "Evaluation Day" – 1:43
5. "Blind" – 2:27
6. "Stupid Present" – 2:36
7. "Struggle" – 2:40
8. "It's Over" – 4:02
9. "Hey Hey" – 2:29
10. "Goin' Out" – 2:47
11. "Record Collector" – 2:17
12. "She's Late" – 2:30
13. "Rambler" – 1:58
14. "SK8 or Die" – 2:23
