= Attack of The Planet Smashers =

Studio album by The Planet Smashers
- Released: February 17, 1998
- Recorded: April 1–11, 1997
- Genre: Ska
- Length: 39:02
- Label: Stomp
- Producer: Chris Murray

The Planet Smashers chronology
| The Planet Smashers (1996) | Attack of The Planet Smashers (1998) | Life of the Party (1999) |

Professional ratings
Review scores
| Source | Rating |
|---|---|
| Allmusic | (not rated ) |

Attack of The Planet Smashers is the second full-length release from The Planet Smashers. This is the first of three collaborations between the Planet Smashers and producer Chris Murray (the other two are Life of the Party and Unstoppable).

== Track listing ==
1. "Attack of The Planet Smashers"–2:39
2. "The 80 Bus"–2:52
3. "Hostile"–2:16
4. "Change"–3:02
5. "Repo Man"–3:19
6. "Romeo"–2:31
7. "Cooler Than You"–2:51
8. "Get Out My Baby"–3:21
9. "My Decision"–3:21
10. "Uncle Gordie"–2:38
11. "Dirty Old Man"–3:28
12. "Take It From The Top"–3:19
13. "She's So Hot"–3:25
