= Life of the Party (album) =

Studio album by The Planet Smashers
- Released: July 20, 1999
- Recorded: January 11–31, 1999
- Genre: Ska
- Length: 41:55
- Label: Stomp
- Producer: Chris Murray

The Planet Smashers chronology
Attack of The Planet Smashers (1997)	Life of the Party (1999)	No Self Control (2001)

Professional ratings
Review scores
Source	Rating
AllMusic	3/5 stars
Times Colonist	8/10

Life of the Party is the third full-length release by the Planet Smashers, released in 1999.

== Critical reception ==
The Gazette wrote: "Their most polished album, Life of the Party returns to the slick songwriting style popularized by the likes of the English Beat in their short but prolific career."

== Track listing ==
1. "Life of the Party" – 2:24
2. "Shame" – 2:40
3. "Too Much Attitude" – 2:48
4. "Swayed" – 3:04
5. "Surfin' in Tofino" – 2:31
6. "All Men Fear Women" – 2:45
7. "You Might Be..." – 2:18
8. "Trouble in Engineering" – 2:28
9. "Super Orgy Porno Party" – 2:35
10. "Wise Up" – 2:36
11. "Whining" – 2:46
12. "No Matter What You Say" – 4:03
13. "Kung Fu Master" – 2:58
14. "Holiday" – 2:40
15. "Save It" – 3:19
