= Come and Get It =

Come and Get It may refer to:

- Come and take it, a last stand battle cry

== Literature and films ==
- Come and Get It (novel), a 1935 novel by Edna Ferber
- Come and Get It (1936 film), an adaption of the novel starring Joel McCrea, Edward Arnold and Frances Farmer
- Come and Get It (1929 film), a lost American silent action film
- Come and Get It, a 2024 novel by Kiley Reid

== Albums ==
- Come an' Get It, a 1981 album by Whitesnake
- Come and Get It: A Tribute to Badfinger, a 1996 album by various artists
- Come and Get It (Rachel Stevens album), 2005
- Come and Get It (Westbound Train album), 2009
- Come and Get It: The Best of Apple Records, a 2010 compilation album
- Come and Get It: The Rare Pearls, a 2012 album by the Jackson 5

== Songs ==
- "Come and Get It" (Badfinger song), a song written by Paul McCartney and released by Badfinger in 1969
- "Come and Get It" (John Newman song), 2015
- "Come & Get It" (Selena Gomez song), 2013
- "Come and Get It", a song by Dannii Minogue from Neon Nights
- "Come and Get It", a song by AC/DC from Stiff Upper Lip
- "Come and Get It", a song by Judas Priest from Ram It Down
- "Come and Get It", a song by Ted Nugent from Scream Dream
- "Come & Get It", a song by Krewella from Get Wet
- "Come and Get It", an anthem for the Las Vegas Raiders written by Ice Cube
- "Come and Get It", a song by The Dollyrots from Barefoot and Pregnant
- "Come and Get It", a song by Overkill from The Electric Age
- "Come n' Get It", a song by Aqua from Megalomania

== See also ==
- Come Get It (disambiguation)
