= Horn section =

Group of musicians playing horns

A horn section is a group of musicians playing horns. In an orchestra or concert band, it refers to the musicians who play the "French" horn, and in a British-style brass band it is the tenor horn players. In many popular music genres, the term is applied loosely to any group of woodwind or brass instruments, or a combination of woodwinds and brass.

== Symphonic ==
In a symphony orchestra, the horn section is the group of symphonic musicians who play the French horn (or German horn or Vienna horn). These musicians are typically seated to the back of the ensemble and may be on either side at the director's discretion. Placing them to the left with their bells toward the audience increases the prominence of the section, whereas on the right, the sound reflects off the back of the stage. Most of the time, players are seated right to left from the director's view based on seating, with the principal horn (first horn) being seated on the right and fourth horn seated on the left. The section is ordered in this way so the principal horn may be heard by all players, as the principal sets the timbre and intonation of the section.

== Popular music ==
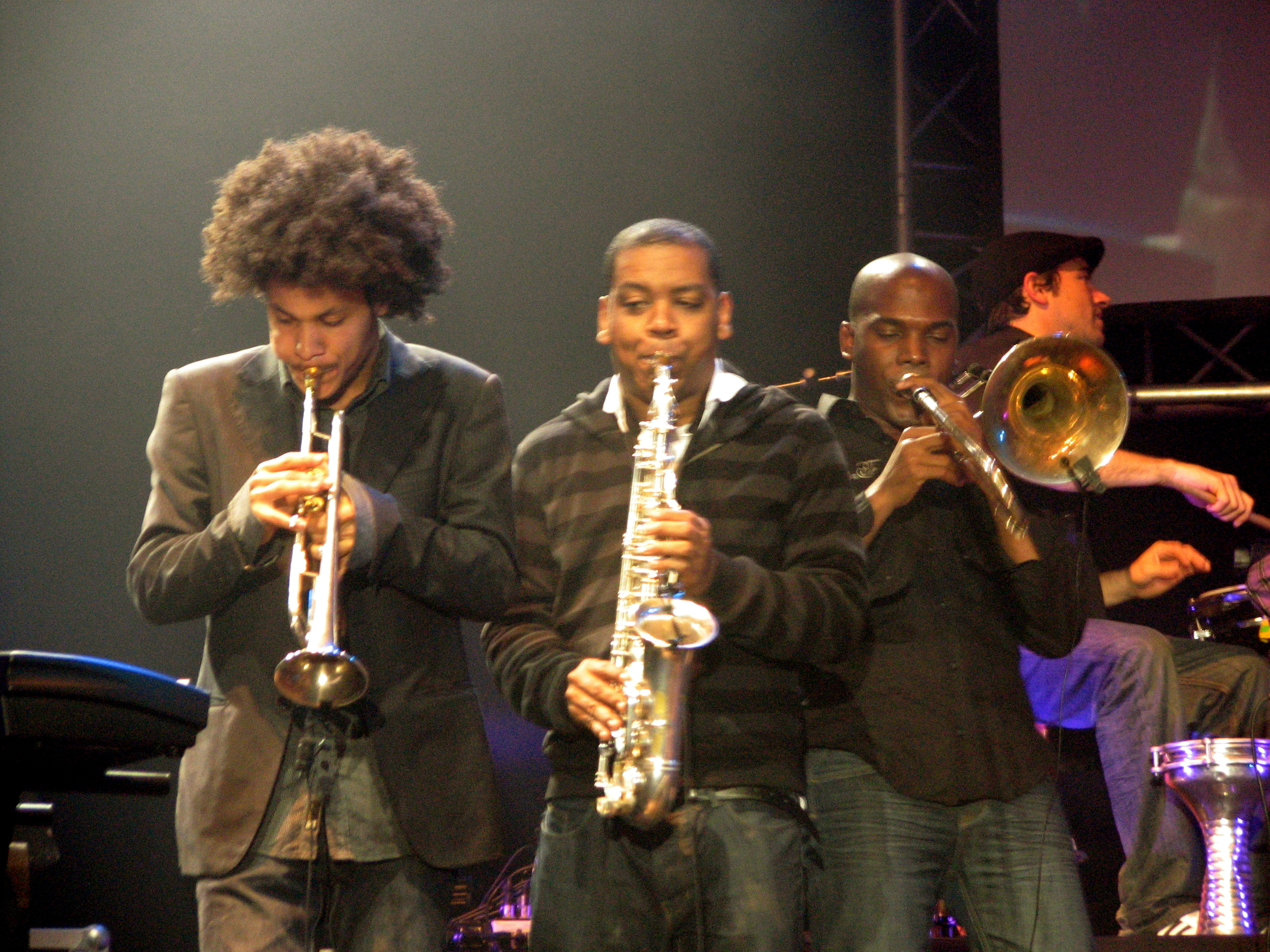
Horn section of Ojos de Brujo

Horn sections are an integral part of musical genres such as jazz, R&B, blues, soul, funk, calypso, Afrobeat, and gospel. Most of these horn sections feature some combination of saxophones, trumpets and trombones. More rarely, other wind or brass instruments such as flute, clarinet or tuba may be added. Other popular musical genres, such as rock, pop, hip-hop, latin, and country music also use horn sections. When only woodwinds are involved, the term "reed section" is often used, even when flutes are included (Anon. 2002).

=== Notable horn sections ===
Horn sections in blues bands and funk groups may be composed of session musicians playing arranged parts, or they may be a consistent group of musicians. A small number of horn sections use a consistent group of musicians who become well known as a unit.

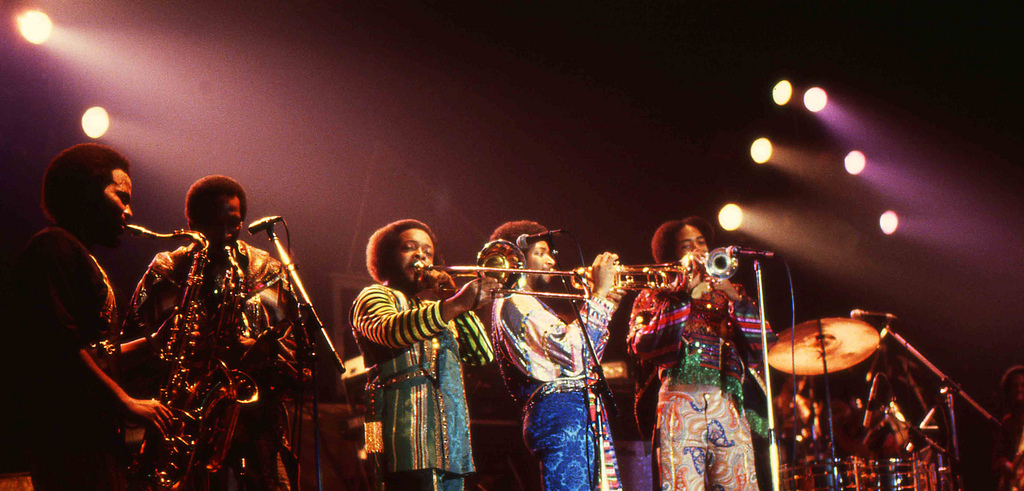
The horn section for funk band Earth, Wind and Fire

- Paul Butterfield Blues Band
- Chicago
- Fat Freddy's Drop
- Horns of Contempt from Hunters & Collectors
- The Empire Horns
- The E Street Horns
- The Horny Horns
- The Uptown Horns from The Rolling Stones and many other notable artists
- The J.B.'s
- The Kick Horns
- The Know How
- The Memphis Horns
- Muscle Shoals Horns
- Phenix Horns from Earth, Wind & Fire
- Punk Funk Horns
- Seawind Horns
- Tower of Power
- The Miami Horns
- Egypt 80
