= A Little Bit About Us =

- Shades of Culture Tape Anthology 93-96

Compilation album by Shades of Culture
- Released: 2000
- Genre: Rap
- Length: 56:39
- Language: English
- Label: Union (Canada); UNION 008 (CD)

Shades of Culture chronology
Mindstate (1998)	A Little Bit About Us (2000)

A Little Bit About Us is a tape anthology by Shades of Culture released on CD in 2000.

== Track listing ==
1. "Who's That" – 3:28
2. "A Little Bit About Us" – 4:16
3. "Eye Out" (remix) – 5:04
4. "Trapped in a Maze" – 5:12
5. "The Letter" – 3:25
6. "Nuff Styles" – 4:00
7. "Good Intense" – 4:19
8. "Mowin Lawns" – 3:16
9. "They Don't Understand" – 3:41
10. "Mad Lyrics" – 4:22
11. "Boom Lookout" – 3:50
12. "Eye Out" – 3:39
13. "Payin' Rent" – 3:59
14. "The Deep" – 4:07
