= Mighty (The Planet Smashers album) =

Studio album by The Planet Smashers
- Released: June 3, 2003
- Genre: Third wave ska
- Length: 50:29
- Label: Stomp
- Producer: Rod Shearer, The Planet Smashers

The Planet Smashers chronology
No Self Control (2001)	Mighty (2003)	Unstoppable (2005)

Professional ratings
Review scores
Source	Rating
The Gazette	4/5
Punknews.org	4/5 stars

Mighty is an album by the Planet Smashers. It was the first of five albums featuring drummer Scott Russell, and it is the only Planet Smashers album featuring trombonist J.O. Begin.

Neville Staple, of the Specials, appears on the album. It was recorded in Montreal over a period of two months.

== Critical reception ==
Exclaim! wrote that the Planet Smashers "break out some new tricks in the latter half of the album, with songs like 'Can't Stop', a folky harmonica-infused song, and 'Recollect', which slows the pace down a notch."

== Track listing ==
1. "Mighty" – 3:19
2. "Explosive" – 2:46
3. "Missionary's Downfall" – 2:28
4. "J'aime ta Femme (I Like Your Girl)" – 2:46
5. "Retribution" – 3:07
6. "Direction" – 4:02
7. "Keep on Coming" – 3:04
8. "Recollect" – 2:50
9. "Can't Stop" – 3:25
10. "Opportunity" – 2:02
11. "Psycho Neighbor" – 3:27
12. "The Big O" – 3:18
13. "Interlude" - 0:04
14. "Girl in the Front Row" – 3:15
15. "Objective" – 2:19
16. "King of Tuesday Night" – 2:30
17. "Until the End" – 3:40
18. "Never Going to Drink Again" – 2:11
