= Mindstate =

Mindstate may refer to:

- Mindstate (Pete Philly and Perquisite album), 2005
- Mindstate (Shades of Culture album), 1998
- Mindstate Design Labs, a pharmaceutical company
