= The Frenetics =

Canadian punk band

- Origin: Montreal, Quebec, Canada
- Genre: Punk rock
- Years active: 1999–2005
- Label: Union Label Group Grenadine Records
- Past members: Malcolm Bauld; Anne Gauthier; Alex Seliger; Philippe Tremblay; Simon Nixon; Patrick Remillard

The Frenetics were a Canadian punk rock band formed in 1999 in Montreal, Quebec.

== History ==
Prior to the Frenetics, Malcolm Bauld was the guitarist and vocalist of seminal Montreal punk band Sissy Havoc which also featured Sei Nakauchi Pelletier of later group TEKE::TEKE. Sissy Havoc had one release, the 1998 NineSevenDemos album (The Mintaka Conspiracy).

Malcolm Bauld, Patrick Remillard and drummer Anne Gauthier formed The Frenetics in 1999, cementing it as a three-piece ensemble whose approach closely connected to punk and power pop sounds with fast and catchy melodies. This is the musical direction captured on the band's first release, the Scenery EP released in 2000 (Grenadine Records), which drew media attention and led to their first Canadian cross-country tour during which Bauld and Gauthier were joined by bassist Simon Nixon.

The Frenetics' first full-length album, These Mistakes Took Years of Practice (2001), was recorded by Greg Smith and released by the Union Label Group. Bassist Philippe Tremblay joined Bauld and Gauthier for the album production and touring support. The album was well received, described by Exclaim! as "fast, blending together punk and mod, adding a splash of emo (not too much though) but keeping the melodic aspects of rock that are so necessary". The Frenetics toured extensively both nationally and abroad in support of the album, including as part of the 2001 Montreal edition of the Warped Tour. During this time, Gauthier occasionally played drums in Montreal all-women group the Nags, as part of Montreal's emerging riot grrrl scene, while Bauld briefly fronted the Deadenders.

In 2004, the band released its follow up album, this time with Alex Seliger of Montreal bands Line Three and the Subumlauts joining on bass. Grey Veins to the Parking Lot was recorded by Andy Magoffin at House Of Miracles in London, Ontario and at Montreal's Breakglass Studios by Marc-André Beaudet and Jace Lasek. The album included musical contributions by members of The Planet Smashers, Kobayashi and Parkside Jones as well as guest vocals by Greg MacPherson. The band toured North America in support of the album which received consistent acclaims and positive reviews, as well as a Montreal International Music Initiative nomination.

After disbanding the Frenetics in 2005, Malcolm Bauld remained active as a singer-songwriter and as contributor to other musical projects. In 2005 Bauld self-released two EPs of his own material, and from 2006 to 2008, joined the bands Pawa Up First and Yesterday's Ring as a multi-instrumentalist, contributing to Yesterday's Ring's album Diamonds In The Ditch (Suburban Home Records). In 2008, he briefly reunited with Sissy Havoc, and put out a full-length solo album Covered in Dust (Art of the Underground label), described as "relaxed and full, with an emphasis on gorgeous folk ballads". Gauthier went on to play in groups such as Hot Springs, Kickers and TR/ST and is currently the head engineer at La La Land Studios in Kentucky.

== Discography ==
=== Full-length albums ===
- 2001: These Mistakes Took Years of Practice (Union Label Group)
- 2004: Grey Veins to the Parking Lot (Union Label Group)

=== EPs and singles ===
- 2000: Scenery EP (Grenadine Records)
- 2002: Countdown Radio - Split 7 inch with Nakatomi Plaza (Fans Of Bad Productions Records)

=== Other contributions ===
- 2000: Sick & Twisted 2 compilation - Wintertime (Sick & Twisted Records)
- 2001: Amp Records Has A Hard-On For Tromaville.com - Scenery (AMP Records)
- 2002: Syrup & Gasoline vol 2 - Wishful Thinking (Grenadine Records)
- 2004: 48ieme parallele - Running Up (New Romance for Kids Records)
- 2004: Montreal Spirit - A Dare To Care Records Family Compilation - As far as I Know (Dare to Care Records)
