= Blue (Flashlight Brown album) =

Studio album by Flashlight Brown
- Released: March 2006
- Recorded: 2005
- Studios: Chateau Relaxeu and Sage And Sound, Los Angeles, CA
- Genres: Bubblegum; pop-punk; pop rock
- Length: 33:59; 39:42 (with bonus tracks)
- Labels: Hollywood; Union 2112; Warner Canada
- Producer: Dave Bassett

Flashlight Brown chronology
My Degeneration (2003)	Blue (2006)

Singles from Blue
- 1. "Save It for Later" Released: November 2005; 2. "I'm A Human" Released: November 2005; 3. "Sicker" Released: 2006

Blue is the fifth and final studio album from Flashlight Brown, released in March 2006 via iTunes through Hollywood Records, and physically on October 31, 2006, through Union 2112 Records (distributed by Warner Music) in Canada.

== Background and production ==
The album was intended to be their second release from Hollywood Records. Work began in 2005, with two songs posted to the band's website in November, "I'm A Human" and a cover of The English Beat's "Save It for Later," which were included in Smallville and Disney's Sky High respectively. The album was released on iTunes in March 2006, with the physical release originally set for June 6. However, the band announced that they had left Hollywood Records due to "extreme differences of opinion", leading to the postponement.

On October 30, 2006, the band posted on their MySpace account that they would release the album the next day, Halloween, in Canada, with a release in Japan following shortly after.

== Reception ==
Professional ratings
Review scores
Source	Rating
Emotional Punk	5/10 stars
Punknews	0.5/5 stars
The Punk Site	3.5/5 stars

The album received mixed reviews. In a generally favourable review, Chart Attack wrote, "It's the kind of pop-rock that isn't merely catchy, it's rewarding after repeated listens." Exclaim!'s review was more negative, saying, "While the energy and enthusiasm put forth on tracks such as "Sicker," "Get Out Of My Car" and "Party By Myself" is admirable, there's a distinct stench of immaturity here that detracts from the overall product."

In a staff review, Punknews.org gave the album a half star out of five stars, calling it "crappy pop punk," while Emotional Punk's review was more mixed, giving the album a 5/10 and stating that while the production is "incredibly slick," they thought the CD "really lacks any real direction."

Bobby Gorman of The Punk Site was more positive, saying "Blue is an entertaining album that I can definitely see me pulling out whenever I want something fun and easy to listen to."

== Track listing ==
All lyrics are written by Flashlight Brown.

Blue
No.	Title	Length
1.	"That's My Problem"	3:09
2.	"Sicker"	2:53
3.	"Party By Myself"	3:04
4.	"Get Out Of My Car"	3:59
5.	"I'm Not Sorry"	3:12
6.	"I'm A Human"	3:25
7.	"Frankie's Second Hand"	2:58
8.	"Fake It"	3:15
9.	"What Do We Care?"	2:58
10.	"Ugly Baby"	2:52
11.	"Loud Music"	2:08
Total length:		33:59

Blue Canadian release
No.	Title	Length
1.	"Sicker"	2:53
2.	"Fake It"	3:15
3.	"I'm Not Sorry"	3:12
4.	"I'm A Human"	3:25
5.	"One Step Away"	2:55
6.	"Get Out Of My Car"	3:59
7.	"Loud Music"	2:08
8.	"Save It for Later"	2:49
9.	"What Did We Care?"	2:58
10.	"Party By Myself"	3:04
11.	"Frankie's Second Hand"	2:58
12.	"That's My Problem"	3:09
13.	"Ugly Baby"	2:52
Total length:		39:42

Blue Japan release
No.	Title	Length
1.	"That's My Problem"	3:09
2.	"Sicker"	2:53
3.	"Party By Myself"	3:04
4.	"Get Out Of My Car"	3:59
5.	"I'm Not Sorry"	3:12
6.	"I'm A Human"	3:25
7.	"Frankie's Second Hand"	2:58
8.	"Fake It"	3:15
9.	"What Do We Care?"	2:58
10.	"Ugly Baby"	2:52
11.	"Loud Music"	2:08
12.	"Save It for Later"	2:49
13.	"One Step Away"	2:55
Total length:		39:42

== Personnel ==
Flashlight Brown

- Matt Hughes – lead vocals, guitar
- Fil Bucchino – bass guitar, vocals, keys, guitars
- Tim Thomson – drums
- Mike Conroy – guitar (tracks 1–10)

Production

- Dave Bassett – producer
- Allison Hamamura – A&R
- Bill Appleberry – piano (tracks 4 & 6), wurlitzer (track 7)
- Errin Famillia – assistant engineer
- David J. Holman – mixing
- Andy VanDette – mastering
