= Shades of Culture =

Canadian musical group

- Origin: Montreal, Quebec, Canada
- Genres: Rap
- Years active: 1992–2003
- Labels: 2112 Records; Union
- Members: Dark Shade, Revolution, DJ Storm
- Past members: DJ Choice, Kra-Z-Noize

Shades of Culture was a Canadian hip hop trio from Montreal. Its members are known as DShade, Revolution, and DJ Storm. The group performs mainly in English. Shades of Culture was one of the first Quebec hip hop groups to become known outside of their province.

== History ==
The trio was started in 1991 in Montreal. They won the Big Break competition in 1992, and then recorded record several demo tapes .

Shades of Culture participated in a number of Canadian tours with U.S. and Canadian bands, including Bad Brains, (The Almighty) Trigger Happy, SNFU, and Ten Foot Pole. After performing regularly for three years, the trio recorded an EP entitled Paying Rent. This three song demo also included a video which aired regularly across Canada.

After completing their fourth tour across Canada, the trio released their first full-length CD entitled Mindstate in 1998, and later several 12" singles with Mr. Len and DJ A-Trak. They also released a self-titled "Mindstate" single featuring Desi DiLauro. Their video aired regularly on Muchmusic, MusiquePlus, BET and MTV. The trio band subsequently took several short tours around Quebec with pop group Backstreet Boys. They also opened for Eminem, Gang Starr, KRS-One, The Beatnuts, Ben Harper, Onyx, and Jurassic 5.

In 2000, one of their songs was included on the compilation album State of the Union.

Shades of Culture were DMC Competition Judges in 1998 and 1999. They appeared in the movie Hang the DJ and worked on the sound effects and music score for Wesley Snipes' movie Art of War. They were included in The Source magazine's article about the hip hop scene in Montreal, as well as in a segment about scratching on FOX Network's Popular Mechanics for Kids.

In 2003, the group opened for The Roots at their Montreal concert.

The trio conducted a seminar on scratching and sampling at "Les Rencontres", and were on the first cover of Vice Magazine (then called Voice of Montreal).

== Discography ==
- 1996 Payin' Rent (EP)
- 1998 Mindstate
- 2000 A Little Bit About Us
- 2002 Unbreakable/D.I.Y (double single)
