= Art Electric =

Studio album by The Hunters
- Released: May 13, 2014
- Recorded: June 2013 at Atlas Studios in Chicago, Illinois
- Genres: Punk rock, Rock
- Length: 30:25
- Labels: Stomp Records (Canada), Black Numbers (United States), Flix Records (Europe)
- Producer: Matt Allison

The Hunters chronology
Promises (2012)	Art Electric (2014)

Art Electric is the third full-length album by Canadian rock band The Hunters. The album was released on May 13, 2014 on Stomp Records, Black Numbers, Flix Records.

The quartet reached out to its fans in 2013 to help them fund their album using crowdfunding platform Indiegogo.

The album was recorded by Matt Allison at Atlas Studios in Chicago.

== Track listing ==
All lyrics are written by Raphaël Potvin and Dominic Pelletier; all music is composed by The Hunters.

No.	Title	Length
1.	"Dave Grohl"	2:00
2.	"Hold On, Marci"	2:50
3.	"Roadworn Heart"
4.	"Connecticut"	3:35
5.	"Runaway"	2:43
6.	"Heroes"	3:42
7.	"Promises"
8.	"Hurricane Song"	3:10
9.	"Lighthouse"	2:53
10.	"Postcards & Golden Lovers"
11.	"It Had to Be You"	3:22
12.	"Basement Remedy"	3:00

== Personnel ==
The Hunters

- Dominic Pelletier – lead vocals, guitar
- Danahé Rousseau-Côté – guitar
- Raphaël Potvin – bass guitar, vocals
- William Duguay-Drouin – drums, percussion
