= My Degeneration (disambiguation) =

My Degeneration is a 2003 album by the punk rock band Flashlight Brown.

My Degeneration may also refer to:

- "My Degeneration", a 1966 single by The Eyes
- "My Degeneration", a single by Moke
- My Degeneration: Electronics 1974-1983, an album by Pascal Comelade
- My Degeneration, a 1989 film by Jon Moritsugu
