= Mindstate (Shades of Culture album) =

Studio album by Shades of Culture
- Released: May 1, 1998
- Recorded: 1997−1998
- Genre: Rap, hip hop
- Label: 2112 (Canada); TOT-11-2 (CD)

Shades of Culture chronology
Payin' Rent EP (1996)	Mindstate (1998)	A Little Bit About Us (2000)

Professional ratings
Review scores
Source	Rating
AllMusic	4.5/5 stars
The Gazette	8/10

Mindstate is the debut album by the Canadian hip hop group Shades of Culture, released in 1998.

== Critical reception ==
The Gazette wrote that "Shades venture into some jazz-tinged territory, Jamaican places, sparse rhythm beds and cocktail lounges, with contributions from 'hood heroes like champion turntablist A-Trak and Dubmatique's DJ Choice."

AllMusic called the album "an uplifting, lyrically vibrant offering that employs turntable scratching and human beat box techniques laid over a foundation of rich instrumentation."

== Track listing ==
1. "Intro"
2. "First Things First" (featuring Takktics)
3. "Think Twice" (featuring DJ A-Trak)
4. "The Island I'm From"
5. "(E.P. Interlude)"
6. "Do the Math"
7. "Main Objective"
8. "The Revolution"
9. "(E.P. Interlude)"
10. "Payin Rent II" (featuring Kandu)
11. "(E.P. Interlude)"
12. "Shine" (featuring Mr. Len)
13. "Mindstate" (featuring Desi Dilauro)
14. "(E.P. Interlude)
15. "What It Is"
