= Dancing for Decadence =

Studio album by The Sainte Catherines
- Released: March 21, 2006
- Genre: Punk rock
- Length: 29:49
- Label: Fat Wreck

The Sainte Catherines chronology
The Art of Arrogance (2003)	Dancing for Decadence (2006)	The Soda Machine (2007)

Professional ratings
Review scores
Source	Rating
AllMusic	3/5 stars
PunkNews	3.5/5 stars

Dancing for Decadence is the fourth studio album by Montreal based punk band The Sainte Catherines. It was released in 2006 on Fat Wreck Chords.

== Track listing ==
No.	Title	Length
1.	"Burn Guelph Burn"	2:53
2.	"Ring of Fire = 4 Points"	2:31
3.	"Confession of a Revolutionary Bourgeois Part 3"	2:31
4.	"Get Your Politics Out of My Hair"	2:13
5.	"Hau Weg Die Scheisse"	2:29
6.	"Emo-Ti-Cons: Punk Rock Experts"	1:47
7.	"The Shape of Drunks to Come"	3:21
8.	"I’d Rather Be Part of the Dying Bungee Scene"	2:40
9.	"Us Against the Music"	2:29
10.	"If There’s Black Smoke Over a Bridge, It’s Over"	2:18
11.	"International Badminton Championship: La P’Tite Grise vs. Jef"	1:42
12.	"Track & Field Style"	2:54
