= The Hunters (punk rock band) =

Canadian punk rock band

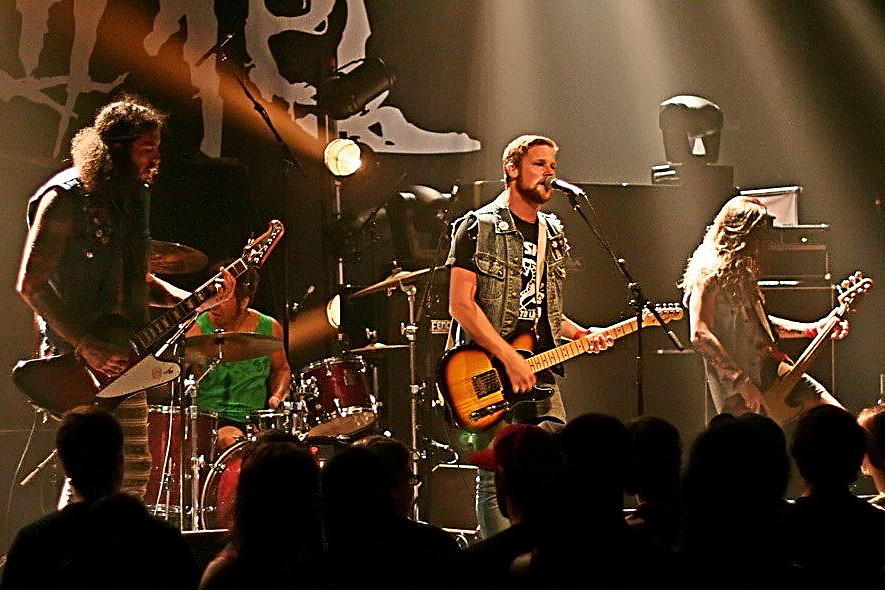
- The Hunters performing at EXO Fest on August 2, 2012 in Quebec City

Background information
- Also known as: Les Chasseurs
- Origin: Quebec City, Quebec, Canada
- Genres: Punk rock Alternative rock Ska punk (earlier)
- Years active: 2006 – 2016
- Labels: Stomp Records (Canada); Black Numbers (United States); Flix Records (Europe)
- Members: Dominic Pelletier; Raphaël Potvin; William Duguay-Drouin
- Past members: Alexandre Hébert-Vincent; Danahé Rousseau-Côté
- Website: thehuntersmusic.com

The Hunters are a Canadian punk rock band from Quebec City. Since their formation in 2006, The Hunters have toured extensively in Canada, as well as the US East Coast and Europe.

== History ==
Their first full-length, Dissent Lasts..., has been released independently in 2008.

In June 2010, Alexandre Hébert-Vincent was replaced by Danahé Rousseau-Côté on the guitar.

On March 8, 2012, Stomp Records announced they were adding the band to their roster and releasing the second album, Promises, on April 17.

The music video for the first single off Promises, "Van Party Forever" was released on June 5 and features the band playing with The Sainte Catherines during their farewell tour.

The foursome toured and promoted their latest album in the United States in November and December 2012. They played their 300th show in September, just before their performance at The Fest in Gainesville, Florida, on October 26.

The second music video, "Faux-Fire, Faux-Gold", consists of footage of the band during the trip to The Fest and the car ride back to dodge Hurricane Sandy.

A documentary webseries about Promises promotional tour was released in January 2013. Titled Driving on Promises, the ten episodes cover the whole tour through Quebec and Ontario. It is based on their roadie's log book.

The foursome toured Europe in February and March 2013, more precisely through Austria, Czech Republic, France, Germany, and Switzerland.

They started recording their third studio album on June 18, 2013, with Matt Allison at Atlas Studios in Chicago, Illinois. The title, Art Electric, has been revealed on the Indiegogo funding page mid-June.

== Members ==
- Dominic Pelletier (Guitar, vocals)
- Raphaël Potvin (Bass)
- William Duguay-Drouin (drums)

=== Past members ===
- Danahé Rousseau-Côté (Guitar)

== Discography ==
=== Albums ===
- Dissent Lasts... (Self-released, 2008)
- Promises (Stomp Records, 2012)
- Art Electric (Stomp Records/Black Numbers/Flix Records, 2013)

=== EPs ===
- Split with Miracles (L'Écurie, 2013)

== Videography ==
=== Music videos ===
- "Sing Out!" (2010)
- "Van Party Forever" (2012)
- "Faux-Fire, Faux-Gold" (2012)

=== Documentary ===
- "Driving on Promises" (2013)
