= Flashlight Brown =

Canadian punk rock band

- Flashlight Brown in 2003. From left to right: Fil Bucchino, Tim Thomson, Matt Hughes, and Mike Conroy

Background information
- Also known as: Flashlight (1995-2001)
- Origin: Guelph, Ontario, Canada
- Genres: Punk rock; pop punk; alternative rock; ska punk; pop rock
- Years active: 1995–2007 (Note: One-off reunion in 2011)
- Labels: Stomp; Double A; Sonic Unyon; Union 2112; Hollywood; Warner
- Past members: Fil Bucchino; Matt Hughes; Tim Thomson; Bart Doroz; Mike Conroy; Marky Buffone; Tristan O'Malley
- Website: flashlightbrown.com (link currently broken)

Flashlight Brown were a Canadian punk rock band, originally from Guelph. They were formed in 1995. At the time, they were just known as Flashlight. The band's most known lineup consisted of vocalist/guitarist Matt Hughes, bassist/vocalist Fil Bucchino, drummer Tim Thomson, and guitarist Mike Conroy. They're known for their singles "Ready To Roll" and "I'm A Human", as well as their cover of "Save It for Later". Their music received some airtime on radio and TV stations in Canada (such as MuchMusic) and has been featured in Rugrats Go Wild, Smallville, and Sky High.

== Biography ==
=== Early years (1995–2001) ===
Bucchino, Hughes, and Thomson formed a band, then simply called "Flashlight", in 1995 out of boredom and frustration and quickly moved from the small college town of Guelph to the much larger Toronto, Ontario. At first, they were unable to get the attention of nightclub owners, so they devised a fictitious talent agency, called the Harry Wells Booking Agency, which would "represent" them. With the agency as their intermediate, they quickly gained enough recognition to go on tour. In 1996, they released their first cassette, Blindsided.

They began touring across Canada in a van. In 1997, they managed to release a self-titled debut album with guitarist Tristan O'Malley through the Quebec-based Stomp Records, which they would follow up with the Running Season LP two years later with Marky Buffone through Sonic Unyon and the band's own Double A Records. During this time they also managed to film a video for their song "Sonia Bianchi", which received air time on MuchMusic.

By 2001, the band had established a national touring schedule and had added the word "Brown" to their name, after some pressure from a 1970s funk band called "Flashlight". They then released another self-titled album under the new name, with guitarist Mikey Conroy through Union 2112 (the new version of Stomp, which had recently merged with 2112 Records).

=== Major label years (2002–2007) ===
Midway through their 2002 tour, the band was contacted by Rob Cavallo (of Green Day fame), a man who was admired by the band members. Cavallo flew the band to Los Angeles, originally to record a two-song demo, but this quickly turned into a record deal with Hollywood Records. In April 2003, the band released their major label debut, My Degeneration, an album they deemed to be a "culmination of a 6 year career of living on the edge between a dream and despair". The album featured many re-recorded, old favorites along with some new material. Around the same time, the band recorded a cover of The Clash's "Should I Stay or Should I Go" for the Rugrats Go Wild! soundtrack, but the track was replaced with "Ready To Roll" instead. The band then released this song online on a secret page of their website.

In 2003, the band played over 200 dates in North America. They played various popular festivals such as Warped Tour, Lollapalooza and Snow Jam. In early 2004, they appeared on The Toronto Show.

In 2005, it was announced that they would be recording a new album with Hollywood Records called Blue. The album was completed in early 2006 and the band released two songs, "Save It for Later" (which was later included on the soundtrack for Sky High) and "I'm a Human" (later included on Smallville), on their website. In March, the album was then released in advance on iTunes. The album's release date was then set for June 6.

In April 2006, it was announced by Matt Hughes on the Flashlight Brown forums that Mike Conroy would be leaving the band for personal reasons. Bart Doroz, formerly of The Getaway, was brought in to replace him on guitar. Conroy later joined the band Zuku.

When June came around, Blue's release was delayed for undisclosed reasons. The nature of the delay has still been left to speculation, however, in early July the band's website went down and redirected to their Myspace page, which had the following message posted:

"Hi all. Due to extreme differences of opinion, we are no longer with Hollywood Records. These circumstances have forced us to cancel all our summer touring. Apologies to all, especially to those who have been patiently waiting for the release of a record that is 3 years overdue. The record will come out soon and we will let you know when it becomes available in your country. Thanks for being there for us and we can't wait to play again in your hometown."

On October 30, 2006, the band announced on their MySpace that the album would be released the next day, Halloween, in Canada. A video for the song "Sicker" was later filmed. In a generally favourable review, Chart magazine wrote, "It's the kind of pop-rock that isn't merely catchy, it's rewarding after repeated listens." Exclaim!'s review was more negative, saying, "While the energy and enthusiasm put forth on tracks such as "Sicker", "Get Out Of My Car" and "Party By Myself" is admirable, there’s a distinct stench of immaturity here that detracts from the overall product."

=== Inactivity and other projects (2007–present) ===
The band performed for MTV sometime in early 2007, and, shortly afterwards. went inactive. On March 5, 2011, the band played a show with Ian D'Sa from Billy Talent on guitar at the Horseshoe Tavern in Toronto, before going inactive again. In late 2014, the band's website was put up for sale.

In 2008, both Bucchino and Hughes produced The Johnstones' EP, Sex.

In 2019, Bucchino produced a documentary titled Obsessed With Olive Oil, which follows "a former punk rock musician turned olive oil expert on his annual quest to Italy in search of exceptional extra virgin olive oils that will change your life and transform your dish." Bucchino currently operates his own line of extra virgin olive oil under "Abandoned Grove".

From 2018 to 2021, Hughes uploaded the entire discography, including rarities, to his YouTube channel. In 2023, Hughes started making music again under "Ugly Things".

== Discography ==
=== Studio albums ===
- :flashlight. (1997)
- Running Season (1999)
- Flashlight Brown (2001)
- My Degeneration (2003)
- Blue (2006)

=== Extended plays ===
- Blindsided (1996)
- A Freak (2000)
- FlashlightBrown MadCaddies (Split EP with Mad Caddies) (2002)
- All That Glitters Is Mold (2002)
- Soft Acoustic Hits (2018)
- Playdead (2018)
- Lanni (2018)

=== Compilations ===
- Fuck Hollywood (2018)

=== Videography ===
- Sonia Bianchi (1999)
- EPK (2001)
- Ready To Roll (2003)
- Sicker (2007)

== Band members ==
=== Final lineup ===
- Matt Hughes – vocals, rhythm guitar (1995–2007, 2011)
- Fil Bucchino – bass guitar, vocals, keyboards (1995–2007, 2011)
- Bart Doroz – lead guitar (2006–2007)
- Tim Thomson – drums (1995–2007, 2011)

=== Former ===
- Mike Conroy – lead guitar (1999–2006)
- Marky Buffone - lead guitar (1998–1999)
- Tristan O'Malley - lead guitar, vocals (1995–1998)

=== Touring ===
- Andrew McMullen - drums (1998–1999)
- Ian D'Sa - lead guitar (2011)
