= Subb =

Canadian band

- Origin: Saint-Jean-sur-Richelieu, Quebec, Canada
- Genres: Punk rock; ska punk; hardcore punk; reggae
- Years active: 1992–2010, 2015
- Labels: Stomp; One Big Family Records; Underworld Records
- Members: Jeff Quesnel; Mart Charron; Math Goyette; Stef Gauthier; JF Lague
- Past members: Nick Poissant; Jeepy Paiement; John Génier; Chris Roy; Fred Gagné
- Website: www.subbcentral.com

Subb was a Canadian ska punk band which was formed in November 1992 in Saint-Jean-sur-Richelieu, a suburb of Montreal, Quebec. The band released four full-length albums, one EP and one split CD on Stomp and Underworld Records during the early 1990s. Although they experienced several lineup changes over the years, founding members Mart Charron and Stef Gauthier remained in the group. The band's musical style initially blended elements of punk rock, ska, and hardcore into a genre popularly known as ska punk or "ska-core," which characterized their first two albums. In 2002, they moved away from this sound and produced an album with a heavy pop-punk influence. After a brief hiatus in 2003, the band returned to their ska, punk, and hardcore elements.

== History ==
=== 1992–1995: Early years ===
Subb formed in 1992 in Saint-Jean-sur-Richelieu, Quebec, as Society Under Babbling Boobs (S.U.B.B.). The band's original lineup consisted of Mart Charron on vocals and guitar, Fred Gagné on lead guitar, Stef Gauthier on bass, and Chris Roy on drums. This lineup lasted for two years, until Gagné and Roy left the group in 1994. Jeepy Paiement joined the band in December 1994 as their new drummer.

=== 1996–1999: Underworld Records ===
Subb met singer Jeff Quesnel in 1995, and Quesnel's arrival was a turning point in the band's future sound. Later that year, John Génier took over from Paiement on drums and was soon succeeded by Nick Poissant. Around that time, Subb signed with Montreal-based Underworld Records. 1996 saw the arrival of second guitarist Math Goyette and the release of their first CD, Two ban' an' a split, a split album with friends Thirdfall. Poissant left the band in September 1997, and was replaced by JF Lague. Their first full-length release The Highstep to Hell was released in December of that year. The song "Mister Gun" soon became a fan favourite, and the band supported the album's release by touring Canada. Subbb released an EP, Like Kids in a Field, in November 1998.

=== 2000–2002: Stomp Records ===
In September 1999, Subb signed with Stomp Records; the following March, they released Until the Party Ends. The band toured extensively that year to support the album. After participating in the national Vans State of the Union Tour with labelmates Reset and Men O' Steel, they played the Montreal and Toronto stops of the Vans Warped Tour.

In early 2001, Subb performed at the MusiquePlus Jam des neiges 2001 with Orgy and Crazy Town. They then toured Switzerland and Germany for three weeks before embarking on a coast-to-coast Canadian tour with the Planet Smashers. The band appeared at the Vans Warped Tour dates in Montreal and Toronto and hosted a sold-out launch event at Montreal's Spectrum for the re-release of The Ultimate Highstep to Hell.

Daylight Saving, Subb's third album, was recorded in 2002. Subb headlined the Molson Dry/Musique Plus 123 Punk Tour in April and May. During the summer, they performed at the Ramprage event with Pennywise and played three dates (Boston, Montreal, and Toronto) on the Vans Warped Tour on the Union Stage. Subb released three videos from this album: "Daylight Saving" (the title track), "Twenty-One," and "Out of the Line." "Twenty-One" received airplay on Musique Plus, Much Music and MuchLoud, and "Out of the Line" was added to the rotation on MuchLoud. In late 2002, Subb toured Quebec and Ontario with Bigwig and Jettison.

=== 2003–2010: Stomp Records again ===
After a brief hiatus in early 2003, Subb worked on new songs for the next two years. In April 2006, The Motions was released. Their fourth full-length album was recorded at Montreal's Piccolo Studios and produced by Frank Joly. Subb also toured extensively that year, participating in the national GRIND tour in May with Mad Caddies, Satanic Surfers, The Loved Ones and labelmates The Resistance. During the summer, they played several dates in Quebec and Ontario to support the new album and played the Toronto and Montreal stops of the Vans Warped Tour.

In 2007, they were invited by the Vulgaires Machins for a series of shows. With Akuma also on the bill, the tour played throughout February, March and April. The Motions was released in Japan on One Big Family Records in April, and the band was invited to tour Japan. The album To This Beat was released on May 2, 2009, on Stomp Records. They enlisted Jah Cutta to dive deeper into the roots of ska music with tributes to their hometown ("I Heart Montreal") and reggae music and culture ("Shottas & Mount Zion").

The band went on another hiatus in December 2009, and announced that they were disbanding in early spring 2010. One last tour was announced, and a record with demos, rarities, and dubs was expected that September. The Zero To Zero Tour '10 played from September to November 2010, and the band participated in the October Montreal Ska Festival. Subb gave their last performance on November 20 in their hometown, Saint-Jean-sur-Richelieu.

=== Life after Subb (2018) ===
In 2018, Jeff Quesnel and guitarist Mart Charron formed Bring the Light after realizing that they shared a strong desire to create melodic hardcore. They recruited Nick Poissant on drums, Vincent Gauthier on bass and Frank Chartrand on guitar soon afterwards, completing the band's lineup.

== Band members ==
Subb lineups
1992–1994 Live shows	Mart Charron – vocals and guitar; Fred Gagné – guitar and vocals; Stef Gauthier – bass; Chris Roy – drums
1995 Demo	Mart Charron – vocals and guitar; Stef Gauthier – bass and vocals; Jeepy Paiement – drums
1995 Live shows	Jeff Quesnel – vocals; Mart Charron – vocals and guitar; Stef Gauthier – bass and vocals; John Génier – drums
1996–1997 Two ban' an' a split The Highstep to hell	Jeff Quesnel – vocals; Mart Charron – vocals and guitar; Stef Gauthier – bass and vocals; Nick Poissant – drums; Math Goyette – guitar
1997–2010 Like Kids in a Field Until the Party ends Daylight Saving The Motions To This Beat Zero To Zero	Jeff Quesnel – vocals; Mart Charron – vocals and guitar; Stef Gauthier – bass and vocals; JF Lague – drums; Math Goyette – guitar

Band member timeline

== Discography ==
=== Albums ===
Year	Title	Label	Other information
1997	The Highstep To Hell	Underworld Records	Recorded at Studio Nicko
2000	Until the Party Ends	Stomp Records	Recorded at Studio Nicko
2002	Daylight Saving	Stomp Records	Recorded at Studio Morin Heights
2006	The Motions	Stomp Records	Recorded at Studio Piccolo
2009	To This Beat	Stomp Records	Recorded at Studio Momentum
2010	Zero to Zero	Stomp Records	Digital release only

=== EPs ===
Year	Title	Label	Other information
1996	Two ban' an' split	Underworld	Split release with Thirdfall. 6 Subb songs. Out of print.
1998	Like Kids in a Field	Underworld Records	7 songs CD. Out of print.

=== Demos ===
Year	Title	Label	Other information
1995	Period (demo)	Suck it Records	First and only demo released. 10 songs. 800 copies produced. Out of print.
