= Transitions (Westbound Train album) =

Studio album by Westbound Train
- Released: September 26, 2006
- Genre: Ska
- Label: Hellcat Records

Westbound Train chronology
Five to Two (2005)	Transitions (2006)	Come and Get It (2009)

Professional ratings
Review scores
Source	Rating
Punknews.org	4/5 stars

Transitions is the third album of Boston-based Ska band Westbound Train. It is their first release for Hellcat Records.

== Track listing ==
1. "Transition 1" (0:54)
2. "Please Forgive Me" (3:53)
3. "Good Enough" (4:27)
4. "For The First Time" (3:25)
5. "The Test" (4:33)
6. "Sorry Mama" (4:42)
7. "I'm No Different" (4:16)
8. "Gone" (3:46)
9. "The Runaround" (4:08)
10. "Seven Ways To Sunday" (4:37)
11. "Soul Revival" (3:57)
12. "Transition 2" (0:40)
13. "I Feel Fine" (4:39)
14. "Fatty Boom Boom" (3:44)
15. "When I Die" (4:12)
16. "Travel On" (6:02)
