= La Severa Matecera =

La Severa Matacera
- Origin: Bogotá, Colombia
- Genres: Ska; Reggae; Funk; Colombian Rock
- Years active: 1996-Present
- Labels: Kalppa Records; LSM
- Members: Alejandro veloza Alex Arce; Gomer Ramirez; Juan Felipe Pinzon
- Website: Official website

La Severa Matacera is a Colombian musical group, formed in Bogotá, at the end of 1995, with the idea of forming a band which could mix all the influences of its members (ska, reggae and funk mostly).

== History ==
Their first demo-tape, “Inmunidad”, was published in Mexico, by an independent label called Pepelobo Rekords, in 1999. La Severa Matacera then participated in two compilation albums for the Hispanic-America market. In 2002, they released an album called “Cuando La Gente Se Pare”, on the Colombian labels Hormagaloca Producciones, and MTM Records Colombia. This album has 13 tracks, which include invited musicians: Desorden Público, of Venezuela, and Los Yerberos, of Mexico. "Cuando la gente se pare" was recorded in Rec. Studio, Bogotá, between May and September, 2001, co-produced by sound engineers Mocho and Kabeto; mixed and mastered by Santiago Ochoa at 8A's Psychotropic Home Studio; and with art work by Sebastián Moyano.

The year 2005 started with the band issuing an EP, called Energia Positiva, which includes 3 songs that would be part of their new album; the band decided to publish this work on their own indie label, LSM records. On October 5, the band was given the Best Ska Reggae Band Award, by Colombia's "SHOCK MAGAZINE".

== Touring ==
In February 2006, the band travelled to Los Angeles, California to start their exhaustive 10th Anniversary Tour, performing at the most renowned stages in Los Angeles, such as House of Blues, The Knitting Factory, and The Temple Bar. The band also performed in Anaheim, Orange County, with the Mexican rock star, Sara Valenzuela, and opened the tour for The Aggrolites, in San Francisco, with several SKA bands from the Bay Area. In July, the band was invited to be the main act at the 7th Annual Victoria Ska Fest, in Canada. To finish the tour, the band went to New York, where they performed 3 times at Club Midway, in Manhattan, and Terraza, in Queens. During the last 2 months of the tour, they began work on a new album, at Ventana Studios, in downtown Los Angeles.

The band returned to Colombia in September, 2006, to start a national tour at the Rock al Parque festival, Bogota, to an audience of over 100,000, as the opening act for the French artist Manu Chao, and then played for a 20,000 audience, in Medellín, as the opening act for Californian band Total Chaos.

In 2007, the band released a 4 song E.P. which includes the best of the California Tour 2006; and then returned to the U.S., to finish the mixing and mastering of the new album, at the Version City Studios, in New Brunswick, New Jersey; under the direction of the ska reggae producer King Django, who has worked with bands such as Stubborn All Stars, and Slackers. A second tour of the U.S. was promoted with Pachamama Culture, and Sail Away Collective, from June 30 to August 11, visiting New York, New Jersey, Chicago, Albuquerque, San Francisco, Los Angeles, Seattle, and the Discovery Islands in British Columbia, Canada.

== Main act ==
"La Severa Matecera" was the main act of the 2008 Festival FFF, in Ambato, Ecuador, with artists from France, and the best bands from Quito y Guayaquil. The band then released their third album, V.I.S.A., in 2008, under independent label, Kalppa Records. Their next album, Paranoia was released in 2011, again on Kalppa records. There followed a collaboration with Lafrontino for the single, Light it Up in 2013, and the next year the band released another single ,From the Mountain. They were the headline act at the 2013 Rock al Parque festival, in Bogota, Colombia. Another festival performance was at "The Car Audio Rock Festival", in January, 2016 -one of Colombia's main rock festivals.

== Awards ==
- VIDEODROMO(2003) Winner for "Best Ska Video"

(Cuando la gente se pare)

- Tricolrock(2004) Winner for "Best Song"

(Destino)

- SHOCK Awards (2005) Winner "Best Ska Band"
- Subbterranica Winner for "Best Ska Band"

(2007)

== Members ==
- Alejandro Veloza (Guitar)
- Juan Felipe Pinzon (Sax)
- Alex Arce (Lead Vocals and R. Guitar)
- Gomer Ramirez (Drums)

== Discography ==
- Immunidad - Pepe Lobo Records (1999),
- Cuando la gente se pare - album Hormigaloca-MTM Records Colombia (2002),
- Energia positiva -LSM Records (2005),
- California Tour 2006 - LSM Records (2007),
- V.I.S.A. - album Kalppa Records(2008)
- Paranoia- album Kalppa Records (2011)
- Light it Up- single with Lafrantino Kalppa Records
- From the Mountain - single (2014)
