= Come Get It =

Come Get It may refer to:

- Come Get It!, an album by Rick James
- Come Get It: The Very Best of Aaron Carter, an album
- "Come Get It", a song by The Chipmunks from Alvin and the Chipmunks: Original Motion Picture Soundtrack
- "Come Get It", a song by Yummy Bingham from The First Seed

== See also ==
- Come and Get It (disambiguation)
