= The Kingpins (Canadian band) =

Canadian ska band

- Origin: Montreal, Quebec, Canada
- Genre: Ska
- Years active: 1994–2004
- Label: Stomp
- Past members: Eric Boulanger (founding member); Jordan Swift (founding member); Ian Hodkinson (founding member); Lorraine Muller (founding member); Vượng Đào; Bobby Beaton; Nigel Goddard; Jesse Radz; Maithe Robert de Massis; Paddy Walsh; Nish Herat; David Jager; John Jordan; Dave "JFK" Adams; Chris Pung; Mitch "King Kong" Gírio; Josh Fuhrman; Johnny Trudel; Mike Gasselsdorfer; Daryl Meili; Chris Raz; Dan Meier; Sean Scanlan; Oliver Crow; Russ Cooper; Liam O'Neil (guest); Josh Katz-Rosene (guest); Andy King (guest); Gord Hyland
- Website: www.thekingpins.com

The Kingpins featuring Lorraine Muller - The Queen of Ska was a ska band from Montreal, Quebec that created Stomp Records label with fellow Montreal Ska band The Planet Smashers. The last Kingpins tour took place in 2004, after which the members of the band reformed under the name Lo and the Magnetics founded by Muller in order to reflect the drastic line-up changes (and musical changes) that had taken place since the band's inception in 1994. During their ten-year reign, the band toured extensively in Canada, the U.S., France, Germany, Switzerland, Belgium, Italy, and Japan. They are known for their danceable ska rhythms, and their catchy song-writing abilities in both English and French.

== History ==
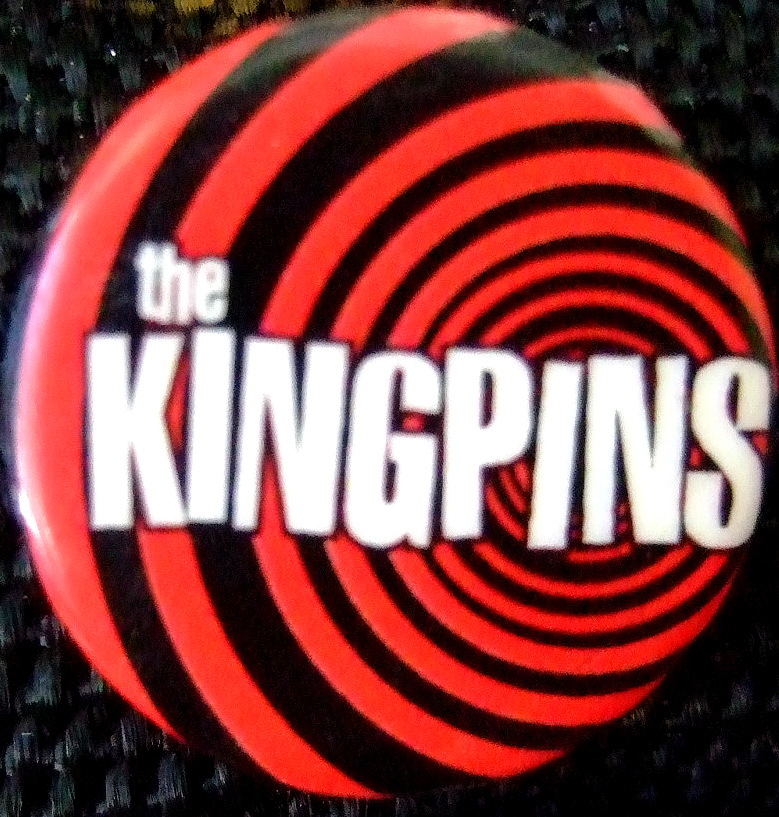
Official The Kingpins logo

The group formed in 1994 by founding members of the Kingpins: Eric "Boum Boum" Boulanger on drums, Jordan Swift on bass, Ian "Hot Tub" Hodkinson on organ, and Lorraine Muller on alto saxophone (later given the nickname "The Queen of Ska" by Bobby Beaton, she went on to play tenor and baritone saxes, and eventually became the lead singer.)

The band's first big break came with the release of their first single, "On the Run", written by Hodkinson and Muller which garnered them the 1995 Montreal Independent Music Industry award in the category of Best Single. The single was released with two B-sides, "Spy vs. Spy" (a cover) and "Leave My Girlfriend Alone" (by Nigel Goddard, alto sax). The Montréal ska scene took notice and Kingpins shows attracted increasingly larger crowds. The wave of support was continued with the release of the band's first full-length album Watch Your Back in 1997, but it wasn't until 1999 that they broke out into the mainstream media with the release of their second album Let's Go To Work, a more traditional-based ska album. The success of the second album led to major exposure, such as performances on the Warped Tour, at the Montreal Jazz Festival and extensive touring in Europe.

The third and final album under the Kingpins' name was Plan of Action, released in September 2000. This album represented a major shift in the Kingpins' musical direction. Vocal duties were taken over almost exclusively by Lorraine Muller, one of the band's original members. Before the release of Plan of Action, Muller was primarily responsible for playing baritone saxophone and singing vocals on a few songs. The band also experimented with different stylistic fusions, mixing ska with various other musical genres, including new wave and breakbeat. The album also featured guest appearances by many big names in the Canadian ska scene, including Dave "JFK" Adams of JFK & the Conspirators, and Mitch "King Kong" Girio of King Apparatus fame. Though these were drastic changes, the album was well received.

The group toured on and off over the next four years, but by 2004, the band's line-up included only one original member (Muller), and the group announced on October 28, 2004, that their next album would be released under the name Lo and the Magnetics. At the time of their "breakup", the Kingpins consisted of Lorraine Muller on lead vocals and saxophone, Chris Raz on guitar, Dan Meier on saxophone, Russ Cooper on bass, and Mike Gasselsdorfer on drums. In concert, Lo and the Magnetics occasionally played songs that were released under the Kingpins' name, though they referred to them as "covers". They have, however, retired some of the Kingpins' most notable songs, such as "The 10 Commandments of Ska". The Magnetics are on hiatus and expect to record some demos at some point.

== Discography ==
- On the Run (1995) (CD single)
- Watch Your Back (1997)
- Lootin' Shootin' and Wailin' (7" vinyl single)
- Let's Go to Work (1999)
- Plan of Action (2000)

== Compilation appearances ==
- "Spy vs. Spy" on The All-Skanadian Club Vol. 1 (Stomp Records 1996)
- "Watch Your Back" on The All-Skanadian Club Vol. 2 (Stomp Records 1996)
- "Johnny Ratchet" on The All-Skanadian Club Vol. 3 (Stomp Records 1997)
- "Manon Viens Danser Le Ska" on 2Tongue: le Québec en montre une! (Disques Sapristi!)
- "Ball of Fire" (with The Pilfers) and "Give it to Me Now" on Oi!/Skampilation Vol. 3 (Radical Records)
- "Bed Rock Twitch" on FlashBack (Discos del Toro 2000)
- "Plan of Action" on Forty One Sixty (JAM Records 2009)

== Videography ==
- Supernova
- Consequence
- Bordel
- Manon Viens Danser le Ska (1999)
