= Come and Get It (Westbound Train album) =

Studio album by Westbound Train
- Released: April 21, 2009
- Recorded: 2008–2009
- Genre: Ska
- Length: 54:29
- Label: Hellcat Records
- Producer: Dave Hillyard

Westbound Train chronology
Transitions (2006)	Come and Get It (2009)

Come and Get It is the fourth album from Boston-based Ska band Westbound Train. It is their second release for Hellcat Records. It was released on April 21, 2009.

== Track listing ==
All tracks are written by Westbound Train.

No.	Title	Length
1.	"I Don't Belong Here"	3:04
2.	"Ain't Gonna Be Easy"	3:02
3.	"Check Your Time"	3:41
4.	"Why You Cry"	2:28
5.	"Come And Get It"	2:54
6.	"Some Things Are Meant To Be Remembered"	3:41
7.	"Salvation"	4:18
8.	"If Only"	2:55
9.	"What You Need"	3:21
10.	"The Passage"	5:05
11.	"Lift My Voice Up Loud"	4:50
12.	"For The Record"	4:40
13.	"Many Things A Man Can Say"	4:01
14.	"Critical Ska"	3:36
15.	"Cheers! The World's Almost Over"	2:59
Total length:		54:29
