= The Operators (band) =

British rock band

- Origin: Isle of Wight, England
- Genres: Rock; Indie rock
- Years active: 2006–present
- Members: Owen Taylor (vocals); John Stevens (bass); Charles Westropp (guitar/synth); Ben Athley (drums)

The Operators are a British indie rock band. Their songs include "Mountain", "Just My Way" and "It Grinds".

== History ==
The band formed on the Isle of Wight in 2006 and after coming in second in the Wight Noize Auditions in June, won the opportunity to play at the Isle of Wight Festival. Their debut album 'What You See Is What I Sell' was self-released at the end of 2007 and in April 2008 their song "Pictures of You" won the 'Fresh Meat' competition on the Zane Lowe show, and was played every night that week on BBC Radio One. The band headlined The Band Stand on 12 June at the 2008 Isle of Wight Festival where they showcased material from their new album.

- The Operators performed on BalconyTV London in July 2011.
