= The Dreadnoughts =

Canadian folk-punk band

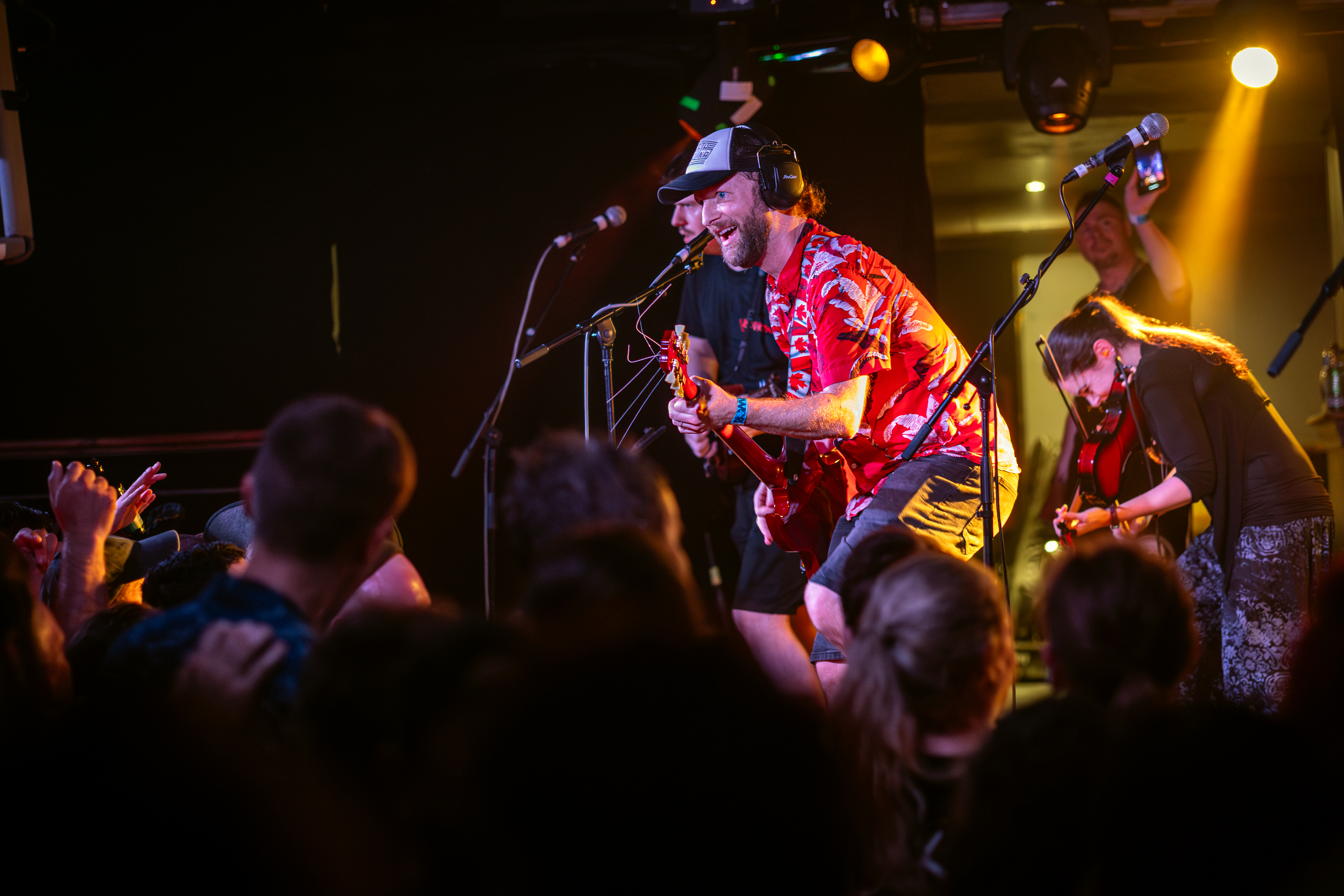
- The Dreadnoughts perform at The Underworld, London, UK, in July 2024

Background information
- Origin: Vancouver, British Columbia, Canada
- Genres: Folk punk, Celtic punk, Polka punk, gypsy punk, folk, sea shanty, folk rock, Scrumpy and Western
- Years active: 2006–present
- Label: Stomp
- Members: See Current Members
- Website: thedreadnoughts.com

The Dreadnoughts are a Canadian folk punk band from Vancouver. The band combines a wide range of European folk music with modern street punk. The band has eight full-length albums and three EPs on various labels, and has played around 500 shows in around 30 countries. They also used to perform before 2020 as a traditional polka band at polka festivals, under the name "Polka Time!". Their performance peak was in 2010, when 180 shows were played.

== History ==
The Dreadnoughts formed in 2006 in the Downtown Eastside area of Vancouver, British Columbia, Canada. They released their first album, Legends Never Die, in 2007, followed by their second album, Victory Square, in 2009. They wrote Victory Square as a tribute to their home city of Vancouver, and as such, many of the songs on the album focus on places of importance to the bandmembers. The Dreadnoughts promoted the album by touring all over Canada and Europe in 2009, a tour which inspired much of the material on their 2010 album Polka's Not Dead. The tour was documented in a book by Adam PW Smith, who would later produce a mini-documentary about the band as well.

In late 2011, after producing Polka's Not Dead, the band announced an indefinite hiatus. However, they followed this by playing shows occasionally, such as annual Vancouver shows, a two-week European tour in January 2014, and two March gigs with Guttermouth in 2014. On November 11, 2017, they released their fourth full-length album Foreign Skies, a folk-punk concept album about the First World War. They followed this up with the acoustic album Into The North on November 15, 2019. On March 13, 2023, the band released Green Willow, which consists entirely of folk-punk renditions of traditional folk songs (with the exception of the final track "Roll Northumbria"). While Green Wiilow was originally only released on digital platforms, the album had a limited production for physical release in 2024. On December 8, 2024, the band announced a new album, being "polka-heavy and shanty-heavy" later titled Polka Pit. Polka Pit released on September 19, 2025.

== Sound and influences ==
Noticeable influences in their sound include acts such as The Pogues, Brave Combo, Stan Rogers, Boiled in Lead, Gogol Bordello, Goran Bregovic, Dropkick Murphys, and Rancid. The band commonly records and perform sea shanties, polkas and klezmer songs, and are also strongly influenced by English Scrumpy and Western music - in particular the West Country bands The Wurzels and the Surfin' Turnips.

Their 2009 release, Victory Square, was ranked the 4th-best folk-punk release of 2009 by folk-punk magazine Shite N' Onions. Their previous release, Legends Never Die, was ranked #7 on the magazine's 2008 list. Multiple cross-Canada tours and European tours have helped to contribute to the band's steadily rising profile.

Other acts that have shared the stage with The Dreadnoughts include Stiff Little Fingers, The Cider Fecks, Swingin' Utters, Hepcat, The Real McKenzies, Goran Bregovic, IAMX, Okean Elzy, Talco, The Creepshow, Mad Sin, Los Furios, and Winzige Hosen.

== Current members ==
=== Recording members ===
- Nicolas Smyth - "Dad" (formerly known as "The Fang" and "Uncle Touchy"), guitar and vocals
- Kyle Taylor - "Leroy 'Slow Ride' McBride" (formerly known as "Seamus O'Flanahan" and "The Best Fiddle in the West"), accordion and fiddle
- Conrad Shynkar - "Steve", mandolin
- Andrew Hay - "Squid Vicious", bass
- Marco Bieri - "The Stupid Swedish Bastard", drums
- James Battle - "Jungle Jim", mandolin
- Paul Carrigan - "Pauly Shoreman", accordion
- Lou Johnson - "Lou-Dog", fiddle (formerly "King Louie")
- Enrique Soteldo - "Kiké", drums
- Brandon Malave - "Mr. Cream", bass

=== Touring members ===
- James Battle - "Jungle Jim", mandolin
- Paul Carrigan - "Pauly Shoreman", accordion
- Lou Johnson - "King Louie", fiddle
- Enrique Soteldo - "Kiké", drums
- Brandon Malave - "Mr. Cream", bass
- Aled Jenkins- "Karen" (formerly known as "Fuzznuts"), mandolin (recording member for Roll and Go) (formerly of Smokey Bastard)
- Momo, fiddle
- Mike Wood - "Cumulo Dingus", bass (formerly of Smokey Bastard)
- Sean McNab - "Potato Man", bass (also of The Creepshow)

=== Former members ===
- William Shand - "Fire Marshall Willy", bass (formerly of The Brass Action)
- Katie Nordgren - "The Wicked Wench of the West", bass
- Calliandra Sexmith - "The Dread Pirate Druzil" / "Bouzouki Joe", mandolin, Irish bouzouki, tenor banjo, whistle
- Tegan Ceschi-Smith - "Wormley Wangersnitch", fiddle
- Elise, fiddle

== Discography ==
=== Studio albums ===
- Legends Never Die – July 2007 (Golden Tee Records)
- Victory Square - June 2009 (Stomp Records)
- Polka's Not Dead - October 2010 (Stomp Records)
- Foreign Skies - November 2017 (Self Released)
- Into The North - November 2019 (Stomp Records)
- Roll And Go - June 2022 (Stomp Records)
- Green Willow - March 2023 (Initially Digital-Only with a limited physical release in 2024, Self Released)
- Polka Pit - September 2025 (Punkerton Records)

=== EPs ===
- Cyder Punks Unite - July 2010, (Leech Redda)
- Uncle Touchy Goes To College - July 2011 (Bellydrop Records)
- Foreign Skies (B Sides) - January 2018 (Self Released)

== See also ==
- List of bands from Canada
