= Westbound Train =

American ska band

- Origin: Boston, Massachusetts, United States
- Genres: Ska, Reggae, Soul
- Years active: 2001–present
- Labels: Megalith Records; Stomp Records; Hellcat Records
- Members: Obi Fernandez; Rich Graiko; Gideon Blumenthal; Thaddeus Merrit; Eric Novod; Carlos Menezes; Alex Stern; Alex Brumel
- Past members: Josh Cohen; Jesse Hayes; Michael Freeman; Jeff Pierce; Chaz Calvo; Chris Brunnelle; Henrik Holmlund; Tom Roslak; John DeCarlo; Luke Penella
- Website: Westboundtrain.net

Westbound Train is a ska band from Boston, Massachusetts, formed in 2001. Their name originates from the Dennis Brown hit song by the same name.

Westbound Train released their first album, Searching for A Melody, in 2002. The band self-released their second album, Five to Two, in 2005, which featured guest appearances from Alex Desert of Hepcat and King Django. The album was re-released by Stomp Records on March 14, 2006.

Westbound Train were featured on the Hellcat Records compilation Give 'Em the Boot IV in November 2004. In January 2006, Hellcat announced that they had signed the band. A third full-length, titled Transitions, was released in September 2006.

Westbound Train played the Summer of Ska tour in the summer of 2006, along with Suburban Legends, Big D and the Kids Table, Voodoo Glow Skulls, and Catch 22. Westbound Train also played the Fall of Ska tour in the fall of 2006, along with Reel Big Fish, Streetlight Manifesto, and Suburban Legends.

== Band members ==
- Obi Fernandez - Lead Vocals, Trombone
- Rich Graiko - Trumpet
- Carlos Menezes- Tenor Saxophone, flute
- Gideon Blumenthal - Piano, Organ, Backing Vocals
- Alex Brumel - Lead Guitar, Backing Vocals
- Alex Stern - Rhythm Guitar, Backing Vocals
- Thaddeus Merritt - Bass guitar
- Eric Novod - drums

== Discography ==
=== Albums ===
- Searching for a Melody (2003)
- Five to Two (2005)
- Transitions (2006)
- Come and Get It (2009)
- Dedication (2022)

=== Compilation appearances ===
- Give 'Em the Boot IV (2004)
- Give 'Em the Boot V (2006)
- Give 'Em the Boot VI (2007)
- Ska Is Dead (2007)
