= Pressure Cooker (band) =

US musical group

- Origin: Boston, Massachusetts, United States
- Genres: Ska, rocksteady, reggae
- Years active: 1997–present
- Labels: Jump Up
- Members: Craig Akira Fujita - lead vocals Michael O'Connor - tenor saxophone Brian Thomas - trombone Jeffrey Eckman - drums Dan Hawkins - upright bass Adam Dobkowski - guitar Zack Brines - keyboards and organ Robin Teague - tenor saxophone Louisa Bram - trumpet
- Past members: Glen Pine - trombone Lana Cohen - tenor saxophone Jill Considine - trumpet Howie Boswell - backing vocals

Pressure Cooker is a nine-piece reggae/ska/rocksteady band from Boston. The group writes, records, and performs original songs in the styles of 1960s and 1970s Jamaican music. The group formed in 1997.

Pressure Cooker has released seven full-length CDs. Fronted by lead singer Craig Akira Fujita and backed by a core of Boston-area musicians, the band has played to audiences at clubs and festivals spanning from New England to Chicago. Over the years, Pressure Cooker has opened locally for notable artists of roots reggae music including Toots & the Maytals, Burning Spear, Gregory Isaacs, The Wailers, Prince Buster, Derrick Morgan, The Skatalites, Culture, Laurel Aitken, Eek-A-Mouse, Julian Marley, and Sister Carol.

Their most recent full-length album recording, Wherever You Go, was released in December 2012 and funded through Kickstarter.

== Line up ==
- Craig Akira Fujita - vocals
- Michael O'Connor - tenor saxophone
- Brian Thomas - trombone
- Jeffrey Eckman - drums
- Dan Hawkins - bass
- Adam Dobkowski - guitar
- Zack Brines - keyboards
- Robin Teague - tenor saxophone
- Louisa Bram - trumpet

== Discography ==
- Pressure Cooker S/T - 1999
- I Want to Tell You - 2001
- Committed - 2003
- Burning Fence - 2004
- Future's History - 2006
- What She Wants - 2009
- Wherever You Go - 2012
