= My Degeneration =

Studio album by Flashlight Brown
- Released: April 8, 2003
- Recorded: Record One (Los Angeles); Royaltone Studios
- Genres: Pop-punk; post-punk; punk rock
- Length: 29:31
- Label: Hollywood
- Producer: Rob Cavallo

Flashlight Brown chronology
All That Glitters is Mold (2002)	My Degeneration (2003)	Blue (2006)

My Degeneration is the fourth studio album by the punk rock band Flashlight Brown, released on April 8, 2003, via Hollywood Records, as the band's major label debut. This album is their first and only collaboration with producer Rob Cavallo, with the album described as "a culmination of a 6 year career of living on the edge between a dream and despair."

== Background ==
Flashlight Brown formed in 1996 out of boredom and frustration towards their college town of Guelph, and released three studio albums: :flashlight. (1997), Running Season (1999), and Flashlight Brown (2001). Their sophomore album, Running Season, caught the attention of MuchMusic, who interviewed the band throughout that year and the following year, and aired the music video for their song "Sonia Bianchi" in rotation. In 2000, the band released their first MP3 only release on their website titled A Freak, which was downloaded over 5000 times.

Midway through a summer 2002 tour, the band was contacted by producer Rob Cavallo (Green Day, Alanis Morissette, Goo Goo Dolls), a man who was admired by the band. The band were flat broke and sleeping in a parking lot when a date was confirmed for them to fly out to Los Angeles. After originally intending to record two songs with the band, Cavallo quickly fell in love with the band and their music, and decided to produce the full album and sign the band to Hollywood Records.

The opening track, "Ready To Roll", received playtime on MuchOnDemand and Edge 102, was featured in a hockey ad for Sportsnet, and found its way onto the Rugrats Go Wild soundtrack.

== Release and reception ==
Professional ratings
Review scores
Source	Rating
AllMusic	2.5/5 stars
Punknews	3.5/5 stars
IGN	6.5/10

The album dropped on April 8, 2003. It peaked at #60 on the Canadian alternative charts.

The album received mixed to positive reviews. In a staff review, Punknews' Adam White said "My Degeneration has its flaws but manages to very respectably re-establish Flashlight Brown as a good pop-punk act that hasn't compromised making good, fun rock music in the name of marketability." AllMusic's Jonathan Widran said "It's fun, loud, total party music that will appeal to former nerds who make good with cool music -- and those who just enjoy well produced guitar-driven post-punk." IGN's Nick Madsen said "A hilarious, punk rock romp through everyday life from the perspective of four regular guys with a penchant for humorous detail and undeniable truth, My Degeneration is a great album that's held back a little by a few lame tracks and an all too consistent sound."

== Track listing ==
Adapted from Spotify.

All lyrics are written by Flashlight Brown.

My Degeneration
No.	Title	Lead vocals	Length
1.	"Ready To Roll"	Hughes/Bucchino	2:51
2.	"A Freak"	Hughes/Bucchino	2:39
3.	"Patricia"	Hughes/Bucchino	2:55
4.	"Go And Die"	Hughes	2:44
5.	"Whoa Man"	Hughes/Bucchino	2:59
6.	"Lose The Shades"	Hughes/Bucchino	1:36
7.	"Today"	Bucchino/Hughes	3:09
8.	"Praise The Day"	Hughes	2:49
9.	"I'll Only Make You Cry"	Hughes	1:57
10.	"Looking Away"	Hughes	3:19
11.	"Butterball"	Hughes	2:29
Total length:			29:31

My Degeneration Japan bonus tracks
No.	Title	Lead vocals	Length
12.	"New Old New"	Bucchino/Hughes	2:56
13.	"What Deaner Was Talkin' About (Ween cover)"	Hughes	1:35
Total length:			34:02

== Personnel ==
Flashlight Brown

- Matt Hughes – vocals, rhythm guitar
- Fil Bucchino – bass guitar, vocals, piano
- Mike Conroy – lead guitar
- Tim Thomson – drums

Production

- Rob Cavallo – producer
- Chris Lord-Alge – mixing
- Robert Vosgien – mastering
- Greg Goldman – engineer
- Doug McKean, Dan Chase, Dan Burns – Protools engineering
- Cheryl Jenets – production coordinator
- Garner Knutson – drum tech
- Josh Ketchmark – guitar tech
- Andy Rosenthal – design
