= The Sainte Catherines =

Canadian punk rock band

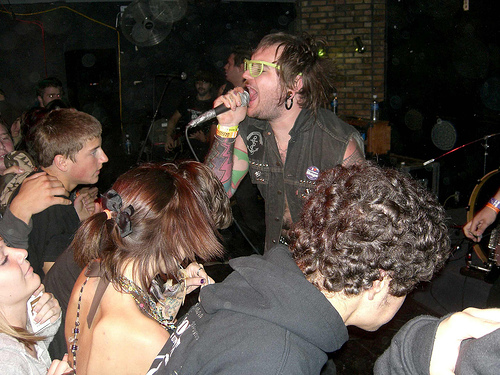

Background information
- Origin: Montreal, Canada
- Genre: Hardcore punk
- Years active: 1999–2012
- Labels: Dare to Care, Fat Wreck Chords, New Romance for Kids
- Members: Hugo Mudie; Fred Jacques; Louis Valiquette; Marc-André Beaudet; Pablo Boerr; Rich

The Sainte Catherines were a Canadian six-piece punk-rock band who formed in Montreal in 1999. The group's name comes from Rue Sainte-Catherine, one of Montreal's main streets. Their third record, The Art of Arrogance was released on local label Dare to Care Records in 2003 and on the German label Yo-Yo Records. In 2006, the band released its fourth LP, titled Dancing for Decadence. The album was released in the United States by Fat Wreck Chords. The Sainte Catherines are the first band from Quebec to be signed to Fat Wreck. In August 2006, The Sainte Catherines played their 500th show. They also released split 7-inch records with Fifth Hour Hero and Whiskey Sunday. In 2008, The Sainte Catherines won a GAMIQ Award for punk album of the year.

They disbanded in April 2012 after their farewell tour with The Hunters. The latter are managed by Hugo Mudie and their second album was produced by him and Marc-André Beaudet. The last show took place at Club Soda in Montréal on April 27.

Several members of the band also play in a side-project, country-folk band; Yesterday's Ring. Yesterday's Ring doesn't have any plans for the future. Their last shows were in September 2010.

Hugo Mudie and Fred Jacques have played shows as a duet since June 2011. Their first release "Miracles" was due in 2012.

Hugo Mudie is the founder of Pouzza Fest, a punk rock festival that takes place in downtown Montreal every year.

Over the years, the band shared the stage with many established acts such as Subhumans, Leatherface, NOFX, as well as peers Fifth Hour Hero, Inepsy, and many more.

They released Fire Works on Anchorless records (USA), Union Label Group (Canada) and Guerilla Asso (France) on October 26, 2010.

== Members ==
- Hugo Mudie – vocals
- Fred Jacques – guitar
- Louis Valiquette – guitar
- Marc-André Beaudet – guitar
- Pablo Boerr – Bass
- Rich Bouthilier – Drums

== Discography ==
- 1999: Those Stars Are For You (Yoyo Records)
- 2002: The Machine Gets Under Way (Eyeball Records)
- 2003: The Art of Arrogance (Dare To Care)
- 2006: Dancing for Decadence (Fat Wreck Chords)
- 2007: The Soda Machine (cd+DVD) (Indica Records)
- 2009: "Pourrito" (split 7-inch) (New Romance for Kids)
- 2010: Fire Works (Anchorless Records/Union)
