= The Know How =

The Know How is a third wave ska band from Gainesville, Florida, formed in 1998. Their musical style blends ska and pop punk and prominently features a Moog synthesizer, alongside more typical ska instrumentation (including an organ and usually one or more trombones).

Despite releases on Jump Up! Records and Stomp Records, numerous nationwide tours (including appearances on the 2005 Warped Tour as well as the second and third Ska Is Dead tours), the band took a long hiatus after their final shows in Gainesville on February 16 and 17, 2007. The band cited financial strains, tour fatigue and fluctuations in the supporting lineup as contributing factors.

The Know How held a reunion show on July 3, 2010 in Gainesville, Florida at the 1982 Bar and played to a sold-out audience.

The Know How reunited in 2021, releasing a four-track self titled EP.

== Current roster ==
- Skyler Stone (vocals- died in 2025)
- Jeremy "Finch" Kestenbaum (guitar)
- Joe Dobrowolski (trombone)
- Evan Cantwell (trumpet)
- Brian Skeen (bass guitar)
- Nick Galluch (synth/organ)
- Bryan Wilson (drums)

== Other members ==
- Dave Lackey (trombone)
- Kyle Nelson (drums)
- Jeff Rosenstock (saxophone)
- David Gardner (trombone)
- Alex Lee (synth/organ)
- Matthew Flenner (saxophone)
- Mike Gallers (saxophone)
- David Krasky (guitar)
- Justin 'Buppy' Rowe (bass)
- Mike Cochran (trombone)
- Lee Hsu (trumpet)
- Stuart Parnes (bass)
- Sean Kane (guitar)
- Alan Mills (trombone)
- Phil Culpepper (trombone)
- Hector "Tito" Sanchez (trombone)
- Frank MacBride (trumpet)
- Sean McInerney (bass)

== Discography ==
- This Won't Hurt A Bit (2000, self-released)
- Happy Fun Robot Kill Time (2002, Jump Up! Records)
- Now In Technicolor (2005, Stomp Records)
- The Know How (2021)
