= Chris Murray (musician) =

Canadian singer-songwriter and guitarist

- Born: September 26, 1966 (age 60)
- Origin: Toronto, Ontario, Canada
- Genres: Ska, Acoustic, Rock
- Occupations: Musician, singer, producer
- Years active: 1989–present
- Labels: Raw Energy; Moon Records; Asian Man; Rebel Alliance
- Website: chrismurray.net

Chris Murray (born September 26, 1966) is a Canadian singer-songwriter and guitarist working primarily in the genre of ska. In Canada, he was the lead singer and primary songwriter of the now-defunct ska band King Apparatus during the late 1980s and early 1990s. He now lives in the Los Angeles, California area, where he performs regularly, both solo as well as with the Chris Murray Combo. He is known for the informal atmosphere of his live shows, during which his set list is determined almost exclusively by live requests from audience members.

== Biography ==
In a departure from the high energy music of King Apparatus, Murray’s initial solo albums on Moon Records and Asian Man Records including the 4-Track Adventures of Venice Shoreline Chris, 4-Trackaganza!, and Raw went in a different direction. Accompanying himself with acoustic guitar, minimal accompaniment, and recorded with a four-track tape recorder, they have a distinctly low fidelity sound. Raw is especially lo-fi, as it was recorded on a hand-held walkman.

Murray has performed throughout North America, Europe, Japan, Korea, and South America, sharing the stage with acts including The Specials, Laurel Aitken, and Skavoovie and the Epitones. He has also contributed to albums for The Planet Smashers as a producer.

A collaboration with the seminal New York City ska band The Slackers resulted in the album Slackness (2005). Described as "the heart and soul of ska" offering up a "smorgasbord of ska reggae and roots," the 12-song album features Murray singing lead vocals on new arrangements of his solo material, as well as some entirely new songs, and a cover of The Clash's "Janie Jones".

Murray founded an acoustic trio, The Chris Murray Combo, to explore the roots of ska. As not many venues were seeking this out, he presented it as "Bluebeat Lounge" Nights, and was eventually offered a residency at the Knitting Factory. The series began the first week of 2003 and was initially suggested to last two or three months. However, it became "an institution and the home of the LA ska scene. We’ve hosted bands from all over the world: Japan, England, Ireland, Jamaica, Canada, Mexico, Russia, Australia, Africa, and almost every corner of the US." The show continued for 7 years until the venue's closure in 2009.

The Chris Murray Combo's Why So Rude (2008) captures Murray as a three piece with Ben Farrar on percussion/backing vocals, and Eddie "Chiquis" Lozoya on bass/backing vocals. The album features newly recorded versions from the Chris Murray and King Apparatus back catalog, along with some new songs. It garnered praise for its "genuine soul, compelling song writing, sincere vocals and subtle harmonies."

In late 2009, it was announced that Chris Murray had signed to Sonic Boom Six's Rebel Alliance record label for the UK. This led to the 2010 release of the album Chris Murray and Friends, a collaborative project blending his signature soulful acoustic, ska, and rocksteady style with an ensemble of guest musicians.

== Discography ==
With King Apparatus

- Loud Party (1989)
- King Apparatus (1990)
- Hospital Waiting Room (1992)
- Marbles (1993)

With the Slackers

- Slackness (2005)

Chris Murray Combo

- Why So Rude (2008)

Solo

- 4-Track Adventures of Venice Shoreline Chris (1996)
- 4-Trackaganza! (2001)
- Raw (2002)
- One Everything (2004)
- Yard Sale (2009)
- Chris Murray – Chris Murray and Friends (2010)
