= The Planet Smashers (album) =

Studio album by The Planet Smashers
- Released: 1995
- Genre: Ska
- Length: 47:33

The Planet Smashers chronology
Meet The Planet Smashers (1994)	The Planet Smashers (1995)	Inflate to 45 RPM (1995)

The Planet Smashers is a 1995 self-titled album by The Planet Smashers. It is described in Man vs Ape as 'a perfect definition of third wave punk ska'. AllMusic writer Curtis Zimmermann was less complimentary about the album, saying 'they play about three chords' and their 'mindless frat-boy lyrics' make other ska bands 'look like English professors.'

== Track listing ==
1. "Mission Aborted" - 2:38
2. "So Happy" - 3:25
3. "Pierce Me" - 3:31
4. "Pee in the Elevator" - 4:11
5. "Janice" - 2:04
6. "2 Souvlaki Pita, 1 Fry" - 2:37
7. "Coolest Guy in the Whole World" - 3:09
8. "Meal of Meat" - 3:51
9. "Shithead" - 0:40
10. "Frozen" - 2:57
11. "My Love (Vampire)" - 3:24
12. "The Manta Ray Dance" - 3:34
13. "Skah of Iran" - 1:39
14. "Gotta Get Away" - 5:59
15. "La Cachée" - 3:53
