= The Planet Smashers =

Canadian musical group

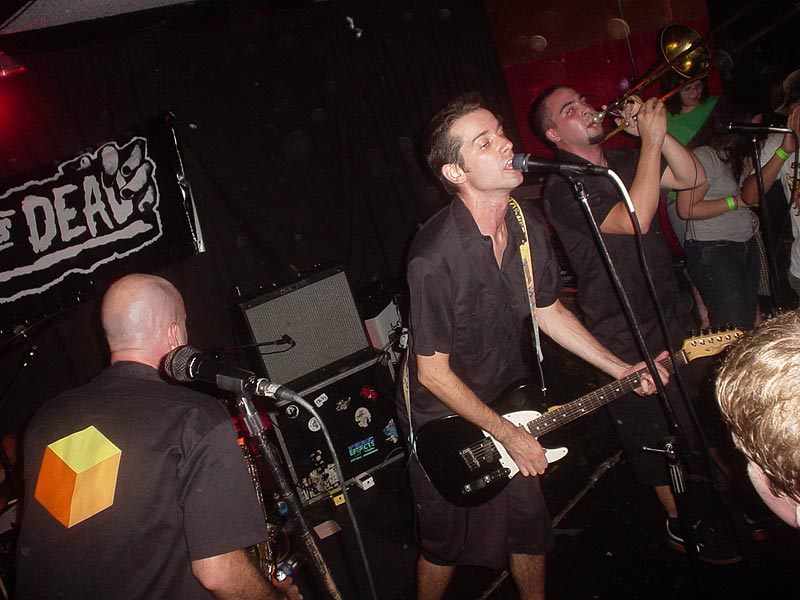
- The Planet Smashers in concert

Background information
- Origin: Montreal, Quebec, Canada
- Genre: Ska punk
- Years active: 1993–present
- Label: Stomp Records
- Members: Matt Collyer; Scott Russell; Andy McAdam; Alexandre Fecteau; Patrick Taylor; Patrizio McLelland
- Past members: Dave Cooper; Fred Brenton; Leon Kingstone; Tim Doyle; Kurt Ruchinsky; Ceco Munaretto; Travis Wilkinson; Andrew Skowronski; Andrew Lattoni; J.O. Bégin; Neil "Lonestar" Johnson; Morgan Moore
- Website: planetsmashers.ca

The Planet Smashers are a Canadian ska punk band from Montreal. Since their formation in 1993, they have been a staple of the Montreal music scene. During the third wave of ska, they performed nationally and later internationally, with tours in the United States, Europe, and Japan. Founding member Matt Collyer helped establish Stomp Records in 1994, which featured many ska and ska punk bands, including Montreal's The Kingpins, The Flatliners, The Know How, and Bedouin Soundclash. Their music has been used in the Japanese flash series Catman, Canadian show Radio Free Roscoe, and MTV's Undergrads (shown on Teletoon in Canada). Lyrics by The Planet Smashers often deal with topics such as love, partying and good times, and sometimes use tongue-in-cheek innuendo.

== History ==
=== Early years (1992–1993) ===
The name "The Planet Smashers" was first used in 1992 for a band including Matt Collyer, Ceco Munaretto, Andrew Conway, and Dave Jones. The original group played punk, ska, and rock inspired by the "Manchester sound." The group primarily focused on live shows although it did record one demo ("The Road Song") at a Montreal studio, and one live performance (Station 10 in Montreal, October 1992). The songs "Coolest Guy" and "Vampire," among others, come from this period. The group briefly disbanded in 1993 - largely because its drummer had vanished.

=== First lineup (1993–1996) ===
The band was reformed in late 1993 by original members, Collyer and Munaretto. The two decided to introduce horns into the band and focus on ska. Travis Wilkinson (Trombone) was attracted to the band by a misleading poster that read "It's your big break, goofball trombone player needed for ska band that's huge in Belgium with confirmed European tour." The other original members were Dave Cooper (drums) and Andrew Skowronski (tenor saxophone). They practiced in the McGill University music department until they were kicked out and their first gig was at the now defunct "Station 10" on March 17, 1994.

The band played small Montreal venues, including "Purple Haze" and the Jailhouse and at ska festivals. All the band members contributed original material and sets included some ska/punk cover tunes. A first demo of three songs was recorded in Cooper's apartment but not released. Later the band recorded their first cassette in a weekend session, using studio time won by one of Collyer's defunct former bands "The Thrill Killers". The quality of this recording was not very high, but it helped get the band more gigs and visibility, including shows outside of Montreal. Popular destinations for the band included the Toucan in Kingston, The Pit in Ottawa, and Sneaky Dees in Toronto. The band was an important part of the vibrant local ska scene that existed in Montreal in the mid-1990s.

The self-titled CD was recorded in spring 1995; because of a tight budget it was produced and recorded by the band in Dave's apartment on a 12 track tape recorder. This album includes favorites like "Pee in the Elevator" and "Janice". The band had its first cross-country tour promoting its release in the summer of 1995.

In 1996 the band's summer tour extended into the United States. The band suffered mishaps like a broken saxophone, multiple van breakdowns, and an issue at the border that prevented Travis from completing the tour. After a few more shows in Montreal the original lineup broke up, with Ceco, Andrew and Travis leaving the band.

=== 1997–present ===
The Planet Smashers have continued, with Collyer and Cooper remaining as core members and a series of new members and sidemen. Cooper switched from drums to bass guitar when Tim Doyle joined the band. For the past decade or so, the band's lineup has primarily consisted of Matt Collyer, Dave Cooper, Scott Russell, Alexandre Fecteau, Patrick Taylor, and most recently, keyboardist Patrizio McLelland was added to the band.

The Planet Smashers released Descent Into the Valley of the Planet Smashers on July 12, 2011.

Their eighth studio album, titled Mixed Messages, was released April 8, 2014, via Stomp Records. They released a video for the single "Tear It Up" featuring the members of the Montreal Roller Derby league.

In 2016, The band took a small hiatus after Matt broke his neck. After a successful surgery by Dr. Carlo Santaguida, his paralysis in his strumming arm returned and he was able to fully return to touring.

In 2019, their ninth studio album, Too Much Information, was released. This is the first album to feature keyboardist Patrizio McLelland and second album to feature trombonist Patrick Taylor. The band continues to tour Canada and plays sporadic dates in the United States with Andy McAdam filling in on bass for Dave Cooper. Eventually, Andy McAdam replaced long-time member Dave Cooper as the band's bassist.

== Current members ==
- Matt Collyer (guitar, lead vocals)
- Patrick Taylor (trombone, backing vocals)
- Alexandre Fecteau (tenor saxophone, backing vocals)
- Scott Russell (drums)
- Patrizio McLelland (organ, backing vocals)
- Andy McAdam (bass guitar, backing vocals)

== Discography ==
Year	Title
1994	Meet The Planet Smashers
1995	The Planet Smashers
1995	Inflate to 45 RPM (vinyl - limited release)
1997	Attack of The Planet Smashers
1999	Life of the Party
1999	Smash Hits (compilation)
2001	No Self Control
2002	Fabricated (compilation)
2003	Mighty
2004	TEN (DVD)
2005	Unstoppable
2011	Descent Into the Valley of The Planet Smashers
2014	Mixed Messages
2019	Too Much Information
2025	On The Dancefloor

== Videography ==
- Mission Aborted (1995)
- My Decision (1997)
- Change (1998)
- Too Much Attitude (1999)
- Super Orgy Porno Party (1999)
- Surfing In Tofino (1999)
- Hey Hey (2001)
- Fabricated (2001)
- Wish I Were American (2001)
- Blind (2001)
- Explosive (2003)
- J'aime Ta Femme (I Like Your Girl) (2003)
- Raise Your Glass (2005)
- Bullets to the Ground (2005)
- Descent Into the Valley of the Planet Smashers (2011)
- Hippopotamus (2011)
- Tear It Up (2014)
- Can’t Stop (2019)
- Too Much Information (2019)
- Break Your Neck (A Love Song) (2019)
- Meet Me On The Dancefloor (2025)
- Things You Do (2025)
- Wasted Tomorrows (2025)
- Alien (2026)
