= The Resignators =

Australian ska punk rock band

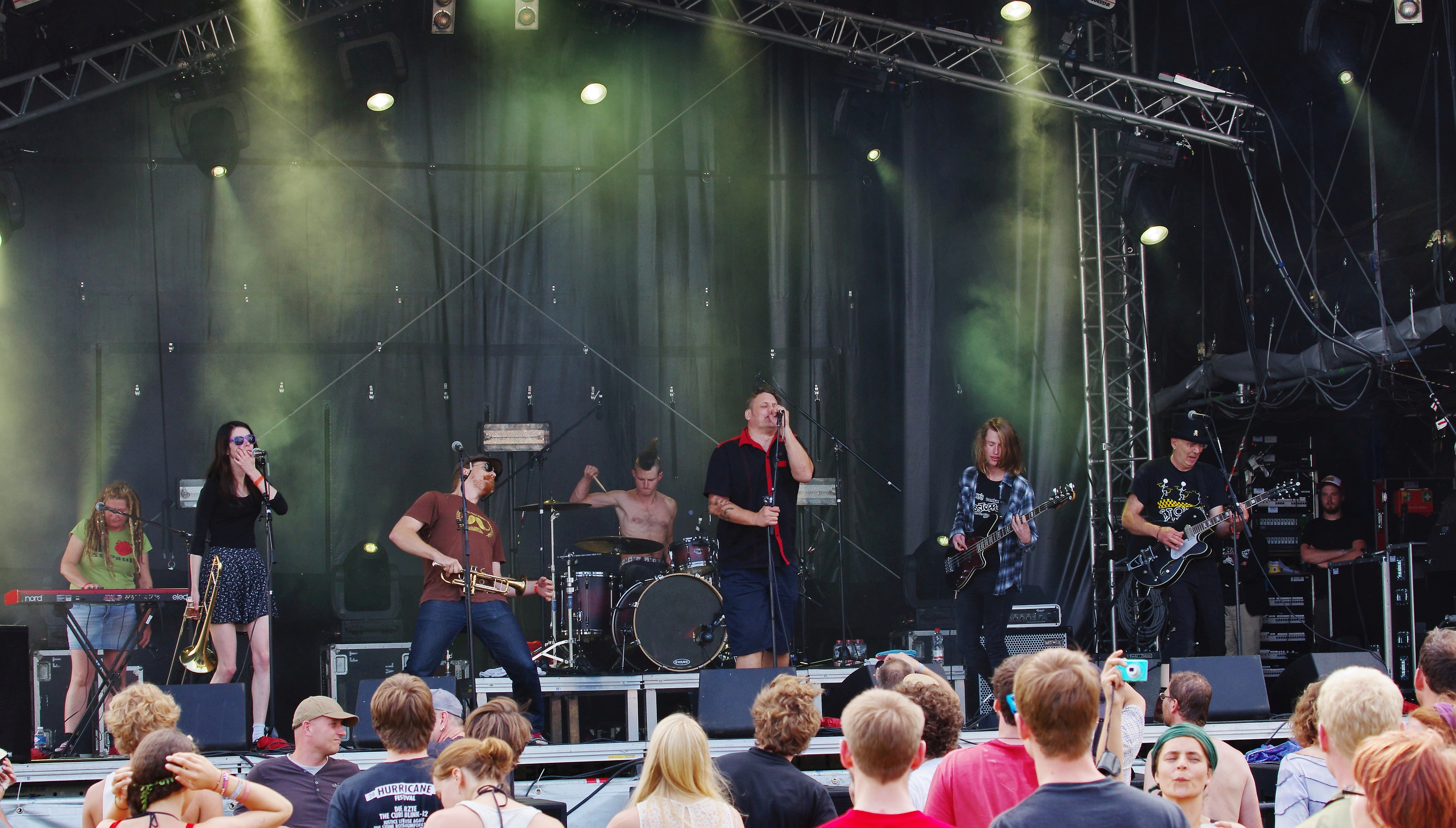
- The Resignators performing in 2013

Background information
- Origin: Melbourne, Victoria, Australia
- Genre: Ska punk
- Years active: 2005–present
- Labels: Care Factor Records, Stomp Records (Canada), Rocking Records (Germany), Dammit Records (UK)
- Members: Francis Harrison, Steve Douglas, Stacy Kilpatrick, Jeremy Meaden, Dan Bendrups, Simon Wilson, Chris Kwan
- Past members: Christopher Salaoras, Benji Miu, Ellen Morabit, Jono James,Leda Scott, Holly Knowles, Dermot O'Brien, Aidan Purdy, Tom Dittman, Darren Milligan, Ted Kazan, Morgan Kaye, Nathan Hennequin, John Howell, Ben Koulloutas, Bruce Armstrong, Nick Thorpe, Jeremy Wallace, Michael Lucas, Jason Xanthoulakis, Ben Sharp, Nick Ross, Cinta Masters, Charley Phypers, Rael Gamble, Kane Skinner
- Website: www.theresignators.com

The Resignators are an Australian ska punk rock band formed in Melbourne, Victoria, in 2005. Known for combining ska, punk rock, and reggae styles of music.

== History ==
The Resignators were formed in 2005, by Francis Harrison and Ellen Morabito. The group began performing at local venues and festivals, gradually developing a following through energetic live shows and independent releases. Throughout their career, the band toured nationally and internationally, including performances in Europe and North America.

== Musical style ==
The band's sound incorporates elements of ska, punk, rock, and reggae, characterized by horn sections, upstroke guitar rhythms, and high-tempo arrangements. Critics have noted their style as reminiscent of both traditional ska and modern punk revival movements.

== Discography ==
=== Albums ===
- Time Decays (2007)
- Offbeat Time (2009)
- See You in Hell (2010–2012)
- Down in Flames (2013)
- Party Dates (2017)
- Rabbithole (2023)
- Rabbithole (2024)
- Sugar Kicks and Tributes (2025)

=== EPs and singles ===
- Offbeat Feeling (2006)
- You Got Me Thinking (2006)
- How You Could Rage (2010)
- Fish Outta Water (2015)
- Bluebird Tattoo (2020)
- Talisman (2021)
- Messenger (2021)
- Loin Groin / The Resignators – Split (2022)
- Sugar High (2025)

== Current members ==
- Francis Harrison – lead vocals
- Steve Douglas – guitar, vocals, producer
- Stacy Kilpatrick – keyboards, tenor sax, vocals
- Jeremy Meaden – trumpet, vocals
- Dan Bendrups – trombone, vocals
- Simon Wilson – bass, vocals
- Chris Kwan – drums
