= Union Label Group =

Record label based in Montreal, Canada

- Founded: 1994
- Founder: Matt Collyer and Jordan Swift
- Genre: Ska punk, Surf punk, Punk, Rock, Psychobilly, Hardcore
- Country of origin: Canada
- Location: Montreal, Quebec
- Official website: www.unionlabelgroup.com

Union Label Group is a record label based in Montreal, Quebec, Canada. It was formed through the merger of the smaller labels Stomp Records, 2112 Records, and Tyrant Records. Mayday! Records was later created as a genre imprint.

Stomp Records was founded in 1994 by Matt Collyer of The Planet Smashers and Jordan Swift of The Kingpins. The label specializes in third wave ska, and was founded to release All-Skanadian Club Volume 1, a compilation of ska and ska punk from across Canada. Soon after that release, The Planet Smashers released their self-titled debut album and The Kingpins released the "On the Run" EP on the label. In 2000, Stomp Records merged with 2112 Records, a Montreal label that specialized in punk rock, to form Union 2112. Tyrant Records released mod revival, garage rock, and new wave music. This imprint has been discontinued. Mayday! Records are dedicated to Canadian street punk.

== Artists ==
=== Stomp Records ===
- The Anti-Queens
- Bad Waitress
- The BCASA
- Bedouin Soundclash
- Big D and the Kids Table
- Bike Thiefs
- The Black Halos
- Boids
- The Brains
- Brutal Youth
- Buck-O-Nine
- Capable!
- Crash Ton Rock
- The Creepshow
- Cross Dog
- Doghouse Rose
- The Dreadnoughts
- Duotang
- The Expos
- Fake Friends
- The Flatliners
- The Filthy Radicals
- Gangster Politics
- General Chaos
- The Hunters
- Isotopes Punk Rock Baseball Club
- Jah Cutta
- JFK & the Conspirators
- The Johnstones
- Joystick
- K-Man & The 45's
- King Apparatus
- The Kingpins
- The Know How
- Los Kung Fu Monkeys
- The New City Gamblers
- New York Ska-Jazz Ensemble
- One Night Band
- Paul Cargnello
- Penske Files
- Pkew Pkew Pkew
- Raygun Cowboys
- The Peacocks
- The Planet Smashers
- The Real McKenzies
- The Real Sickies
- The Resignators
- The Saint Alvia Cartel
- Sarah Blackwood
- Skavenjah
- The Stomp All Stars
- Subb
- Taxi Girls
- The Toasters
- The Undercovers
- Voodoo Glow Skulls
- Westbound Train
- Whole Lotta Milka
- Wine Lips

=== Union 2112 ===
- Ann Beretta
- Belvedere
- Captain Everything!
- Ceremonial Snips
- Death by Stereo
- Down By Law
- Eric Panic
- Fifty Nutz
- Flashlight Brown
- The Frenetics
- Men O' Steel
- Misconduct
- My Big Wheel
- Nicotine
- Penelope
- The Real Deal
- Rentokill
- Reset
- The Resistance
- The Riptides
- Snitch
- Snuff
- X Large

=== Mayday Records ===
- Ripcordz

== See also ==
- List of record labels
