= Kill Kill Kill =

EP by Anti-Flag
- Released: 1995
- Recorded: 1995
- Genre: Punk rock
- Label: Self-Served/Ripe Records

Anti-Flag chronology
Rock'n with Father Mike (1993)	Kill Kill Kill (1995)	Die for the Government (1996)

Kill Kill Kill is the debut 7-inch EP by Anti-Flag. They had released a couple of splits before this and had appeared on a compilation or two, but this was their first solo release. It was recorded and released "around 1995". Most of the songs can be found on their first full-length Die for the Government.

== Track listing ==
1. "You'd Do the Same"
2. "No More Dead"
3. "Kill the Rich"
4. "Davey Destroyed the Punk Scene"

Notes: The versions of "You'd Do the Same", "No More Dead", and "Kill the Rich" are exactly the same recordings used on Die for the Government, but the version of "Davey Destroyed the Punk Scene" is exclusive to this release.

== Personnel ==
- Justin Sane – vocals, guitar
- Pat Thetic – drums
- Andy Flag – bass, vocals
