= Rump Shaker (album) =

Studio album by Suburban Legends
- Released: June 28, 2003
- Genres: Ska punk, pop punk
- Length: 42:30
- Label: Lobster Girl
- Producer: John Avila

Suburban Legends chronology
| Suburban Legends (Tim Remix) (2002) | Rump Shaker (2003) | Dance Like Nobody's Watching (2006) |

Professional ratings
Review scores
| Source | Rating |
|---|---|
| AbsolutePunk | 91% |
| PunkNews.org | 4.5/5 stars |

Rump Shaker is the second album of the third-wave ska band Suburban Legends. It was released June 28, 2003, in Los Angeles, California by Lobster Girl Records. The album initially sold 15,000 copies and was subsequently released on Brand New Hero Records in the UK.

It was produced by John Avila, former bassist of Oingo Boingo, one of the band's major influences. In 2005, when the band was featured as ManiaTV!'s Artist of the Day, Tim Maurer joked of the experience, "We went to [Avila's] house. We strapped him down to a bed. We played our music in the CD player 20,000 times. We fed him only a diet of oatmeal and gruel. He agreed then to produce our album. And we paid him and we thanked him and it was fun. And it was good. And it was fun."

On January 1, 2011, the Western Carolina University Pride of the Mountains Marching Band performed the song "You" live on national television in the 2011 Tournament of Roses Parade.

Asbestos Records and Underground Communiqué Records set up and successfully crowdfunded a Kickstarter project in 2011, which allowed a re-release of Rump Shaker on vinyl in 2012 alongside The Pietasters' Oolooloo, Edna's Goldfish's Before You Knew Better, and Pilfers' self-titled album.

== Track listing ==
1. "High Fives" – 4:24
2. "You" – 3:59
3. "Bright Spring Morning" – 4:04
4. "Up All Night" – 4:13
5. "Blingity Bling" – 2:36
6. "Autumn in the Park" – 3:56
7. "Powerful Game" – 3:29
8. "Zanzibar" – 3:58
9. "All the Nights" – 2:53
10. "Do it for the Kids" – 3:52
11. "Last Dance" – 5:04

== Music videos ==
Promotional music videos were released for "High Fives" and "Up All Night". The video for "High Fives" was a compilation of clips of the band performing at the Disneyland Resort and visiting a fair. The music video for "Up All Night" features an animated version of the band, based on Nic Cowan's Rump Shaker album artwork, performing in the streets of Tokyo, which subsequently comes under attack from a giant lizard called Skazilla.

== Personnel ==
Regular members

- Tim Maurer – lead vocals
- Vince Walker – trumpet, vocals on "Blingity Bling" and "Powerful Game", backing vocals
- Aaron Bertram – trumpet, vocals on "Powerful Game", backing vocals
- Brian Robertson – trombone, backing vocals
- Dallas Cook – trombone
- Brian Klemm – lead guitar, vocals on "Powerful Game", backing vocals
- Chris Maurer – bass guitar, backing vocals
- Derek Lee Rock – drums

Guest musicians

- Tubazar – tuba ("Autumn in the Park" & "Zanzibar")
- Yoko Nishiguchi, Brent Toda, Walter Tsushima & Evan Webb – from Nishikaze Taiko ("Bright Spring Morning & "Zanzibar")
