= Don't Cut Your Fabric to This Year's Fashion =

Studio album by Action Action
- Released: September 14, 2004
- Recorded: January–March 2004
- Studio: Pie, Glen Clove, New York; General, Long Island, New York
- Genre: Indie rock, punk rock
- Length: 50:19
- Label: Victory
- Producer: William Wittman

Action Action chronology
Don't Cut Your Fabric to This Year's Fashion (2004)	An Army of Shapes Between Wars (2006)

Don't Cut Your Fabric to This Year's Fashion is the debut album by the Long Island band Action Action, released on September 14, 2004, shortly after the band formed.

== Background ==
Action Action formed in early 2004 out of the demise of the Reunion Show, Count the Stars, and Diffuser, with a line-up of frontman Mark Thomas Kluepfel, bassist Clarke Foley, guitarist and keyboardist Adam Manning, and drummer Dan Leo. William Wittman served as the producer and engineer for the band's debut album. Leo recorded his drums on January 15–17, 2004 at Pie Studios in Glen Clove, New York with Dylan. Overdubs were then made in two separate stints, the first between January 19 and February 9, 2004, and the second on March 15, 2004, at General Studios in Long Island, New York with engineer George Fullan of Three Year Later. Additional tracks were taken from Kluepfel's demos, which he recorded on a laptop. Wittman and Fullan mixed the recordings at Allaire Studios in Shokan, New York with assistance from Matt Cullen. Ue Nastasi then mastered the album on April 5, 2004, at Sterling Sound in New York City.

== Composition and lyrics ==
Musically, the sound of Don't Cut Your Fabric to This Year's Fashion has been described as indie rock and punk rock, reminiscent of the work of the Faint, the Killers, and the Rapture. Its title is culled from a Gene Hackman interview on the DVD release of The Royal Tenenbaums (2001). Vocalist Mark Thomas Kluepfel has been compared to the Cure frontman Robert Smith. Wittman did sequencing on "This Year's Fashion", "Photograph", "The Short Weekend Begins with a Longing". Kris Baldwin contributed guitar to "Photograph", "Bleed", and "A Simple Question".

The album's opening track "This Year's Fashion" recalled the work of Depeche Mode and New Order, and is followed by "Drug Like", which sees Kluepfel looking for substance in his life. "Photograph" features keyboards in the vein of the Cars and Def Leppard-styled guitarwork, evoking the sound of Kill Your Television -era (2002) the Reunion Show. "Basic Tiny Fragment" begins with at a slow tempo with Kluepfel's voice against a guitar, eventually building up into screaming from Fullan.

The next two songs, "Bleed", which features Eddie Reyes of Taking Back Sunday on guitar, and "Instructions on Building a Model Airplane", also with screaming from Fullan, continue this structure. "Eighth-Grade Summer Romance" features EBow from Baldwin and a guitar solo from Gary Bennett of Kill Your Idols. The guitar-centric "Broken", with vocals from Doug Robinson of the Sleeping, is followed by the Coldplay-esque ballad "Four Piece Jigsaw Puzzle". "Don't Cut Your Fabric" repeats the same set of lyrics heard in "This Year's Fashion" at a faster pace.

== Release ==
On June 21, 2004, the existence of Action Action was made public. Alongside this, Don't Cut Your Fabric to This Year's Fashion was announced for release in three months' time, with the artwork and "Drug Like" being posted online. Action Action embarked on a tour of record stores throughout the release month. In November 2004, the band went on a US tour with The Beautiful Mistake. They ended the year touring with Bayside; in January and February 2005, the band toured with Lovedrug. They supported Straylight Run and the All-American Rejects on separate headlining US tours between February and April 2005, and appeared at The Bamboozle festival. They supported Midtown on their headlining US tour, and played a few shows in June and July 2005 with labelmates Spitalfield and the Forecast. They went on a headlining tour until August 2005, with Spitalfield and Gatsbys American Dream; Down to Earth Approach appeared on the first half, while Waking Ashland featured on the second half. They appeared at a Victory Records showcase at CMJ Music Marathon in September 2005.

== Reception ==
Professional ratings
Review scores
Source	Rating
AllMusic	3.5/5 stars
High Voltage Magazine	8/11
Orlando Sentinel	3/5 stars
Ox-Fanzine	7/10
The Providence Phoenix	2/5 stars
Punknews.org	3/5 stars

Don't Cut Your Fabric to This Year's Fashion was met with mixed reviews from music critics. AllMusic reviewer Rick Anderson said that if listeners enjoy the work of Echo & the Bunnymen and the Psychedelic Furs, "you'll get a big kick out of this album". He added that the majority of the tracks "stick with you pretty tenaciously, though, and this is a very promising debut overall". Manuel Possible of Ox-Fanzine said the indie rock songs were "broken up again and again with punk rock numbers that are a bit too cheesy". Though it was "missing the common thread somewhere, it turned out to be a nice and multi-faceted album". The staff at Impact Press was initially sceptical to its synthesizer-based sound during the first track, but for the remainder, saw it as "accessible pop-rock songs with emotional vocals". High Voltage Magazine's Jennifer E. enjoyed the first two tracks but did not like Kluepfel's yelling as the album progressed; she mentioned that the band seem to be "trying for too much diversity within the same tune, leaving me enjoying.. hesitating.. forgiving.. finally uncertain".

Punknews.org staff member Brian Shultz wrote that while it was a worthy effort, it suffers from the "confines that recording administers, not to mention dragging in places thanks to its overambitious push (it clocks in around 50 minutes)". Orlando Sentinel writer Jim Abbott said on occasion "all the pieces come together memorably, but occasionally one wonders if it's all worth the effort", calling it "so derivative at points that it sounds more like a tribute band than something genuinely revealing". Ashley Megan of Soundthesirens echoed a similar sentiment, stating that while the "music that results is refreshingly different," the majority of the album was "overwhelmingly bleak and moody with little song variety". The Providence Phoenix's Mikael Wood compared the band to the Killers, stating that Kluepfel was "nowhere near the tunesmith head Killer Brandon Flowers is, but he’s almost as shameless in his wholesale appropriations of cheesy ’80s pop moves". Julie Gerstein for Punk Planet said Kluepfel came across as "so self-obsessed that it's amazing he found three dudes to play with him. Don't Cut isn't the worst thing ever, but it does sound pretty self-involved".

== Track listing ==
All tracks written by Mark Thomas Kluepfel.

No.	Title	Length
1.	"This Year's Fashion"	3:59
2.	"Drug Like"	4:56
3.	"Photograph"	3:34
4.	"Basic Tiny Fragments"	2:46
5.	"Bleed"	4:11
6.	"Instructions on Building a Model Airplane"	2:28
7.	"A Simple Question"	4:10
8.	"Eighth-Grade Summer Romance"	3:23
9.	"Let's Never Go to Sleep"	4:13
10.	"Broken"	4:24
11.	"Four Piece Jigsaw Puzzle"	2:39
12.	"Don't Cut Your Fabric"	3:06
13.	"The Short Weekend Begins with a Longing"	6:30

== Personnel ==
Personnel per sleeve.

Action Action

- Mark Thomas Kluepfel – vocals, synthesizer (all except track 8), guitar (all except tracks 2 and 7), loops (tracks 2, 7 and 13), sequencer (track 3), organs (tracks 4, 7, 12 and 13), mellotron (tracks 5 and 8), Wurlitzer (track 11)
- Skully – drums (all except track 11)
- Clarke Foley – bass (all except tracks 1 and 11), backing vocals (track 3)
- Adam Manning – guitars (tracks 2 and 3)

Additional musicians

- William Wittman – sequencing (tracks 1, 3 and 13), backing vocals (track 12), slide guitar (track 4)
- Kris Baldwin – guitars (tracks 3, 5 and 7), EBow (track 8)
- George Fullan – screams (tracks 4 and 6)
- Eddie Reyes – guitars (track 5)
- Gary Bennett – guitar solo (track 8)
- Doug Robinson – vocals (track 10)

Production and design

- William Wittman – producer, engineer, mixing
- George Fullan – engineer, mixing
- Dylan – assistant engineer
- Matt Cullen – assistant engineer
- Ue Nastasi – mastering
- Doublej – layout
- Mark Thomas Kluepfel – layout
- Mike Duesenberg – cover concept
