= Dance Like Nobody's Watching (EP) =

EP by Suburban Legends

EP by Suburban Legends
- Released: May 12, 2006
- Recorded: January 2006
- Genre: Pop rock; funk
- Length: 22:34
- Producer: Dennis Hill

Suburban Legends chronology
Season One (Suburban Legends album) (2004)	Dance Like Nobody's Watching (2006)	Dance Like Nobody's Watching: Tokyo Nights (2007)

Professional ratings
Review scores
Source	Rating
Absolute Punk	75%

Dance Like Nobody's Watching is a six-track EP released by American ska/pop band Suburban Legends, released on May 12, 2006. The EP signaled a drastic change in the band's sound, which also followed major lineup changes following the departure of lead vocalist Tim Maurer and trumpet player Aaron Bertram, and the untimely death of trombonist Ryan Dallas Cook. The band's previous release, Rump Shaker, was a poppy ska punk release, whereas Dance Like Nobody's Watching largely abandoned the ska influence in favor of a funk/disco-influenced sound, which would feature heavily in their following release, Infectious in 2007, and somewhat on 2008's Let's Be Friends, which featured a few ska tracks. The sudden genre change alienated some of the band's fanbase. This genre change was largely abandoned in favor of the band's original ska-influenced style with the release of Going on Tour in 2010 and Day Job in 2012.

The EP's first five tracks are all-new, funk/disco-influenced pop rock, with a soft, melancholy piano rock version of "Bright Spring Morning," a track from the group's 2003 album, Rump Shaker. This version of the song was first performed at the band's October 28, 2005, performance at iMusicast in Oakland, the first show after trombonist Ryan Dallas Cook's death.

The band performed "Come Back Home" on G4's Attack of the Show! on April 28, 2006, in promotion of the EP.

== Track listing ==
1. "Come Back Home" – 3:46
2. "This Cherry" – 3:55
3. "Hey DJ" – 3:30
4. "Mean Girl" – 3:19
5. "Golden Touch" – 3:31
6. "Bright Spring Morning" – 5:13

== Personnel ==
- Vincent Walker – vocals
- Brian Klemm – lead guitar
- Derek Lee Rock – drums
- Mike Hachey – bass guitar
- Brian Robertson – trombone
- Luis Beza – trumpet
- Phillip Inzerillo – trombone

== Dance Like Nobody's Watching: Tokyo Nights ==
Dance Like Nobody's Watching: Tokyo Nights

Studio album by Suburban Legends
- Released: March 21, 2007
- Recorded: January 2006, January / February 2007
- Genre: Third-wave ska; Funk; rock
- Label: Subrange
- Producer: Dennis Hill; Dallas Kruse

Suburban Legends chronology
Dance Like Nobody's Watching (2006)	Dance Like Nobody's Watching: Tokyo Nights (2007)	Infectious (2007)

Dance Like Nobody's Watching: Tokyo Nights is a full-length Japan-only album released by Suburban Legends, and was released on March 21, 2007. It contains the original EP (with slightly re-ordered track listing), a cover song, two new songs (which later appeared on the band's full-length album Infectious) and songs from the album Rump Shaker, remixed and complete with a new vocal track from Vince Walker, as well as new horn and synthesizer tracks. The album is Japan exclusive but trombone player and webmaster Brian Robertson has hinted the album may be available on iTunes for download in the future.

A cover of Katteni-Shindobatto by Southern All Stars was recorded for the album, but did not make it onto the final release due to publishing issues. It was sung entirely in Japanese by Vince Walker.

=== Track listing ===
1. "This Cherry"
2. "Hey DJ"
3. "Come Back Home"
4. "Mean Girl"
5. "Golden Touch"
6. "Dancing Machine"
7. "You Told Me That"
8. "Bed of Roses"
9. "Up All Night"
10. "Powerful Game"
11. "Bright Spring Morning"

=== Personnel ===
- Vincent Walker – vocals
- Brian Klemm – lead guitar
- Derek Lee Rock – drums
- Mike Hachey – bass guitar
- Brian Robertson – trombone
- Luis Beza – trumpet
- Dallas Kruse – keyboard, keytar
- Phillip Inzerillo – trombone (only on tracks 1–5)
