= Coolie Ranx =

British-American singer (born 1965)

- Born: Obiajula Ugbomah; 9 March 1965 (age 61); London, England
- Genres: Pop, reggae, ska
- Occupations: Actor, singer
- Instrument: Vocals
- Years active: 1990–present
- Labels: Moon Records, Mojo Records, Bravel Records, Lindwood Records

Coolie Ranx (born Obiajula Ugbomah; 9 March 1965) is a British actor and singer best known for his membership in the third wave ska bands the Toasters and Pilfers. He is a long-time resident of New York City.

== Biography ==
Ranx was born in London on 9 March 1965 and was raised in New York City. His mother is from Jamaica and his father is from Nigeria. He was discovered in 1990 when the lead singer and guitarist of the Toasters, Rob "Bucket" Hingley, heard Ranx's dancehall reggae EP. Joining the Toasters in the early 1990s, he toured and recorded two albums with the band, including Dub 56, which features two songs he wrote.

After leaving the Toasters, Ranx co-founded a band called Pilfers. In Pilfers, he shared vocal duties with Vinny Nobile. Pilfers played a combination of third wave ska music, punk rock, and reggae that they called "raggacore". After self-releasing their first album, the band signed to Mojo Records, who released the band's second album, Chawalaleng. He made frequent guest appearances on the albums of other third wave ska bands, such as Spring Heeled Jack, Metro Stylee and Mojo labelmates Reel Big Fish.

After a lineup change, which saw the replacement of the rhythm section, Pilfers disbanded in 2001. Ranx began a solo career, recording and playing shows around the world with Fear Nuttin' Band as his new backup band. In November 2005, he and the other four original members of Pilfers, reunited at the Knitting Factory in New York City for a sold-out performance.

Ranx provided the voice of Little Jacob in the 2008 video game Grand Theft Auto IV.

== Discography ==
- 1990 The Toasters – Frankenska
- 1993 The Toasters – Live in L.A.
- 1994 The Toasters – Dub 56
- 1995 Magadog – Magadog – "Smoke"
- 1996 The Toasters – Hard Band For Dead
- 1996 The Pietasters – Comply – "Tell You Why"
- 1996 Pilfers – Rude by Association (self-released 5 song demo tape)
- 1997 Magadog – Daze... (1992–1997) – "Smoke (Remix)"
- 1998 Metro Stylee – Soul Garage Ska – "Back Again"
- 1998 Eastern Standard Time – Second Hand – "Mad Dog"
- 1998 Spring Heeled Jack – Songs From Suburbia – "Man of Tomorrow"
- 1998 Pilfers – Pilfers
- 1999 Reel Big Fish – Why Do They Rock So Hard? – "Song No.3" & "Thank You for Not Moshing"
- 1999 Pilfers – Chawalaleng
- 1999 Aks Mamma – Jolly Holidays – "Get Together"
- 1999 Nicotine – Carnival – "Bad Breath"
- 2000 The Toasters – The Best Of...
- 2001 Catch 22 – Washed Up And Through The Ringer! – "Straight Forward"
- 2004 "Rankin Don" – It's Time – "More To Me"
- 2006 Sonic Boom Six – The Ruff Guide to Genre Terrorism – "All In"
- 2006 The WBC (Wuda Bang Clan) – Hi-Fidelity Offbeat – "Better Left Unsaid"
- 2007 Babylove and the van Dangos – Big Big Baboon 7" – "Big Big Baboon"
- 2007 More Than Me – 1.0 – "Love You More"
- 2007 "Father Goose Music"- It's a Bam Bam Diddly! – "Bam Bam"
- 2010 Exes Of Evil – Take My Number
- 2010 Across The Aisle In Ska We Trust EP – "Beer Song"
- 2012 Reel Big Fish – Candy Coated Fury – "Hiding in My Headphones"
- 2013 Big D and The Kid's Table – Stroll – "Put It in a Song"
- 2014 Father Goose – Bashment Time – "Constant Sorrow"
- 2015 Doped Up Dollies – The New Way Out – "Be Free"
- 2015 Pilfers "From Far"
- 2016 Pilfers "Zimbabwe" Specialized Project
- 2016 Sonic Boom Six "Train Leaves Tomorrow"
- 2016 Eric Best "Linoleum"
- 2018 "Father Goose Music" – King of the Dance Party (61st Annual GRAMMY Awards Ballot)
- 2019 "Father Goose Music" "Rise Up Now"(61st Annual GRAMMY Awards Ballot)
- 2020 Coolie Ranx for song off his debut music project entitled "Days Gone By" All Dem Ah Try"
- 2022 Coolie Release The Intro to "Days Gone By" announcing his arrival of his Raggacore debut project
- 2023 Coolie Ranx Release and single called Miracle of the "Lovers Rock" genre parts of a full length
