= Good Luck (Big D and the Kids Table album) =

Studio album by Big D and the Kids Table
- Released: 1999
- Genre: Ska punk
- Length: 42:09
- Label: Asian Man

Big D and the Kids Table chronology
| Live EP (1998) | Good Luck (1999) | The Gipsy Hill (2002) |

Professional ratings
Review scores
| Source | Rating |
|---|---|
| Allmusic | 3.5/5 stars |
| Punknews.org | 4/5 stars |

Good Luck is the debut studio album by Big D and the Kids Table.

== Track listing ==
1. "Myself" – 2:33
2. "5 Kids Down" – 2:16
3. "G.L.D." – 2:02
4. "Are You Just Scared?" – 1:46
5. "Fatman" – 3:17
6. "She Won't Ever Figure it Out" – 2:26
7. "Take Another Look" – 2:36
8. "Find Out" – 4:22
9. "Can't Be Caught" – 2:55
10. "I'd Rather" – 2:45
11. "Apology" – 0:51
12. "Dirt Lip" – 2:34
13. "Learning To Listen" – 2:04
14. "51 Gardner" – 5:21
15. "Good Luck" – 4:21
- Track 5 – Fatman is a new version of "Phatmothafucka" on the album Porch Life.

== Credits ==
- Chris Bush — tenor saxophone
- Gabe Feenberg — trombone
- Marc 'The Skipper' Flynn — vocals, trumpet, valve trombone
- Steve Foote — bass
- Jon Lammi — guitar
- Max MacVeety — drums
- David McWane — vocals
- Sean P. Rogan — guitar
- Chris Sallen — tenor saxophone
- Dan Stoppelman — trumpet
