= Rump Shaker =

Rump Shaker may refer to the following:

- Rump Shaker (album), a 2003 ska album by Suburban Legends
- "Rump Shaker" (song), a 1992 rap single by Wreckx-N-Effect (feat. Teddy Riley) from their 1992 album Hard or Smooth
- "Rumpshaker", a single by Chandra Davis
