= Vincent Walker =

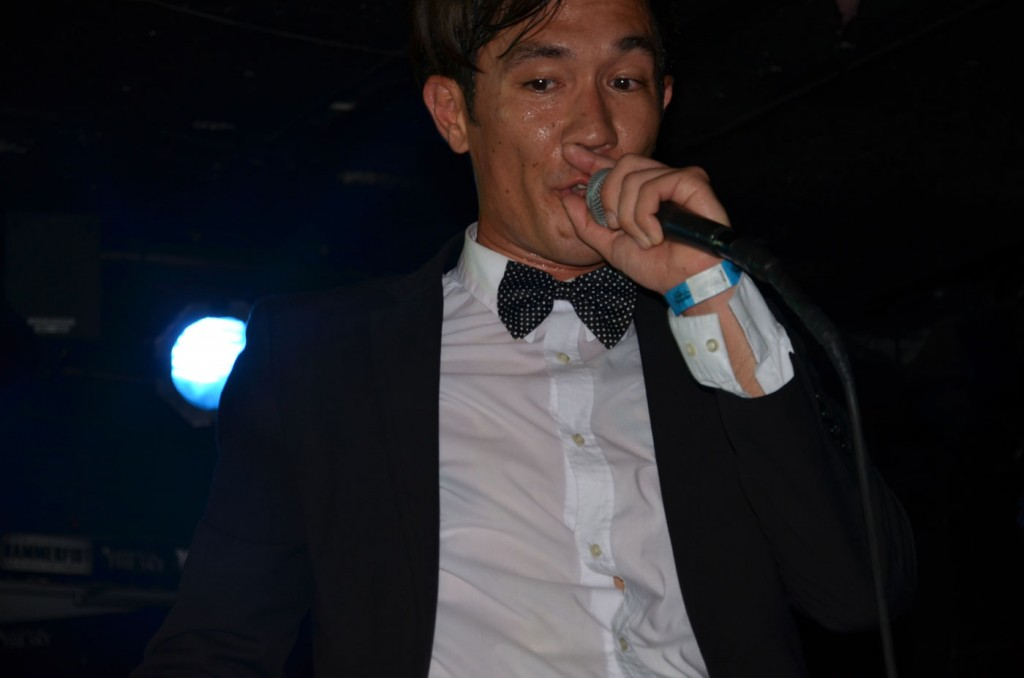

Background information
- Born: Vincent Francis Walker; March 2, 1980 (age 46); Seattle, Washington, United States
- Origin: Orange County, California, United States
- Genres: Third wave ska, funk, disco
- Instruments: Vocals, trumpet, guitar
- Years active: 1998–present
- Member of: Suburban Legends; The Littlest Man Band; Personal Satisfaction

Vincent Francis Walker (born March 2, 1980), better known as Vince Walker, is an American multi-instrumentalist, best known as the lead singer of third-wave ska band Suburban Legends. He was formerly the lead trumpet player and left sometime after the release of Rump Shaker but returned to the band in September 2005 for the band's appearance on the Jerry Lewis MDA Telethon, which happened to be lead singer Tim Maurer's last performance. He replaced Maurer as the singer in an odd switching of roles and continues with the band as frontman.

Walker was born in Seattle, Washington. Although he did not become lead singer of Suburban Legends until 2005, he previously sang on "Brian and Vince Experience (The Rap)" on Origin Edition (on which he was the lead guitarist), "Desperate" from Suburban Legends, "Powerful Game" on Rump Shaker, and "Rose Tint My World." Although he is not the only band member singing on these tracks, as "Brian and Vince Experience" and "Desperate" are performed with Brian Klemm, "Powerful Game" with Brian Klemm and Tim Maurer, and "Rose Tint My World" with Chris Batstone, Aaron Bertram, and Dallas Cook.

As of 2012, Walker, Klemm, drummer Matt Olson, and former Suburban Legends bassist Chris Maurer currently perform in a humorous blues rock side project called Personal Satisfaction. He is also a former member of Scott Klopfenstein's side project, The Littlest Man Band. Vince had played trumpet, but left in 2004 to pursue an education and focus on Suburban Legends. Walker makes an appearance alongside bandmate Brian Klemm in one of Big D and the Kids Table's several music videos for their cover of The Specials' "Little Bitch."

In addition to his work with Suburban Legends, Walker composed the score to 2014 independent British film, What Goes Up.

== Discography ==
=== As performer ===
==== With Suburban Legends ====
- Bomb Squad EP (1998) - trumpet
- Origin Edition (1999) - trumpet, lead guitar, co-lead vocals on "Brian and Vince Experience (The Rap)"
- Suburban Legends (2001) - trumpet, backing vocals
- Suburban Legends (Tim Remix) (2002) - trumpet, backing vocals, co-lead vocals on "Desperate"
- Rump Shaker (2003) - trumpet, vocals on "Blingity Bling" and "Powerful Game", backing vocals
- Dance Like Nobody's Watching (2006) - lead vocals
- Dance Like Nobody's Watching: Tokyo Nights (2007) - lead vocals
- Infectious (2007) - lead vocals
- Let's Be Friends and Slay the Dragon Together (2008) - lead vocals, trumpet
- Going on Tour (2010) - lead vocals, trumpet, acoustic guitar on "Doing It with You"
- Day Job (2012) - lead vocals, trumpet, acoustic guitar, keyboards

==== With The Littlest Man Band ====
- Better Book Ends (2004) - trumpet

==== With others ====
- This Gigantic Robot Kills by MC Lars (2008) - backing vocals on "This Gigantic Robot Kills"
- For the Win! by Uh Oh! Explosion (2009) - vocals on "Five Finger Discount"
- Hooray for Our Side by Hooray for Our Side (2013) - backing vocals, keyboards, trumpet
- "Some Kind of Miracle" by Ashley Tisdale (2013) - backing vocals
- "Episode I" by OC Ska Kids (2017) - Trumpet solo on "Guacamole"
- "Cancer Sucks" by OC Ska Kids (2017) - Trumpet, percussion, lead vocals
- "Music To Me" by Dropcase (2018) - Trumpet

=== As producer ===
- Day Job by Suburban Legends (2012)
- Hooray for Our Side by Hooray for Our Side (2013)
- Overture by Hooray for Our Side (2015)

=== As film composer ===
- What Goes Up (2014)
