= Justin Grennan =

American singer

- Also known as: Justin Grennan
- Born: Justin Fenton Grennan
- Genres: Soul, R&B
- Instrument: Vocalist
- Website: www.justingrennan.com

Justin Grennan is an American singer who is originally from Enumclaw, Washington, and now resides in Glendale, California. He appeared on NBC's The Voice in 2011.

== Career ==
Around 2006, Grennan met the producer Dallas Kruse and they collaborated and recorded Grennan's first album, Things I Should Have Said, in 2008. Since then, they have formed The Project, a five-piece soul band which includes Jorgen Ingmar (drums), Mikey Hachey (bass guitar), Justin Burrow (guitar) and Dallas Kruse (Hammond organ).

== Participation on The Voice ==
Grennan was the only male on Christina Aguilera's team on the 2011 season of The Voice. He was chosen for Aguilera's team after singing "Drops of Jupiter" in his blind audition; he was eliminated in the next round.

After The Voice was shown on NBC, Grennan did TV appearances, gigs, tours, radio interviews and recorded his second album at ZionStudios in Orange County, California.
