= Beijing to Boston =

Studio album (Split) by Big D and the Kids Table/Brain Failure
- Released: February 20, 2007
- Genre: Ska Punk
- Label: Bad News Records
- Producer: Jim Siegel

Big D and the Kids Table chronology
How It Goes (2004)	Beijing to Boston (2007)	Strictly Rude (2007)

Professional ratings
Review scores
Source	Rating
Alternative Press	3.5/5 stars
Punknews.org	4/5 stars

Beijing to Boston is a split album featuring Boston ska punk act Big D and the Kids Table and China punk act Brain Failure. It was released on February 20, 2007, only a month before the release of the highly anticipated Strictly Rude.

== Track listing ==
- Songs performed by Brain Failure
1. "Coming Down to Beijing" - 3:44
2. "Living in the City" - 2:53
3. "Time to Go" - 1:25
4. "Fall in Love 2008" - 4:38
5. "City Junk" - 2:15
6. "You're Gonna Die" - 2:55
- Songs performed by Big D and the Kids Table
1. "Faded" - 3:27
2. "Taking Back the Rhythm" - 2:58
3. "I'm Yours Boston" - 2:50
4. "Running Young" - 1:13
5. "Digging in Your Nails" - 2:16
6. "Ruin You" - 4:50

== Credits ==
- Dicky Barrett - Vocals
- Ken Casey - Vocals, Producer
- Jon Cohan - Drum Technician
- Paul E. Cuttler - Trombone, Producer, Group Member
- Steve Foote - Bass, Producer, Group Member
- Raymond Jeffrey - Engineer
- Ma Jiliang - Bass, Background Vocals, Group Member
- Xu Lin - Drums, Background Vocals, Group Member
- Dave Locke - Mastering
- David McWane - Vocals, Producer, Art Direction, Group Member
- Jon "JR" Reilly - Drums
- Ryan O'Connor - Saxophone, Producer, Group Member
- Marc Orrell - Organ
- Sean P. Rogan - Guitar, Background Vocals, Melodica, Producer, Group Member
- Xiao Rong - Guitar, Vocals, Group Member
- Jim Siegel - Producer, Engineer, Mixing
- Dan Stoppelman - Trumpet, Producer, Group Member
- Matt Teuten - Photography
