= Dance Like Nobody's Watching =

Dance Like Nobody's Watching may refer to:

- Dance Like Nobody's Watching (EP), a 2006 EP by Suburban Legends
- "Dance Like Nobody's Watching" (30 Rock), a 2012 episode of the sitcom 30 Rock
- "Dance Like Nobody's Watching" (song), a 2020 song by Iggy Azalea and Tinashe
- "Dance like nobody's watching", a saying adapted from a lyric in the song "Come from the Heart"
