= Beza (surname) =

Beza is a surname and notable people with the surname are as follows:

- Eugen Beza (born 1978), Romanian football player
- Luis Beza (born 1985), American musician
- Marcu Beza (1882–1949), Romanian poet
- Theodore Beza (1519–1605), French theologian
