= Electric Soul (disambiguation) =

Electric Soul is a 2014 album by Marlon Roudette.

Electric Soul may also refer to:

- Catamount Singers & Electric Soul Western Carolina University Pride of the Mountains Marching Band
- Electric Soul!, 1967 album by Buddy Terry, or its title song
