= Fluent in Stroll =

2009 studio album by Big D and the Kids Table

Studio album by Big D and the Kids Table
- Released: July 7, 2009
- Recorded: Camp Street Studios, Cambridge, Massachusetts
- Genre: Dub, ska, reggae
- Label: SideOneDummy
- Producer: Joe Gittleman

Big D and the Kids Table chronology
Strictly Rude (2007)	Fluent in Stroll (2009)	For the Damned, the Dumb & the Delirious (2011)

Professional ratings
Review scores
Source	Rating
Alternative Press	3.5/5 stars
Punknews.org	4/5 stars

Fluent In Stroll is the fifth studio album by the Boston ska punk band Big D and the Kids Table, released on July 7, 2009 by Side One Dummy Records. It was produced by Joe Gittleman of The Mighty Mighty Bosstones and features backing vocals by Sirae Richardson, Hayley Jane, and Nicole and Simone Olivia, who perform as the Doped Up Dollies. Its title refers to the band's new musical direction dubbed "stroll", a mix of double-Dutch, ska, reggae, and soul.

== Track listing ==
1. "Doped Up Dollies on a One Way Ticket to Blood" - 4:13
2. "Describing the Sky" - 4:29
3. "Not Fucking Around" - 3:34
4. "A Kiss a Week" - 3:53
5. "Been Wishing On" - 3:15
6. "Fluent in Stroll" - 2:49
7. "Down Around Here" - 3:51
8. "Chin Up, Boy!" - 3:28
9. "Where Did All the Women Go?" - 3:36
10. "Known to Be Blue" - 1:01
11. "I,I,I," - 3:32
12. "Stop, Look & Listen (Shake Life Up)" - 5:03
13. "My Thoughts Take Me Away" - 3:46
14. "We Can Live Anywhere!" - 3:41

== Chart positions ==
Year	Chart	Peak position
2009	Top Heatseekers	22

== Personnel ==
- David McWane - vocals, guitar
- Sean P. Rogan - guitar, organ, piano, vocals
- Steve Foote - bass guitar
- Derek Davis - drum kit, percussion, vocals
- Ryan O'Connor - saxophone, melodica, vocals
- Dan Stoppelman - trumpet
- Paul E. Cuttler - trombone
- Joe Gittleman - producer
- Paul Q. Kolderie - mixing
- Hayley Jane, Sirae Richardson, Nicole Olivia, Simone Olivia - backing vocals
- dj BC - scratching / samples
