= Dead Bands Party: A Tribute to Oingo Boingo =

Compilation album by Various artists
- Released: May 10, 2005
- Length: 55:12
- Label: Indianola Records
- Producer: Drew Hess

Dead Bands Party: A Tribute to Oingo Boingo is a tribute album by various artists to the band Oingo Boingo.

== Track listing ==
(all songs written by Danny Elfman, with the exception of 'Violent Love', originally written by Willie Dixon, uncredited on this album)

1. "Dead Man's Party" (Clear Static) – 4:14
2. "Only a Lad" (Let Go) – 3:22
3. "Violent Love" (The Matches and Zebrahead) – 2:35
4. "Little Girls" (The Rocky Raccoons) – 3:23
5. "We Close Our Eyes" (Reel Big Fish) – 3:52
6. "Grey Matter" (Rx Bandits) – 6:26
7. "Weird Science" (Hellogoodbye) – 2:27
8. "Better Luck Next Time" (Plain White T's) – 3:26
9. "Just Another Day" (Stairwell) – 5:34
10. "On the Outside" (Suburban Legends) – 3:59
11. "Stay" (Over It) – 3:27
12. "The Controller" (The Aquabats) – 3:32
13. "Not My Slave" (Jessica Burgan) – 3:45
14. "When the Lights Go Out" (Finch) – 5:10
