= Strictly Rude =

Studio album by Big D and the Kids Table
- Released: March 20, 2007
- Recorded: Camp Street Studios; Cambridge, MA
- Genres: Dub, ska punk, reggae
- Length: 51:13
- Label: SideOneDummy
- Producer: Joe Gittleman

Big D and the Kids Table chronology
Beijing to Boston (2007)	Strictly Rude (2007)	Fluent In Stroll (2009)

Professional ratings
Review scores
Source	Rating
Absolutepunk.net	(81%)
Allmusic	4/5 stars
Alternative Press	4.5/5 stars
Punknews.org	4/5 stars
Punkbands.com	5/5 stars

Strictly Rude is the fourth studio album from Boston ska punk act Big D and the Kids Table. The album peaked at 42 on Billboard's Top Heatseekers chart.

The album's title track is largely derived from Althea & Donna's "Uptown Top Ranking" which topped the UK charts in February 1978. While most of the song's lyrics have been rewritten to bear little semblance to the original version, the song's chorus sees the original line "Strictly Roots" changed to the track and album's title, "Strictly Rude".

"Noise Complaint" rose to popularity based on its popular DIY music video.

== Track listing ==
No.	Title	Length
1.	"Steady Riot"	2:38
2.	"Noise Complaint"	3:12
3.	"Shining On"	3:14
4.	"Souped-Up Vinyl"	3:43
5.	"Deadpan"	2:31
6.	"Snakebite"	3:29
7.	"Strictly Rude"	4:45
8.	"Try Out Your Voice"	2:49
9.	"Hell On Earth"	3:05
10.	"Fly Away"	1:46
11.	"Breaking The Bottle"	2:15
12.	"Raw Revolution"	2:53
13.	"Relocate The Beat"	3:43
14.	"The One"	4:01
15.	"She Knows Her Way"	7:22
16.	"Half Way Home (Vinyl Only)"	4:24

== Chart positions ==
Year	Chart	Peak position
2007	Top Heatseekers	41

== Personnel ==
- David McWane - vocals, melodica
- Sean P. Rogan - guitar, organ, piano, clavinet, vocals
- Steve Foote - bass
- Jon "JR" Reilly - drums, percussion, omnichord, vocals
- Ryan O'Connor - saxophone, melodica, vocals
- Dan Stoppelman - trumpet
- Paul E. Cuttler - trombone
- David and Alex - high-five on "Noise Complaint"
- Paul Q. Kolderie - mixing, shaker on "Shining On"
