= Brain Failure =

Chinese punk rock band

Brain Failure (脑浊; pinyin: Nǎozhuó) (1997–present) is a Chinese punk rock band based in Beijing, China. The band's songs are performed in Mandarin and English. Their main references are The Clash and Rancid.

== Members ==
- Xiao Rong (肖容) - Vocals, Electric guitar
- Wang Jian - Vocal, Electric guitar, Chorus
- Gao Yufeng - Electric bass guitar
- Xu Lin - Drums

== Discography ==
- Local Life (single) (demo version) (2013; released online only)
- Give You A Gift (single) (2013; released online only)
- Dare to be Tous Les Jours (album) (2012; released in China only)
- Nous Avons De La Chance (EP) (2011; released online only)
- Downtown Production (album) (2009; released in China only)
- A Box in The Broken Ball (EP) (2008)
- Coming Down to Beijing (album), 2007 a reselected issue of Turn on the Distortion released in China)
- Beijing to Boston (Split with Big D And The Kids Table, 2006)
- American Dreamer (2005)
- That's What I Know - track 11 (Compilation Give'em the Boot by Hell-Cat records world wild under Epitaph) (2004)
- Turn On The Distortion (2002) Remastered by Mel "Herbie" Kent
- Wuliao Contingent (Split album) (1999)
- Wuliaojundui - Christmas in Scream! (1998; various artists)

== See also ==
- Chinese rock
