= For the Damned, the Dumb & the Delirious =

Studio album by Big D and the Kids Table
- Released: July 5, 2011
- Recorded: 2011
- Genre: Ska punk
- Label: SideOneDummy
- Producers: Big D and the Kids Table

Big D and the Kids Table chronology
Fluent in Stroll (2009)	For the Damned, the Dumb & the Delirious (2011)	Stomp (2013)

For the Damned, the Dumb & the Delirious is the sixth studio album by the Boston ska punk band Big D and the Kids Table, released on July 5, 2011 by Side One Dummy Records. The two men pictured on the album cover are Jon Cauztik from the Have Nots and Mark Unseen from The Unseen.

The album is dedicated to Mitchell Dubey, a 23-year-old California-born punk musician and bicycle repairman who was murdered in New Haven, Connecticut in March 2011.

Professional ratings
Review scores
Source	Rating
Allmusic	3.5/5 stars
Rockfreaks.net	7.5/10 stars

== Track listing ==
All songs written by Big D and the Kids Table unless otherwise noted.

1. "Walls"
2. "Clothes Off" (Big D and the Kids Table/Brian Klemm)
3. "Modern American Gypsy"
4. "Best of Them All"
5. "Rotten"
6. "Brain's-a-Bomb"
7. "My Buddy's Back"
8. "Stringers"
9. "Destination Gone Astray" (Big D and the Kids Table/Sean P. Rogan)
10. "Roxbury (Roots n' Shoots)"
11. "Home"
12. "It's Raining Zombies on Wall Street"
13. "Set Me Straight"
14. "Not Our Fault"
15. "Riot Girl"
16. "Good Looking"
17. "One Day"
18. "As Long as We're Still Cool" (Bonus Track, track 30 on CD)

== Personnel ==
- David McWane – Vocals
- Sean P. Rogan – Vocals, Guitar, Harmonica
- Nick Pantazi – Guitar
- Steve Foote – Bass Guitar, Ukulele
- Derek Davis – Drums
- Ryan O’Connor – Saxophone, Melodica
- Chris Lucca – Trumpet
- Dan Stoppelman – Trumpet
- Paul Cuttler – Trombone
- Kyle M. Bagley – Trombone
- Gabe Feenberg – Accordion
- Anthony Carone – Piano, Organ
- Paul Dussault – Baritone Saxophone
- Gabe Rossi – Fiddle
- Sirae Richardson – Vocals
- Haley Jane – Vocals
- Brianne Finn – Vocals
- Mike McMillen – Engineer
- Ray Jeffrey – Engineer
- Jim Seigel – Mixing
