= Chawalaleng =

Studio album by Pilfers
- Released: 1999
- Genre: Ska
- Length: 53:57
- Label: Mojo
- Producer: John Avila

Pilfers chronology
Pilfers (1998)	Chawalaleng (1999)

Professional ratings
Review scores
Source	Rating
AllMusic	2.5/5 stars
PopMatters	6.0/10

Chawalaleng is the second album by the American band Pilfers, released in 1999 through Mojo Records.

The band calls its musical genre raggacore. "Legal Shot Pam Pam" was written by Coolie Ranx and was originally recorded on the Toasters album Dub 56.

== Track listing ==
All lyrics written by Coolie Ranx & Vinnie Nobile.

1. "Agua" – 3:22
2. "Lay" – 3:16
3. "Climbing" – 3:18
4. "Mr. Exploita" – 2:51
5. "Choose Life" – 2:59
6. "What's New (Here We Go Again) – 3:09
7. "Why" – 3:39
8. "Hypnotized" – 3:33
9. "Chawalaleng" – 4:11
10. "Skungle" – 2:33
11. "Saga" – 3:56
12. "Legal Shot Pam Pam" – 6:55
13. "P.C." – 4:36
14. "My Time Now" – 5:07

== Personnel ==
- Coolie Ranx - lead vocals
- Vinny Nobile - trombone, vocals
- Anna Milat-Meyer - bass guitar
- James Blanck - drums
- Nick Bacon - guitar
