= Wayne Rhoden =

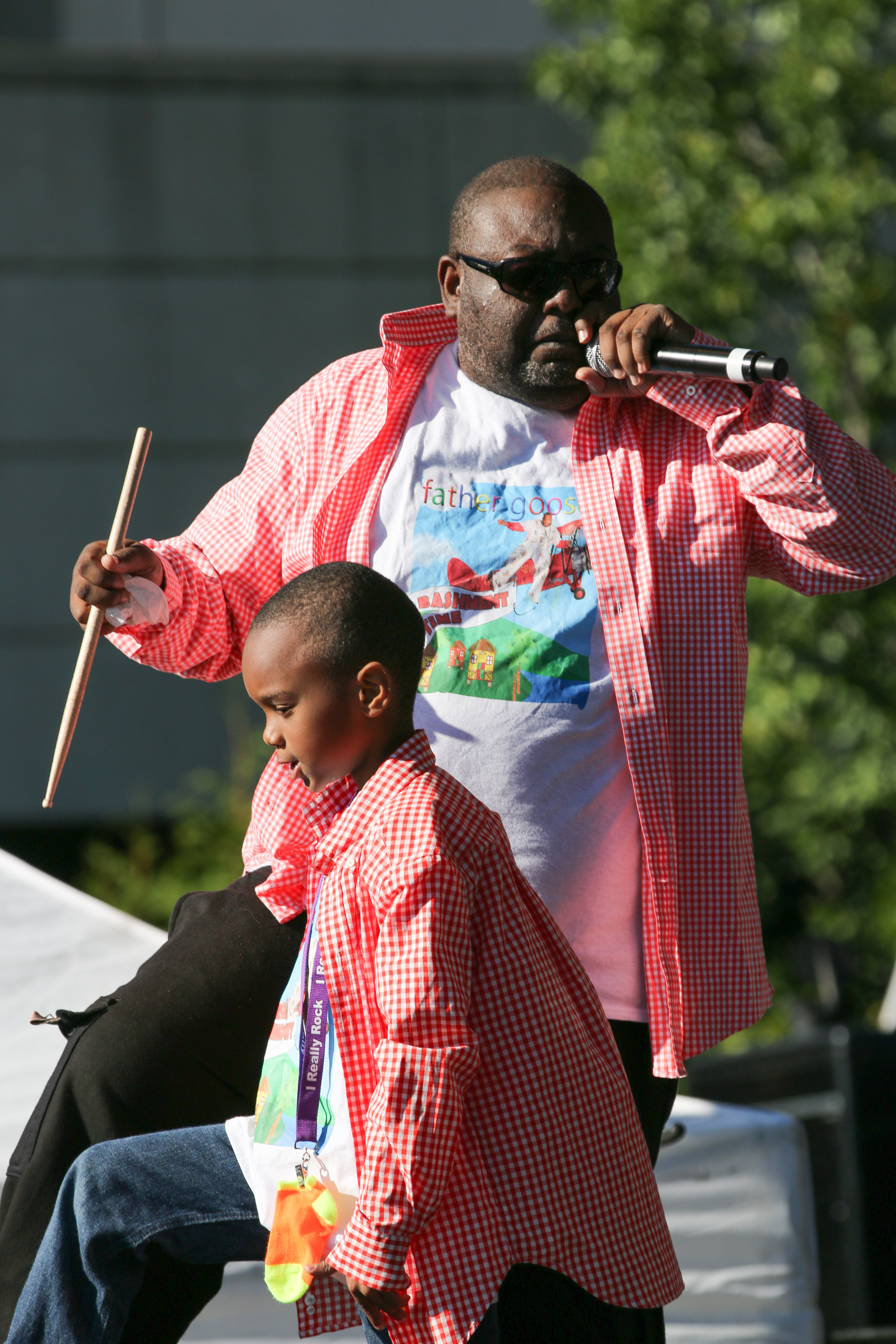
- Wayne Rhoden and his son Irie Goose

Background information
- Born: Wayne Rhoden; 1966
- Origin: Pleasant Farm, St. Catherine, Jamaica
- Died: 2024 (aged 57–58)
- Genres: Family Music, Children’s Music, Kindie rock, Reggae, Ska, Pop, Reggaeton, Folk
- Occupations: Producer, Songwriter, Artist
- Instruments: Vocals, Turntables
- Years active: 1982 – 2024
- Website: goosehut.com

Wayne Rhoden (1966–2024) was a music producer, singer, songwriter, sound engineer and video editor/director who is professionally known as the artist Father Goose Music, was the winner of the 18th Annual Independent Music Awards and the Grammy Awards with the group “Dan Zanes and Friends” also Nominated for the 64th Grammy Awards for Best Children's Album with the group 1 Tribe Collective and he was also known as Rankin Don and Don Chibaka. Seen on the Disney Channel, he also peaked at # 7 on the Billboard Reggae Chart.

== Biography ==
Wayne Rhoden, known professionally as Father Goose, was a Jamaican-born producer, singer, and songwriter.

He made a name for himself in the underground circuit in Jamaica and on the streets of Brooklyn, New York under the personas of Rankin Don and Don Chibaka. As Father Goose he performs children's music, Kindie rock, and reggae-fied nursery rhymes, often in the “Dan Zanes and Friends” ensemble, including in a series of Disney videos entitled “House Party Time.”

=== Early life ===
Wayne Rhoden was born in Linstead, Jamaica to Joyce and James Rhoden and grew up in Jamaica / New York / Florida. Like many musical artists, his debut performance occurred at a young age. He recalls that his first singing performance happened at the age of five, using his family and friends as his audience. On subsequent occasions, he would serve as DJ for parties thrown by his parents. Later he performed in a PTA-hosted Ash Wednesday fundraising fair at his Ewarton grade school.

He attended Erasmus High School in Brooklyn, New York, and then went on to pursue a career in electrical engineering. But as fate would have it, he was drawn to his first love, music.

=== Musical career ===
In the 1980s as Rankin Don he recorded the hits Can't Find Me Love and Baddest DJ and in the 90s the Real McCoy, Black Queen, and Green Card. He was later introduced to producers who urged him to record for the mainstream labels. He has performed at concerts with some well-known artists including, Rosanne Cash, Suzanne Vega, Gregory Isaacs, Grammy nominees Beres Hammond and Freddie McGregor; and past Grammy winners Shabba Ranks, Shaggy, and Beenie Man.

His relationship with musician Dan Zanes was initiated by his mother, who while working for Zanes, suggested that he should meet her son and check out his talent.

In the 2000s as Father Goose he was featured on several Dan Zanes albums such as Rocket Ship Beach and Catch That Train! and also released three of his own albums: Color with Father Goose, It’s a Bam Bam Diddly, and Bashment Time.

In 2008 as Don Chibaka he gave his performance on the Etcetera single Dance Like That (Remix) featuring Richie Stephens and Kevin Lyttle.

=== Personal life ===
Rhoden was the father of two, his son (Irie Goose) who also sang and performed in his father's band.

In 2007, Rhoden discovered he had kidney failure. He received a kidney in December 2015 after eight years on dialysis, twice on life support and other complications. The kidney transplant was successful.

Rhoden died in September of 2024, as reported by Zanes via Instagram. Zanes described Rhoden as "committed to the idea of a mixed gender, multiracial band" and "one of the most open minded musicians I've known."

== Discography ==
=== Rankin Don ===
- 1989 One In A Million feat: Jerry Chapter
- 1990 Can't Find Mi Love feat: King Ledgi
- 1990 Whip Appeal feat: King Ledgi
- 1992 Baddest DJ
- 1994 Black Queen feat: Singing Singing
- 1996 Real McCoy
- 1996 The Big Race feat: Shelene Thomas, Round Head, Screechy Dan, General B, Baja Jedd
- 1997 Green Card feat: Mad Tempa
- 2004 More To Me feat: 'Coolie Ranx'
- 2004 You Are My Girl
- 2004 Big O feat: King Ledgi
- 2004 She She Remix feat: Little Lenny, Ricky 10
- 2004 Push Up On Me feat: Snypah
- 2004 Chance Remix feat: Fyona Sanderson
- 2004 It ain't over feat: Mad Lion
- 2004 Give me one more chance feat: Wayne Smith, King Ledgi
- 2013 You're My Girl
- 2013 You Mate
- 2013 Marlena
- 2013 Praise to Jah
- 2014 God & Me

=== Don Chibaka ===
- 2008 Dance Like That (Remix) feat: Etcetera, Richie Stephens, Kevin Lyttle

=== Father Goose Music ===
- 2000 Rocket Ship Beach
- 2001 Family Dance
- 2002 Night Time!
- 2003 House Party (Grammy nominated, for Best Children's Album)
- 2003 Color with Father Goose
- 2005 All Around the Kitchen!
- 2006 Catch That Train! (Grammy Award Winning Album)
- 2007 It's a Bam Bam Diddly (Peaked #7 for 2 weeks on the Billboard Charts, Parents' Choice Award Winning Album and also nominated for

The 8th Independent Music Award for Best Children's Album & also on the Grammy Ballot, for Best Children's Album)

- 2008 The Welcome Table
- 2009 76 Trombones
- 2011 Little Nut Tree
- 2013 Swing Low "Bear Hunt!"
- 2013 I love U "Bear Hunt!"
- 2014 Get Loose and Get Together!: The Best of Dan Zanes
- 2014 Bashment Time
- 2015 I Love u (JZ Remix) "Rocksteady"
- 2016 Dance to the Reggae Rhythm, Aaron Nigel Smith album "One"
- 2016 Father Goose 7
- 2016 Irie Christmas feat. Dan Zanes, Sonia De Los Santos, Kate Ferber & Danger D.
- 2017 Father Goose Music "Friday" feat. Little Goose, Elena Moon Park, Yami Bolo, Itimo
- 2017 Father Goose Music "Friday Da Remix"
- 2017 Father Goose Music "In The Mirror"
- 2017 Father Goose Music "I Wanna Love U" Featuring Josh and the Jamtones, Aaron Nigel Smith, Little Goose, Itimo
- 2017 Dan Zanes Lead Belly Baby "Polly Wee" also feat. Little Goose (Independent Music Award winner for Best Children's Album)
- 2018 Father Goose Music "I Have A Dream" feat. Itimo
- 2018 Free Bubbles by Mista Cookie Jar
- 2018 King Of The Dance Party (61st Annual Grammy Awards Ballot also nominated for The 17th Independent Music Award)
- 2018 Rising Star (feat. Mikayla & Itimo)
- 2019 La Bamba
- 2019 I Can Make it (EP)
- 2019 Rise Up Now (62nd Annual Grammy Awards Ballot)
- 2019 I'm A Gamer by Irie Goose
- 2020 Life
- 2020 Dance With You
- 2020 Allo Allo Allo
- 2020 Come Again
- 2020 Lemonade & Sunshine
- 2020 Make It
- 2020 Stop da Bullying Irie Goose feat. Father Goose Music
- 2020 Da Gamer Irie Goose feat. Father Goose Music
- 2020 Lemonade
- 2021 Live Your Life feat. Etcetera, iRiE GoOsE, Lucy Kalantari, Danni Ai and David Allan Rivera.
- 2021 Voice of a Child
- 2021 Invisible (Acoustic)
- 2021 May the Force Be with You (Intro)
- 2021 Oh God!!! (Feat. Drsya)
- 2021 Turn It Up (Intro)
- 2021 Nice Meeting You Too
- 2021 The Whisper (Intro)
- 2021 I Testify (Feat. Drsya)
- 2021 I Am (Intro)
- 2021 Black Brown White
- 2021 Why (Feat. Drsya, iRiE GooSe and Etcetera)
- 2021 Father GooSe Music (Intro)
- 2021 Invisible (Bonus Track)
- 2021 One Tribe - 1 Tribe Collective (Nominated for 64th Grammy Awards for Best Children's Album)
- 2022 Make Some Change (Aaron Nigel Smith, Red Yarn feat. Father Goose Music)
- 2022 A Ticket To Ride (Donikkl feat. Father Goose Music & Irie Goose) (Winner of the Funky Kids Radio Awards)
- 2022 What If (Feat. Drsya and iRiE GooSe)
- 2023 The Leader in You (Esther Crow feat. Father Goose Music)
- 2023 Calling Me
- 2023 Calling Me (Acoustic)
- 2023 Listen Lead Love
- 2023 16 Victoria Street
- 2023 ARISE TOGETHER - CHILDREN OF THE WORLD (Vol-2)

== Awards and nominations ==
- 2004 Parents' Choice Award Audio: Music What Is It? Musical Math & Science
- 2006 49th Annual Grammy Awards (with Dan Zanes and Friends), Best Musical Album for Children, Catch That Train!
- 2008 Parents' Choice Award Audio: Music It’s A Bam Bam Diddly
- 2008 Independent Music Awards Nominee for Best Children's Album, It’s A Bam Bam Diddly
- 2019 Independent Music Awards Nominee for Best Children's Song, Nice To Meet U from the album King Of The Dance Party
- 2023 The Funky Kids Radio Global Awards Audio: Music A Ticket To Ride
