= Stomp (album) =

Studio album by Big D and the Kids Table
- Released: June 11, 2013
- Genre: Ska punk
- Length: 38:10
- Label: Strictly Rude Records

Big D and the Kids Table chronology
For the Damned, the Dumb & the Delirious (2011)	Stomp (2013)	Stroll (2013)

Stomp, along with Stroll, are the seventh and eighth studio albums by the Boston ska punk band Big D and the Kids Table, released simultaneously on June 11, 2013, by Strictly Rude Records.

Dedicated to the memory of Anthony Spaulding, an Allston resident, sound engineering student, and Big D fan who was murdered on January 1, 2013.

== Track listing ==
1. "Stepping Out" - 3:03
2. "Shit Tattoos" - 2:27
3. "Social Muckery" - 1:55
4. "Pinball" - 3:38
5. "Static" - 2:00
6. "The Noise" - 2:08
7. "Temperamental" - 2:07
8. "Don't Compare Me to You" - 2:37
9. "Dirty Daniel" - 4:03
10. "Pitch 'n' Sway" - 3:53
11. "You Treat Everyone Like Shit" - 3:33
12. "Line Selector" - 2:49
13. "No Moaning at the Bar" - 5:59

== Personnel ==
- David McWane – Vocals, Dubs, Tambourine
- Derek Davis – Drums, Tambourine, Shaker
- Alex Stern – Guitar, Piano, Organ, Vocals
- Ryan O'Connor – Saxophone, Melodica, Vocals
- Stephen Foote – Bass Guitar
- Marc Flynn – Vocals
- Ben Corrigan – Vocals
- Billy Kottage – Trombone
- Nate Leskovic – Trombone
- Paul E. Cutler – Trombone
- Matthew Giorgio – Trumpet
- Dan Stoppelman – Trumpet
- Logan La Barbera – Trombone
- Andy Bergman – Baritone Saxophone
- Casey Gruttadauria – Organ, Piano
- Steve Jackson – Vocals (Courtesy of The Pietasters)
