= Stroll (album) =

Studio album by Big D and the Kids Table
- Released: June 11, 2013
- Genres: Reggae, dub
- Length: 49:40
- Label: Strictly Rude Records

Big D and the Kids Table chronology
Stomp (2013)	Stroll (2013)	Strictly Covered (2019)

Stroll, along with Stomp, are the seventh and eighth studio albums by the Boston ska punk band Big D and the Kids Table, released simultaneously on June 11, 2013 by Strictly Rude Records.

Dedicated to the memory of Martin Richard, Krystle Campbell, Lingzi Lu, Sean Collier and the many wounded at 2013 Boston Marathon bombing.

== Track listing ==
1. "Knife" - 6:02
2. "Young Suckers" - 2:45
3. "Put It In a Song" - 4:14
4. "Lynn, Lynn the City of Sin" - 2:59
5. "Main Squeeze" - 2:53
6. "What I Got" - 2:32
7. "I'm Just an Idea" - 4:09
8. "Spit That Champagne Out" - 2:48
9. "Tell Me Why" - 3:44
10. "Moment of Weakness" - 3:35
11. "Drink Me Down" - 2:52
12. "Our 1st Day" - 3:20
13. "Trust in Music" - 7:45
14. "Better Off Insane"- digital only bonus track

== Personnel ==
- David McWane – Vocals, Dubs, Guitar, Foot Stomps, Tambourine
- Alex Stern - Guitar, Piano, Organ, Mandolin, Vocals
- Derek Davis - Drums, Tambourine, Shaker
- Ryan O'Connor - Tenor, Saxophone, Vocals
- Stephen Foote - Bass Guitar
- Brie Finn - Vocals, Claps
- Erin MacKenzie - Vocals, Claps
- Sirae Richardson - Vocals, Claps
- Rich Stein - Percussion
- Billy Kottage - Trombone
- Nate Leskovic - Trombone
- Matthew Giorgio - Trumpet
- Dan Stoppelman - Trumpet
- Paul E. Cutler - Trombone
- Logan La Barbera - Trombone
- Andy Bergman - Baritone Saxophone
- Coolie Ranx - Vocals (Courtesy of the Pilfers)
- Casey Gruttadauria - Organ, Mellotron, Melodica, Piano, Synth
- Dana Colley - Baritone, Bass Saxophone (Courtesy of Morphine)
