= An Army of Shapes Between Wars =

Studio album by Action Action
- Released: January 24, 2006
- Recorded: 2005
- Genre: Indie rock
- Length: 62:46
- Label: Victory Records

Action Action chronology
Don't Cut Your Fabric to This Year's Fashion (2004)	An Army of Shapes Between Wars (2006)	The Ones Who Get It Are The Ones Who Need Not To Know (2010)

Professional ratings
Review scores
Source	Rating
AbsolutePunk.net	(57%)
Allmusic	3.5/5 stars
Ox-Fanzine	7/10
Punknews.org	2/5 stars

An Army of Shapes Between Wars is the second album by the Long Island band Action Action, released in 2006 by Victory Records.

== Release ==
On November 23, 2005, An Army of Shapes Between Wars was announced for release in two months' time. Until the end of the year, Action Action went on a US tour with Men, Women & Children. On January 18, 2006, "Paper Cliche" was posted on the band's PureVolume profile. An Army of Shapes Between Wars was made available for streaming on January 23, 2006 through AOL Music, before being released the following day through Victory Records. To promote it, the band played a series of in-store performances at various record stores on the East Coast in January and February 2006, which was followed by a support slot for Men, Women & Children on their headlining West Coast tour.

In March 2006, the band went on a West Coat tour with Something for Rockets. After this, they went on a cross-country US tour with the Sounds and Morningwood until May 2006. They embarked on a US tour in June and July 2006 with the Matches; Portugal. The Man, the Classic Crime, Schoolyard Heroes, and Rediscover appeared on the first half, while Portugal. The Man, Valencia, Rediscover, and New London Fire featured on the second half. Following a Victory Records showcase at CMJ Festival in November 2006, the band went on a short Midwestern US tour with My American Heart, Pistolita, and Danger Radio.

== Track listing ==
All tracks are written by Mark Thomas Kluepfel.

No.	Title	Length
1.	"Smoke and Mirrors"	4:26
2.	"Oh My Dear It's Just Chemical Frustration"	3:51
3.	"A Tornado; an Owl"	2:52
4.	"Sleep Paralysis"	5:24
5.	"The Game"	3:17
6.	"Paper Cliché"	3:11
7.	"120 Ways to Kill You: An Illustrated Children's Book"	5:41
8.	"What Temperature Does Air Freeze At?"	5:40
9.	"The Other 90% of the Iceberg"	3:08
10.	"Analogue Logic"	3:04
11.	"Don't Shoot the Messenger (Not My Idea)"	3:14
12.	"Attached to the Fifth Story"	7:14
13.	"The Blanket Truth"	5:37
