= Edna's Goldfish =

- Origin: New York, United States
- Genre: Ska punk
- Years active: 1997–2000, 2005, 2009, 2011–2012
- Label: Moon Ska Records

Edna's Goldfish was an American ska punk band from Long Island, New York.

Together from 1997 to 2000, their studio albums include Before You Knew Better (1998) and The Elements of Transition (1999), both released on Moon Ska Records. The video for their song "Veronica Sawyer" received some airplay on the MTV show 120 Minutes. The band toured with other ska-punk bands such as The Toasters, Catch 22, Mustard Plug, Reel Big Fish, and Less Than Jake.

After their 2000 tour with Rx Bandits and The Gadjits, the band decided to split in order to pursue other interests. Singer Brian Diaz went on to form The Reunion Show with ex-members of Step Lively and The Lightweights, and trombonist Ian McKenzie continued to play with Catch 22. Bass player Kris Baldwin played as a studio musician for Epic Records and also recorded and played with Action Action. As of 2019, Kris Baldwin works for Warner Bros. as an animation technical director.

In the beginning of April 2005, the members of Edna's Goldfish reunited to play a cancer benefit concert at the Crazy Donkey, in Farmingdale, New York, for a friend of the band who had cancer.

In 2009, Edna's Goldfish played their first show in four years on May 2 at the Bamboozle Festival in East Rutherford, New Jersey at the Meadowlands Sports Complex.

In November 2011, Connecticut's Asbestos Records and Chicago's Underground Communiqué Records launched a fundraiser together on Kickstarter to release "Before You Knew Better" on vinyl, among other third-wave ska classics from Pilfers, The Pietasters, and Suburban Legends. If the funding goal is met by January 18, 2012, the records were due to be released later that year. The track "Better Days" is included as a bonus track on this release.

Edna's Goldfish performed to a capacity crowd on October 21, 2012, at Gramercy Theatre in New York City.

== Members ==
- Brian Diaz - vocals
- David A. Galea - trumpet
- Gary Henderson - trumpet
- Vincent McAuliffe - guitar
- Michael Warner - drums, vocals
- Tom Comerford - trombone
- Kristopher Baldwin - bass

=== Other members ===
- David Ringel - bass (1997–1999)
- Dave Sacrastano - bass (1997)
- Jon Middleman - bass (2 songs on "Before You Knew Better")
- Dave Waldo - keyboards (in "Veronica Sawyer" off of "Elements of Transition")
- Matt Holmgren - trombone
- Ian McKenzie - trombone (replaced Tom Comerford before leaving for Catch 22)
- Dave Solomon - Trombone for the reunion/benefit show
