= Mikey Hachey =

American bassist (born 1985)

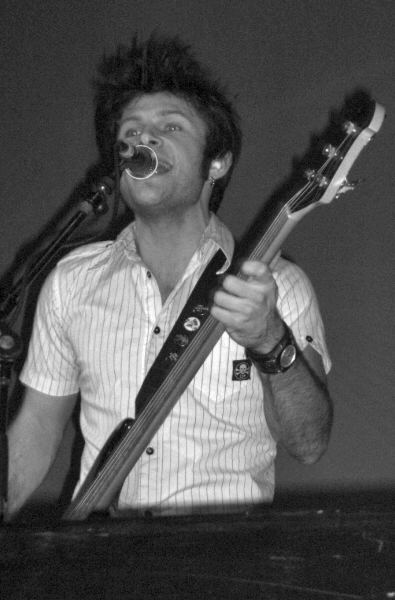
- Mikey Hachey playing bass at Plush in Jacksonville, Florida on their Fall of Ska Tour with Reel Big Fish in 2006

Background information
- Also known as: Mikey Hachey
- Born: Michael Joseph Hachey; January 29, 1985 (age 41); United States
- Origin: Orange County, California, United States
- Genres: Third wave ska, funk, disco
- Instruments: Bass guitar, Vocals
- Years active: 2004–present

Michael Joseph "Mikey" Hachey (born January 29, 1985) is an American bassist, best known as a former member of the third-wave ska band, Suburban Legends. He joined the band in November 2004, replacing Chris Maurer on bass guitar, after his friend Derek Lee Rock (the drummer of Suburban Legends) offered him an audition to play bass for his "little ol' band" called Suburban Legends. Before Suburban Legends, Mike played bass in a band called Perilous, which also featured Ashley Hittesdorf (also known as Ashley Costello), vocalist from New Years Day, as a member. Hachey left Suburban Legends in 2010, and is a regular collaborator with artists such as Dallas Kruse and Justin Grennan and is the in-house bassist for ZionStudios in CA. Though no longer a member of the band, Hachey recorded bass on most of the tracks for Suburban Legends' 2012 album, Day Job, and is credited as an additional musician on the album.

Hachey was the bassist for Cirque du Soleil's Viva Elvis at the Aria Resort & Casino on the Las Vegas Strip. After that show's run ended, Hachey was cast as the bassist for the Las Vegas production of Million Dollar Quartet at Harrah's Las Vegas.

Hachey attended Cal State Fullerton and was accepted into their Department of Music as a Music Education major. He also joined Phi Mu Alpha Sinfonia, a music fraternity.
