= High Voltage Magazine =

Pop Culture Magazine

High Voltage Magazine is a magazine that was first published in November 2003.

== History ==
High Voltage Magazine was created in 2003 as an online music publication, founded by Chelsea Schwartz. The first print issue was issued in March 2006. and featured The Shys on the cover. A second print issue was released in March 2007. Printing was suspended after this date to focus on online content; however, on October 1, 2011, a printed format was re-introduced.

High Voltage Magazine hosts monthly events at local clubs in Los Angeles, showcasing new talent.

In April 2012, High Voltage changed its editorial format from a music magazine to a broader lifestyle publication.

In 2017, High Voltage launched monthly tabletop gaming events in Los Angeles County and Orange County.
