= Aaron Bertram =

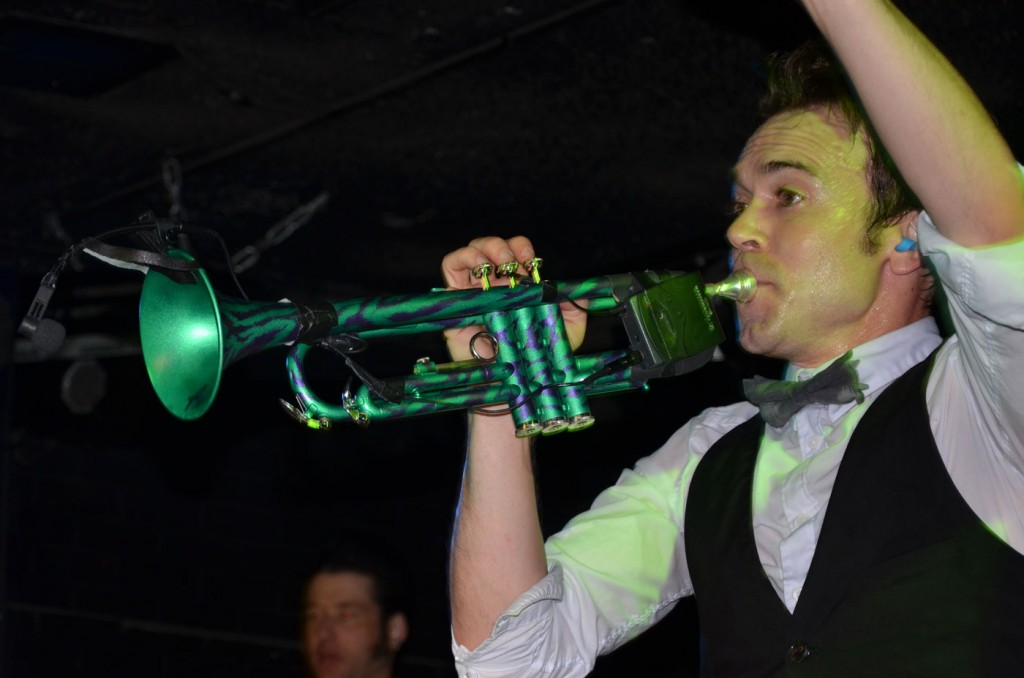

Background information
- Born: Aaron Bertram; April 3, 1981 (age 45)
- Origin: Orange County, California, USA
- Genres: Ska-punk
- Occupation: Musician
- Instrument: Trumpet
- Years active: 1998–present
- Website: http://www.kidsimaginenation.com

Aaron Bertram (born April 3, 1981, in Lubbock, Texas) is a trumpet player for third wave ska band Suburban Legends, and member of the children's music group Kids Imagine Nation. In the past he has taught music and movement to preschool students in Orange County, CA. His music program was called Little Rockstars. He launched an online Streaming Service for Children's Entertainment and Arts Education called KINTV in March of 2020, where he currently performs and teaches music.

He was a trumpet player for the third-wave ska band Suburban Legends from the band's origin in 1998 to May 2005, when he left to start his company, Kids Imagine with wife, Rachel Charest. He was known for doing a lot of backing vocals in the band and originated the idea of the band's signature choreography. Aaron returned for a final performance with the band on November 29, 2005, at Huntington Beach High School for a benefit show for the Ryan Dallas Cook Memorial Fund. Since the summer of 2009, Aaron has been performing with Suburban Legends at local shows. As of November 2010, he is listed as an official member of the band.

In addition to playing trumpet for Suburban Legends, he also performed vocals for the band's cover of the Gummi Bears theme song, the band's cover of Rose Tint My World and the song Powerful Game on the album Rump Shaker.

Aaron is currently writing Children's Music under the name Kids Imagine Nation with Rachel Charest and Vince Walker.

== Appearances ==
- Eve as Rita's Assistant, 2005
- Jerry Lewis MDA Telethon with Suburban Legends, 2003, 2004, 2009
- Performed several shows with Suburban Legends throughout much of 2009 upon the departure of the band's trumpet player Luis Beza

=== Extra Work ===
- American Wedding (2003)
- Raising Helen (2004)
- NCIS
- Sledge: The Untold Story (2005)
- Cuts
- Grandma's Boy (2006)
- Just for Kicks (2006)
- CSI: Miami
- D-War (2007)
