= Action Action =

American rock bank (2004–2010)

- Origin: Long Island, New York, U. S.
- Genres: Indie rock; post-punk; electronica
- Years active: 2004–2010
- Label: Independent
- Spinoff of: The Reunion Show
- Past members: Adam Manning; Dan Leo; Mark Thomas Kluepfel; Clarke Foley; Kris Baldwin

Action Action was an American indie rock band, formerly signed to Victory Records.

== History ==
Action Action was formed in 2004 by members of The Reunion Show, Count The Stars and Diffuser. The band signed with Victory Records and released their first album, Don't Cut Your Fabric to This Year's Fashion (2004), and released their second album An Army of Shapes Between Wars in 2006. In the same year, Action Action toured with Maxeen, Morningwood, The Sounds, Jonezetta, We Are The Fury, The Cult and Something for Rockets on various legs of their US tours.

The song "Paper Cliché" was featured in the video game, MVP 06: NCAA Baseball.

Their song "Dream Within A Dream" was featured in a 2009 Gillette commercial. The song was included on their self-released 2010 album The Ones Who Get It Are The Ones Who Need Not To Know.

== Line-up ==
Former members

- Mark Thomas Kluepfel – vocals, guitar, synth, songwriter
- Adam Manning – guitar
- Clarke Foley – bass
- Dan Leo – drums, percussion
- Kris Baldwin – guitar

== Discography ==
=== Albums ===
- Don't Cut Your Fabric to This Year's Fashion (Victory Records, 2004)
- An Army of Shapes Between Wars (Victory Records, 2006)
- The Ones Who Get It Are the Ones Who Need Not to Know (self-released, 2010)
