= The Reunion Show =

- Origin: Long Island, New York, U.S.
- Genre: Pop-punk
- Years active: 2000–2004, 2025
- Label: Victory
- Spinoffs: Action Action
- Spinoff of: Count the Stars
- Past members: Mark Thomas; Skully; Derrick Sherman; Brian Diaz; Adam Manning; Clark Foley

The Reunion Show is an American pop-punk band from Long Island, New York. They released one album on Victory Records before three members of the group moved on to form Action Action.

== History ==
The group formed from members of Step Lively, the Waiting Process, and Edna's Goldfish in 2000, and soon after began touring the United States. They released an EP in 2002 and signed to Victory Records a few months later. Their debut full-length, Kill Your Television, arrived late that year. The band toured with Taking Back Sunday before they were signed with Victory Records. In the summer of 2003 guitarist Sherman and bassist Diaz left the group and were replaced by two former members of Count the Stars, Adam Manning and Clarke Foley. However, the lineup did not last long; the group broke up and three members went on to form the Victory Records band Action Action. Derrick Sherman now plays lead guitar and does backup vocals in Long Island band, Sainthood Reps.

== Members ==
- Mark Thomas - vocals, guitar, keyboards (2000-2004)
- Skully - drums (2000-2004)
- Derrick Sherman - guitar (2000-2003)
- Brian Diaz - bass, vocals (2000-2003)
- Adam Manning - guitar (2003-2004)
- Clarke Foley - bass (2003-2004)

== Discography ==
Studio albums

- Kill Your Television (Victory Records, 2002)

EPs

- The Motion (Law of Inertia Records, 2002)
