= How It Goes =

Studio album by Big D and the Kids Table
- Released: 2004
- Recorded: The Outpost; Stoughton, MA
- Genres: Skate punk; ska punk
- Length: 76:16
- Labels: Springman Records; Moon Ska
- Producer: Jim Siegel

Big D and the Kids Table chronology
Split 7" with Melt Banana (2003)	How It Goes (2004)	Salem Girls (2005)

Professional ratings
Review scores
Source	Rating
Absolutepunk.net	(92%)
Punknews.org	3.5/5 stars

How It Goes is the third studio album by Boston ska punk band, Big D and the Kids Table, released in 2004. Strong language is used on the album and consequently it is released with the parental advisory sticker for strong language on songs such as "LAX".

== Track listing ==
1. "The Sounds of Allston Village" - 2:20
2. "LA.X" - 5:05
3. "New Nail Bed" - 3:37
4. "If We Want To" - 4:10
5. "Flashlight" - 5:10
6. "Girls Against Drunk Bitches" - 3:23
7. "You Lost, You're Crazy" - 2:08
8. "Bender" - 3:32
9. "Safe Haven" - 4:31
10. "You're Me Now" - 3:40
11. "Voice Alone" - 5:35
12. "My Girlfriend's On Drugs" - 3:07
13. "President" - 2:37
14. "Cutshow" - 3:30
15. "Little Bitch" - 2:17
16. "(We All Have To) Burn Something" - 3:17
17. "175" - 4:30
18. "Chicago" - 3:52
19. "How It Goes" - 5:45
20. "Moment Without An End" - 4:10

== Credits ==
- David McWane - vocals
- Sean P. Rogan - guitar/backing vocals
- Steve Foote - bass
- Paul E. Cuttler - trombone
- Dan Stoppelman - trumpet
- Chris Bush - tenor sax
- Jon Reilly - drums (performs only in music videos, not on album)
- Shawn Florezzz - merchandise, driving, organizing, advice, and ideas
- Drums performed by Jason Gilbert
