= Count the Stars =

American pop punk band

Background information
- Origin: Albany, New York, U.S.
- Genres: Pop-punk
- Years active: 1995–2003
- Label: Victory
- Spinoffs: The Reunion Show; Action Action
- Past members: Chris Kasarjian; David Shapiro; Clarke Foley; Adam Manning

Count the Stars was an American pop-punk band from Albany, New York, that formed in 1995. After recording two albums, one with Chicago's Victory Records, the band split up in late 2003.

== Biography ==
Count the Stars formed after the breakup of Chris Kasarjian, David Shapiro, and Clarke Foley's old band from high school. They had decided they wanted to make music their primary focus in life so Chris began writing new songs with David Shapiro and Clarke Foley. Adam Manning, a long time friend from another local band, joined them completing the band's lineup.

As an unsigned band named Visual Reason, they recorded "Another Useless Night," their first album, and released it on Dreamsand Records. They sold upward of 5,000 copies. They went to malls and local shows to promote the new album and developed a strong underground following.

The band signed to the Chicago based Victory Records. They then recorded the early 2003 release Never Be Taken Alive. After the release, they toured with bands such as Taking Back Sunday, The Early November, Fall Out Boy, and Copeland. They also appeared on the Vans Warped Tour. Their touring came to an abrupt stop when they were in a van accident in September 2003. After the accident, they soon embarked on a full US tour at the beginning of November, which was cut short when the band suddenly and officially broke up on November 30, 2003. The band stated that they were not compelled to continue their musical effort. They also made it clear that they would not point fingers or give out specific details as to why they split.

Clarke Foley and Adam Manning both went on to become members of the bands The Reunion Show and Action Action.

David Shapiro went on to become a talent agent for United Talent Agency and The Agency Group, before co-founding his own San Diego-based agency in 2018, Sound Talent Media. In 2020, Shapiro helped create the National Independent Talent Organization (NITO) to support music professionals during the COVID-19 pandemic. He also owned a record label named Velocity Records and a flight school, called Velocity Aviation. He died on May 22, 2025, while piloting a small plane that crashed in San Diego.

== Band members ==
- Chris Kasarjian – Vocals and rhythm guitar
- Adam Manning – Lead guitar
- Clarke Foley – Bass
- Dave Shapiro – Drums

== Discography ==
- Another Useless Night (2001) - Dream Sand Records
- Never Be Taken Alive (2003) - Victory Records
