= The Gipsy Hill =

Studio album by Big D and the Kids Table
- Released: 2002
- Genre: Ska punk
- Length: LP: 26:13 / EP: 24:09
- Label: Fork in Hand Records

Big D and the Kids Table chronology
Look What You've Done	The Gipsy Hill (2002)	Porch Life (2003)

Professional ratings
Review scores
Source	Rating
Punknews.org	4.5/5 stars

The Gipsy Hill is the second studio album by the ska band Big D and the Kids Table. Released in 2002; there are two versions of the release: the EP version, and an LP version that adds the song "Apologies." The instrumental "Great Song" features, among other things, lines of dialog from the Vaughn Meader album The First Family.

== Track listing ==
1. "Check List" - 2:25
2. "Evil Girl/Angry Girl" - 3:00
3. "Wailing Paddle" (The Rudiments) - 3:35
4. "Great Song" - 3:25
5. "Those Kids Suck" (T.K.S) - 1:20
6. "Apologies" - 2:04 (On the LP version, not the EP version)
7. "What the Hell Are You Going to Do?" - 0:12
8. "Find Out (Damaged and Destroyed)" - 2:43
9. "Scenester" - 4:30
10. "The Difference" - 2:36
11. "New England" (Jonathan Richman) - 3:37

== Credits ==
- Chris Bush — tenor saxophone
- Paul Cuttler — trombone
- Steve Foote — bass
- Paul Cuttler — trombone
- David McWane — vocals
- Sean P. Rogan — guitar
- Dan Stoppelman — trumpet
