= Pilfers =

American ska band

- Origin: New York City, New York, United States
- Genres: Ska
- Years active: 1997–2001, 2008–present
- Labels: Mojo
- Members: Coolie Ranx; Nick Bacon; James Blanck; Anna Milat-Meyer
- Past members: Dave Karcich; Carl Barc; Vinny Nobile; Ben Basile; Billy Kottage
- Website: http://www.pilfersnyc.net

Pilfers are an American ska band formed in 1997, when former Toasters vocalist, Coolie Ranx, at the urging of Pietaster's vocalist Steve Jackson, joined with former Bim Skala Bim trombonist, Vinny Nobile. To complete the lineup, they recruited the Skinnerbox rhythm section of Anna Milat-Meyer on bass and James Blanck on drums, as well as guitar player, Nick Bacon of The Erratics.

== History ==
The band released one demo tape and played many New York City area shows before self-releasing their debut self-titled album in 1998. Response was positive enough, that the band was signed to Mojo Records, and they released Chawalaleng, one year later.

Soon after their major label debut, Anna Milat-Meyer and James Blanck left the group. Anna Milat-Meyer took a position, playing bass in Latin Jazz band Los Mas Valientes. Carl Barc of the band Ever Since Day One took over on bass and Dave Karcich, formerly of Spring Heeled Jack, took over on drums. The band continued to tour and build a strong fanbase. The band recorded a live show at CBGB's, intending for it to be released on CD. The album would never see release, however, as the band would split up on July 13, 2001.

Soon after the breakup, Coolie Ranx started a solo career, recording and playing shows around the world with back up band Fear Nuttin' Band. Nick Bacon joined Lost City Angels, who were looking for a second guitarist. On December 9, 2001, Nobile, Barc and Karcich, joined with Spring Heeled Jack guitarist, Mike Pellegrino to perform as Cenzo for a Ska For Youth benefit show to raise money for the Twin Tower Orphan Fund after the September 11 attacks on the World Trade Center. Karcich also took the drum position in Avoid One Thing, a band fronted by former Mighty Mighty Bosstones bass player, Joe Gittleman.

Karcich suffered a sudden brain aneurysm and died on April 5, 2002. Eight months later, a tribute show was held at Toad's Place in honor of Karcich. During a performance by Cenzo, Nobile and Barc welcomed Coolie Ranx and Nick Bacon onstage for a brief Pilfers reunion.

On November 4, 2005, the original five members of Pilfers reunited at the Knitting Factory in New York City for a sold-out show. Two more reunion shows took place at the same location on May 6, 2007, and January 25, 2008.

Coolie Ranx continued with his solo career as Vinny Nobile continued with Cenzo who promoted their album Maybe Now. Nick Bacon continued to pursue other musical projects in New York City, making his film debut in the 2007 Drew Barrymore and Hugh Grant film, Music and Lyrics. In 2009, he appeared on Rescue Me as a member of Mike Lombardi's band Apache Stone.

In 2008, Pilfers performed nine shows outside of NYC, including six shows in November with Sonic Boom Six. Pilfers performed two shows on the second leg of the Ska is Dead 4 tour. They played on November 14, 2009, at the Showcase Live in Foxboro, MA, and November 15, 2009, at the Starland Ballroom in Sayreville, NJ. Pilfers performed for a Haiti benefit concert at the Knitting Factory on April 23, 2010, with Karen Gibson Roc, Tsunami Rising, and Across The Aisle.

In November 2011, Connecticut's Asbestos Records and Chicago, IL's Underground Communiqué Records launched a fundraiser together on Kickstarter to release Pilfer's self-titled album on vinyl, among other third-wave ska classics from The Pietasters, Edna's Goldfish, and Suburban Legends. If the funding goal was met by January 18, 2012, the records were scheduled to be released later in the year.

In 2013, Pilfers toured with Reel Big Fish across the U.S. and Canada. Joining for this tour was Ben Basile (bass) and Billy Kottage (trombone/keys). In addition, Pilfers, with their original lineup, headlined a show at The Gramercy Theater on January 19, 2014. This show marked the first time that Coolie Ranx and his son, singer-songwriter/rapper Mark U, will share the same stage.

== Band members ==
=== Current line-up ===
- Coolie Ranx - lead vocals
- Dan Wenger - trombone and backing vocals
- Vic Rosario - guitar and backing vocals
- Guido Falivene - bass guitar and backing vocals
- Phillip Wartell - drums

=== 2013 Tour line-up ===
- Coolie Ranx - lead vocals
- Billy Kottage - trombone, vocals and keys
- Nick Bacon - guitar and vocals
- Ben Basile - bass guitar
- James Blanck - drums

=== 2000/2001 line-up ===
- Coolie Ranx - lead vocals
- Vinny Nobile - trombone and vocals
- Nick Bacon - guitar and backing vocals
- Carl Barc - bass guitar
- Dave Karchich - drums

=== Original line-up ===
- Coolie Ranx - lead vocals
- Vinny Nobile - trombone and vocals
- Nick Bacon - guitar and backing vocals
- Anna Milat-Meyer - bass guitar
- James Blanck - drums

== Discography ==
- Pilfers (cassette demo) (1997)
- Pilfers (1998)
- Chawalaleng (1999) (Mojo Records)
- Pilfers (2012, vinyl reissue) (Asbestos Records)
- From Far (2015)

== Critical reception ==
Writing for AllMusic Curtis Zimmermann described the 1998 debut, Pilfers, as "... an intense hybrid of ska, hardcore, and hip-hop that comes out sounding drastically different from many of the groups contemporaries ..." and as a "ground-breaking album" for the genre.
