= Luis Beza =

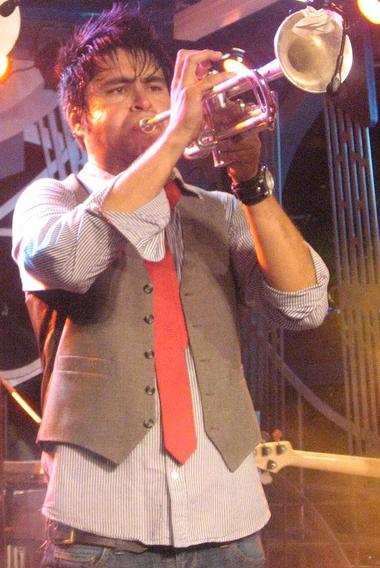
- Beza performing at Disneyland's Tomorrowland Terrace in August 2007.

Background information
- Born: January 2, 1985 (age 40); Santa Ana, California, United States
- Genres: Funk, disco, pop, third wave ska, hip hop
- Instrument: Trumpet
- Years active: 2005–2009

Luis Beza (born January 2, 1985, in Santa Ana, California) was the trumpet player for third-wave ska band Suburban Legends. He joined the band in Summer 2005 after the departure of Aaron Bertram, replacing him on trumpet. In July 2005 Luis started a hip-hop side-project called Lyricle Miracle with fellow Suburban Legends band member Derek Lee Rock and Jack Bartlett. He is American born and is of both Salvadoran and Guatemalan ancestry.

As of April 2009 Luis had quit Suburban Legends, saying "...it was just time to move on." He's now doing studio work, on tracks with such acts as MC Lars, Patent Pending, and Dusty Rhodes and The River Band.
