= Big D and the Kids Table =

American ska punk band

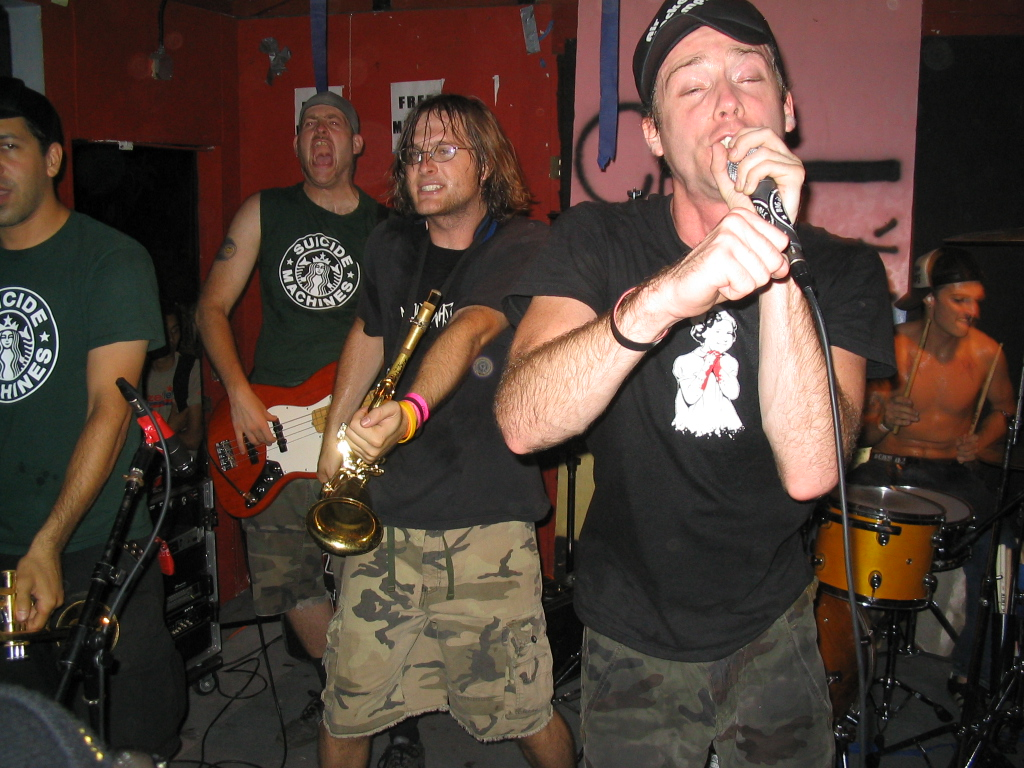
- Big D and The Kids Table performing in San Diego circa 2004

Background information
- Origin: Boston, Massachusetts, United States
- Genres: Ska punk, reggae, dub
- Years active: 1995–present
- Labels: Fork in Hand, Asian Man, Household Name, Springman, Bad News, SideOneDummy, Stomp
- Members: David McWane; Ryan O'Connor; Alex Brander; Alex Stern; Ben Basile; Logan La Barbera; Casey Gruttadauria; Paul Cuttler; Matt Appleton; Jonathan Degen
- Past members: Derek Davis; Steve Foote; Sean P. Rogan; Dan Stoppelman; Jon Riley; Marc Flynn; Chris Bush; Jon Lammi; Gabe Feenberg; Jason Gilbert; David Lagueux; Max MacVeety; Chris Sallen; Brian Klemm; Nick Pantazi; Lee Hartney; Chris Lucca; Matt Pick; Thomas Mann

Big D and the Kids Table is a ska punk band formed in October 1995 in Boston, Massachusetts, when its members converged in college. Their first release was on their own Fork in Hand Records label, but have since teamed with Springman Records and SideOneDummy. The band has been noted for its strict DIY work ethic, such as engineering, producing, and releasing their own albums and videos and self-promotion of their own shows.

The band released Good Luck in 1999 on Asian Man Records and quickly gained a large underground audience. The album featured a 10 piece band, including six horn players. The album is characterized and widely liked due to its catchy horn melodies, along with its fun and energetic nature. In 2000 the band recorded a gangsta rap album, Porch Life, and distributed it unofficially via cassette tape. In 2003 the album was officially released on CD through Fork in Hand. They have also recorded splits with Melt-Banana, Brain Failure, and Drexel. In 2002, they released The Gipsy Hill LP, a collection of some of their thrash material, as well as their covers of "Wailing Paddle" by the Rudiments and "New England" by Jonathan Richman. This album featured what is considered to be the "classic" Big D lineup, which featured long-time members such as Sean P. Rogan, David McWane, Steve Foote, Chris Bush, Paul Cuttler and Dan Stoppelman. This lineup was also featured on How it Goes, which was released in 2004, as well as Strictly Rude in 2007 and Fluent in Stroll in 2009. In 2005, long-time saxophonist Chris Bush left the band to move to Denver, Colorado (and eventually to Hawaii) and was replaced by Ryan O'Connor, who has remained in the band since. O'Connor's first appearance on a Big D record was for their 2007 release Strictly Rude.

Big D and the Kids Table played 200 shows a year around this time on average, in support of bands including the Mighty Mighty Bosstones, Dropkick Murphys, Rancid, and Alexisonfire, and have become regular performers on the Warped Tour. The band has also performed in the Summer of Ska Tour 2012 and the Ska Is Dead tour.

In the fall and winter of 2007 the band embarked on their first-ever large scale headlining tour, The Steady Riot Tour, named after the 2007 release.

== Name origin ==
Different stories exist about the band name's origin, especially about running over pets named Big D. However, lead singer Dave McWane has said that the band actually got their name when a friend, Conor Donnelly, told him that if he ever started a band he should call it Big D and the Kids Table, so he did.

== Band history ==
=== Early years (1995–1998) ===
Big D and the Kids Table was founded in 1995, when members converged at Berklee College of Music in Boston. Despite a frequently revolving lineup, the band built up a large local following almost immediately, packing clubs, halls, dorms, and basements in and around Boston. The band formed their own label, Fork in Hand Records, to put out their first album, Shot By Lammi, a split with Boston punk band Drexel, a side project of several Big D members (under assumed names). Soon, their label was releasing albums by a stable of Boston-area bands, building a vibrant punk/ska scene around them. Following Shot By Lammi, the band released a Live EP, recorded in the Bentley University cafeteria. Early on, they also began their tradition of holding an annual Halloween concert at home in Boston.

=== Good Luck, How it Goes, Strictly Rude (1999–2009) ===
In 1999, Big D signed on to Mike Park's Asian Man Records and released their first full-length album, Good Luck. Big D picked up the award for Outstanding Ska Band at the 1999 Boston Music Awards. The band returned in 2002 with The Gipsy Hill EP and continued with their busy show schedule (playing an average of 200 shows a year), as a split EP with Japanese noise rock act Melt Banana appeared in 2003. Also in 2003, the band released a gangsta rap album of their songs recorded in 2000 on their own Fork in Hand Records. Fueled by a DIY work ethic since early on, the band's small fan base kept growing through touring and promotion, all with little label support and money. Big D performed on several dates of that summer's Warped Tour and also played at Vegas' Ska Summit.

In 2004, the band signed to Springman Records and released How It Goes. They headed out across North America in 2004 on the Ska Is Dead tour with Catch 22, Mustard Plug, and the Planet Smashers. Following the release of How It Goes, Big D released several music video variations of their cover of The Specials' "Little Bitch," taking place in Montreal, St. Pete, and on Warped Tour. While continuing to tour with bands such as Suicide Machines, Reel Big Fish, and Streetlight Manifesto, the band released a limited edition EP titled Salem Girls for Halloween 2005. This was the first recording featuring new drummer Jon Reilly. Also in 2005, "You Lost, You're Crazy" from How It Goes appeared on the Warped Tour 2005 Tour Compilation as Big D toured with Warped Tour again.

In March 2007, Big D released Strictly Rude and proceeded to tour with Anti-Flag, Alexisonfire and Set Your Goals in the Spring of 2007. That summer they were on the Vans Warped Tour and followed it with a fall US headlining tour. In the summer of 2008 they were a part of the Shout It Loud tour along with Less Than Jake, Goldfinger, Suburban Legends and Westbound Train. In early 2009, they took part in a short east coast tour with The English Beat.

=== Fluent in Stroll, and for the Damned, The Dumb and the Delirious (2010–2012) ===
Fluent in Stroll was released by the band on July 7, 2009. They spent the summer promoting the album playing the entire 2009 Warped Tour. Shortly after this release, trombonist Paul Cuttler ceased touring with the band to spend more time with his family at home. He still appears live occasionally at local Big D shows, as well on their past few records.

Following the conclusion of the Warped Tour, they embarked on their 2nd headlining tour, which took place throughout the fall of 2009, called the "Not Fucking Around tour." It was named after the track on the new album (in the same way "the Steady Riot tour" supported Strictly Rude). illScarlett served as direct support for the majority of the tour.

Sean P. Rogan departed the band in 2009. After Rogan's departure Suburban Legends' Brian Klemm filled in as touring guitarist through 2010. Then in 2011, Nick Pantazi from the seminal Boston ska band Big Lick joined Big D on Guitar, until leaving in 2013 and was replaced by Alex Stern of Boston band The Pomps. Chris Lucca of Suburban Legends joined the band on trumpet around this time, but also left the band in 2013. His role was temporarily filled by Billy Kottage, who joined Reel Big Fish shortly after his tenure with Big D. Billy Kottage was later replaced by Logan La Barbera, who has remained with the band since.

On June 25, 2010, Big D played the Carson, California stop on Warped Tour. This was the only stop on the tour the band would go on to play that year. In an interview done on the same day for thepunksite.com, McWane stated that the band is set to release their next studio album entitled, "The Damned, The Dumb and the Delirious" in 2011. On January 5, 2011, the band announced on their Facebook page they would be playing the entire 2011 Vans Warped Tour.

In late November 2011, the band announced they were cancelling the remainder of their European tour in support of for the Damned, following lead singer Dave McWane's diagnosis with thyroid cancer. After surgery and radiation, McWane was declared cancer free, and the band went back on tour in April 2012.

=== Stomp / Stroll and Do Your Art (2013–present) ===
In early February 2013, it was announced that the band's next release would be two separate records, one ska/punk album, and another reggae/stroll/dub record. Stomp and Stroll released on June 11, 2013. This album featured new guitarist Alex Stern, bassist Steve Foote, drummer Derek Davis, long-time saxophonist Ryan O'Connor, former trumpeter Dan Stoppelman, former trombonist Paul Cuttler, former vocalist and trombonist Marc Flynn, Logan La Barbera on Trombone, among others. Shortly after this release, Steve Foote was replaced by bassist Ben Basile, leaving vocalist David McWane as the only remaining original Big D member.

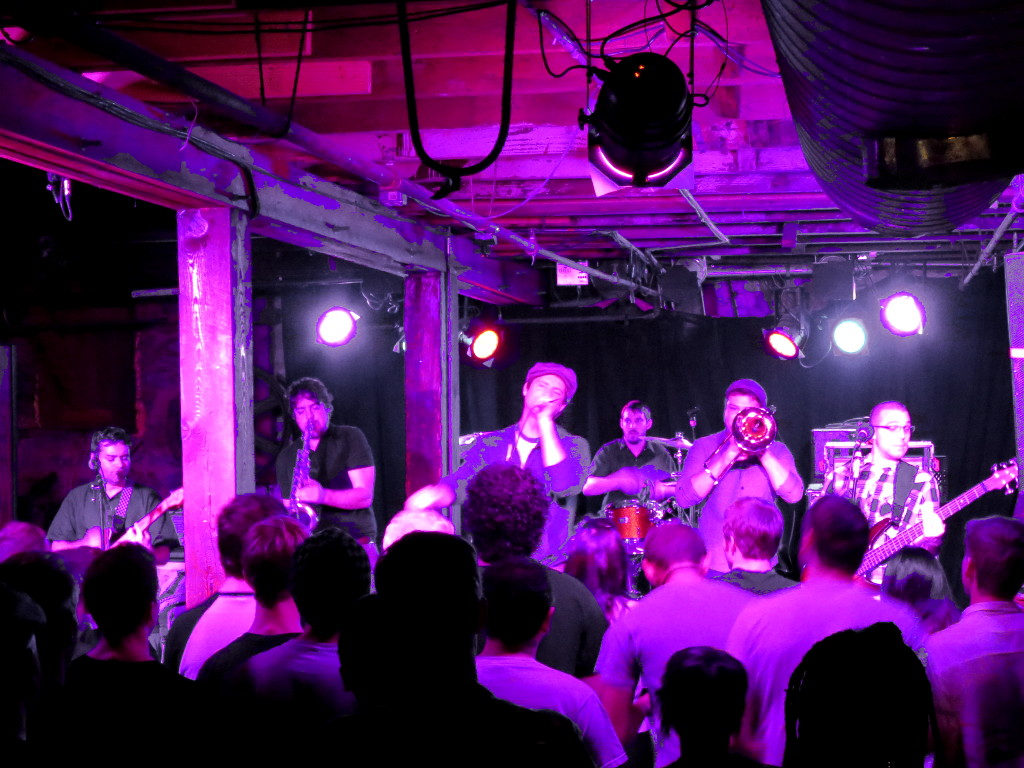
Big D and the Kids Table performing in The Masquerade, Atlanta - 2013.10.29

In 2014, the band performed "Good Luck" in its entirety, which featured several of the original members of the band returning to the stage for the first time in over a decade, including Marc Flynn. In 2014 and once again in 2015, Chris Bush appeared live with the band for the first time since his departure in 2005. In September 2015, it was reported that the band would be providing theme music for an American-produced animated special featuring Domo, the mascot of Japanese public broadcaster NHK, titled Domo Rock!, starring veteran actor George Takei.

The band continues to tour semi-frequently. Trombonist Logan La Barbera, formerly of The Flaming Tsunamis and Royal City Riot joined the band in 2013 after Billy Kottage played with Big D on trombone periodically throughout 2013 before joining Reel Big Fish. Saxophonist Jonathan Degen, formerly of Royal City Riot, joined Big D in 2015 as well while O'Connor was absent from tours and shows and Degen has played with the band ever since. Their live shows near Boston sometimes feature former touring and recording members such as trumpet player Dan Stoppelman, bassist Steve Foote, guitarist Sean P. Rogan, and most frequently, trombonist Paul Cuttler, among others. In 2017, drummer Derek Davis left the band to do guitar/drum tech for bands like Joan Jett and the Blackhearts and The Dropkick Murphys. Derek Davis was replaced by Alex Brander. Some of their live performances and occasionally their tours feature the "Doped Up Dollies" singers.

On October 22, 2021, SideOneDummy released the band's first new studio album of all original material in eight years, titled Do Your Art. The 20-song album was recorded in early 2021 and produced by Matt Appleton of Reel Big Fish, the Inevitables, and Goldfinger. The first single off this record, "Too Much," was released with an accompanying music video on July 16, 2021.

== Members ==
- David McWane – vocals, melodica, guitar (1995–present)
- Ryan O'Connor – tenor saxophone (2005–present)
- Alex Stern – guitar (2013–present), organ (2011–2012)
- Ben Basile – bass (2013–present)
- Logan La Barbera – trombone (2013–present)
- Paul Cuttler – trombone (2000–present)
- Alex Brander – drums (2017–present)
- Casey Gruttadauria – keyboards (2014–present)
- Matt Appleton- tenor saxophone, baritone saxophone, trumpet (2021-present)
- Jonathan Degen – tenor saxophone, baritone saxophone (2015–present)
- Sirae Richardson – backing vocals (2009–present)
- Brianne McWane – backing vocals (2010–present)
- Erin MacKenzie – backing vocals (2010–present)

=== Former members ===
- Sean P. Rogan – guitar, keys (1995–2009)
- Steve Foote – bass, ukulele (1995–2013)
- Dan Stoppelman – trumpet (1995–2010)
- Chris Bush – tenor saxophone (1995–2005)
- Gabe Feenberg – trombone (1995–2000)
- Marc 'The Skipper' Flynn – vocals, trumpet, valve trombone (1995–2001)
- Max MacVeety – drums (1995–2000, six shows in February 2009)
- Chris Sallen – tenor saxophone (1995–2000)
- Aaron Sinclair – guitar (1995–1998)
- Jon Lammi – guitar (1998–2000)
- Jason Gilbert – drums (2001–2004)
- Jon Reilly – drums (2004–2009)
- Brian Klemm – guitar (2009–2010)
- Hayley Jane – backing vocals (2009–2011)
- Nick Pantazi – guitar (2010–2013)
- Chris Lucca – trumpet (2010–2013)
- Billy Kottage – trombone (2013)
- Derek Davis – drums (2009–2017)
- David Lagueux – drums

== Discography ==
=== Studio albums ===
- Good Luck (1999, Asian Man Records)
- The Gipsy Hill (2002, Household Name Records)
- Porch Life (2003, Fork In Hand Records)
- How It Goes (2004, Springman Records)
- Strictly Rude (2007, SideOneDummy Records)
- Fluent in Stroll (2009, SideOneDummy Records)
- For the Damned, the Dumb & the Delirious (2011, SideOneDummy Records)
- Stomp (2013, Strictly Rude Records)
- Stroll (2013, Strictly Rude Records)
- Strictly Covered (2019, Strictly Rude Records)
- Do Your Art (2021, SideOneDummy Records)
- The Good Ole American Saturday Night (2026, SideOneDummy Records)

=== EPs ===
- Live EP (1998, Fork in Hand Records)
  1. "Introduction"
  2. "Fatman"
  3. "Draw the Line"
  4. "Hey"
  5. "Tommy"
  6. "51 Gardner"
- The Gipsy Hill EP (2002, Fork in Hand Records)
- Salem Girls (2005, Springman Records)
  1. "Salem Girls"
  2. "She's Lovely"
  3. "Oo Ie Yah"
  4. "Baby Don't Cry"
  5. "Salem Girls" [Dub Remix] Hidden Track
  6. "She's Lovely" [Stripped Down] Hidden Track
  7. "Salem Girls" [Instrumental] Hidden Track
  8. "(Untitled)" Hidden Track
- Noise Complaint EP (2007, SideOneDummy Records) iTunes Only Exclusive
  1. "Noise Complaint"
  2. "Shining On"
  3. "Halfway Home"
- Wicked Hardcore Christmas (2009, Springman Records)
  1. "Wicked Hardcore Christmas"
  2. "Wicked Hip-Hop Christmas"
  3. "Wicked House Christmas"
  4. "Wicked Hallicinogenic Christmas"
  5. "Wicked Hip-Hop Christmas" [clean version]
- 2 Songs 1 Download (2010, SideOneDummy Records)
  1. "Lash Out" (1:29)
  2. "Not Our Fault" (1:44)

=== Splits ===
- Split 7" with Lounge (1997, Montalban Hotel)
- Shot By Lammi (Split with Drexel) (1997, Fork in Hand Records)
- Look What You've Done (Split with Five Knuckle) (2003, Household Name Records)
- Split 7" with Melt Banana (2003, Fork in Hand Records)
- Beijing to Boston (Split with Brain Failure) (2007, Bad News Records)
- Ska is Dead 7" Club (Split with Brunt of It) (2012, Asbestos Records)
- Oi DJ (Split with Doped Up Dollies) (2015, Strictly Rude Records)

=== Music videos ===
- "Jeremy" (1997)
- "The Difference" (2002)
- "L.A. X" (2004)
- "My Girlfriend's on Drugs" (2004)
- "Little Bitch" (2005)
- "Noise Complaint" (2007)
- "Shining On" (2007)
- "Have Yourself a Wicked Hardcore Christmas" (2007)
- "Fluent in Stroll" (2009)
- 'We Can Live Anywhere" (2010)
- "It's Raining Zombies on Wall St." (2011)
- "Flashlight" (2012)
- "One Day" (2012)
- "Too Much" (2021)

=== Compilation albums ===
- Built Up From Nothing: The D-Sides and Strictly Dub (2012, SideOneDummy Records)

=== Remix albums ===
- Strictly Mixed and Mashed (remix album with dj BC) (2008, Fork in Hand Records)
- Rude Remix Revolution (remix album with various artists) (2009, Silver Sprocket)

=== Compilation appearances ===
- The Best Bands You'll Ever Hate (1996, Asbestos Records)
- Skarmageddon 3 (1997, Moon Ska Records)
- Mailorder is Still Fun!! (1999, Asian Man Records)
- Culture Shock Punk Rock (2000, Tomato Head)
- Club Zed (2001, Headcore Records)
- Music That Won't Swallow' (2001, SuperToad Records)
- A Far Away Place (2002, Robot Racket Records)
- The Giant Rock 'N' Roll Swindle (2002, Fork in Hand Records)
- Punk Ass Generosity Vol. 2 (2003, Devil Doll)
- The Rocky Horror Punk Rock Show (2003, Springman Records)
- State of the Union Volume 2 (2003, Union Label Group)
- Danger Zone Records Presents: A Call for the Underground (2004, Danger Zone Records)
- 2005 Warped Tour Compilation (2005, SideOneDummy Records)
- Pucknation Dot Com: The Album II (2006, Little Heart Records)
- Shine Some Light: A Benefit for Dan Lang-Gunn (2006, Asbestos Records)
- Ska is Dead (2007, Asian Man Records)
- Plea For Peace Vol. 2 (2007, Asian Man Records)
- 2007 Warped Tour Compilation (2007, SideOneDummy Records)
- 2009 Warped Tour Compilation (2009, SideOneDummy Records)
- This Is New England: A 100% Benefit Comp (2013, Punk Rock Pravda)
