= Brian Klemm =

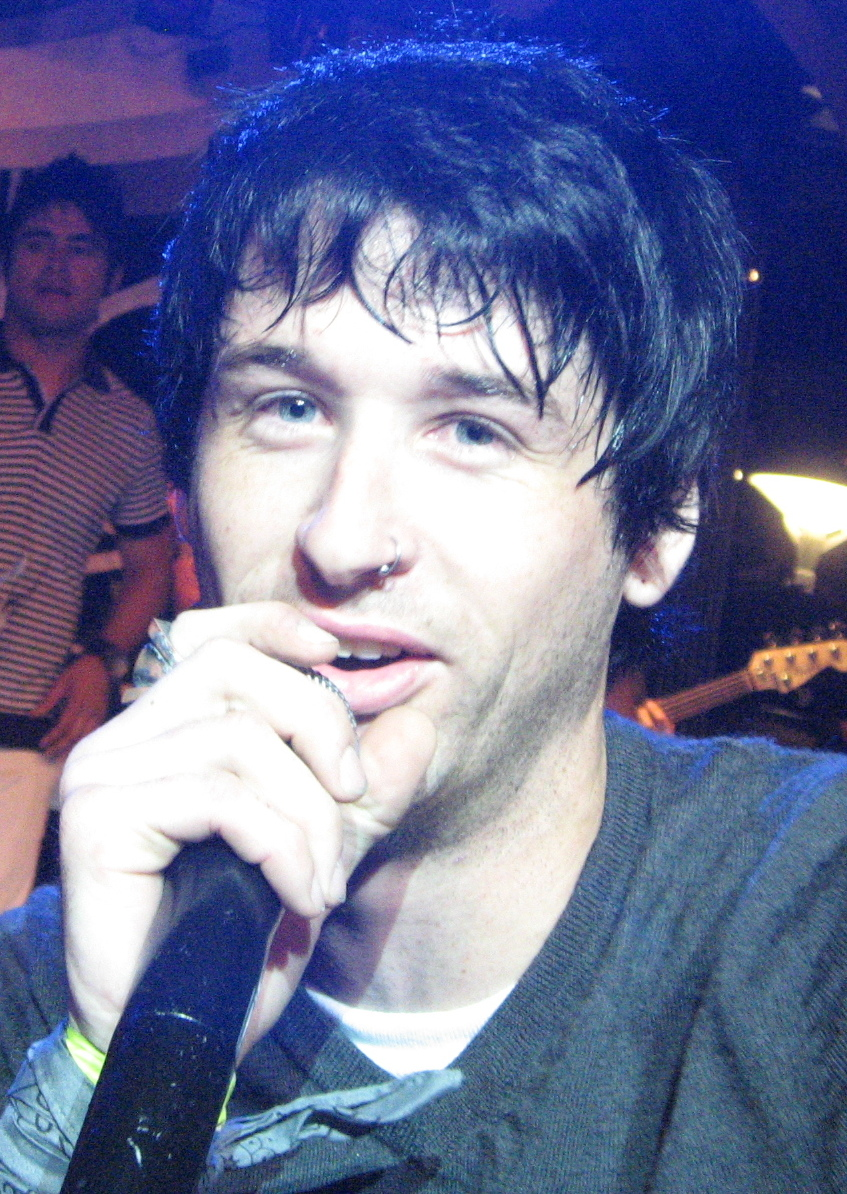
- Klemm in 2007

Background information
- Born: May 21, 1982 (age 44)
- Genres: Third wave ska, funk, disco, Pop
- Instruments: Guitar, Vocals
- Years active: 1999–present

Brian Wayne Klemm (born May 21, 1982) is an American musician, best known as the guitarist for Orange County-based third-wave ska band Suburban Legends. He joined Suburban Legends in 1999, shortly before the release of Origin Edition, although he did not play guitar on the album. Klemm also briefly joined Big D and the Kids Table in 2009 as their touring guitarist until 2010. Klemm also occasionally performs with Reel Big Fish.

He also lends his voice to both versions of the song "Desperate", "This Cherry", "Powerful Game", "So Fine", and "Your Girlfriend's Pretty." He also sings live covers of Frankie Valli's "Can't Take My Eyes Off You" and Elvis Presley's "Rubberneckin'".

Klemm is based in Huntington Beach.

== Other work ==
- On Reel Big Fish's Monkeys for Nothin' and the Chimps for Free, Brian performed one half of the guitar solo fight on "I'm Her Man" and provided additional cursing on "Another F.U. Song." He also appears on the cover of Reel Big Fish's 2009 album, Fame, Fortune and Fornication, in the same hair metal costume he wore for the cover of Suburban Legends' Let's Be Friends. Klemm provides backup vocals on "Your Girlfriend Sucks", from Reel Big Fish's 2012 album, Candy Coated Fury.
- Though Nick Pantazi took over guitar duties before the recording of Big D and the Kids Table's 2011 album, For the Damned, the Dumb & the Delirious, Klemm received writing credit on the track "Clothes Off". Several years before his stint in Big D, along with Vince Walker, he made an appearance in one of the many music videos for Big D and the Kids Table's cover of The Specials' song "Little Bitch".
- Klemm, along with Vincent Walker, make an appearance on Uh Oh! Explosion's second album For The Win!, Track 4, titled "Five Finger Discount", & Track 11, titled "Be Like The Anti-Christ" - (Klemm-O-Tronic Guitar Solo Only).
- Klemm also tours with Dave Wakeling's lineup of Two Tone band The Beat on their UK shows.
