= Western Carolina University Pride of the Mountains Marching Band =

College marching band in Cullowhee, North Carolina

Coordinates: 35°18′39.60″N 83°11′02.40″W

Pride of the Mountains Marching Band
- School: Western Carolina University
- Location: Cullowhee, North Carolina, U.S.
- Conference: Southern Conference
- Founded: 1938
- Director: Matt Henley
- Members: 450 (Fall 2025)
- Website: http://www.prideofthemountains.com/

The Pride of the Mountains Marching Band is the marching band which represents Western Carolina University. The band performs pre-game, halftime, and post-game shows at all Catamounts Football home games and routinely provides exhibition performances throughout the Southeast. Unlike most college marching bands, the Pride of the Mountains designs, creates, and performs one perfected halftime show other than doing different performances every week.

== History ==
The Pride of the Mountains Marching Band was founded in 1938 and had just 23 students. By 1991, the band had 88 total members, including 18 dancers. Since that time, the band has experienced a steady growth to its present membership level of over 400 members. Today, the marching band is open to all Western Carolina University, Southwestern Community College, and Haywood Community College students, regardless of class or major, with approximately 60% of its members being non-music majors.

== Recent honors ==
=== BOA Grand Nationals ===
In 1998, 2003, 2008, 2012, 2015, and 2022, the Pride of the Mountains were invited to travel to Indianapolis, Indiana to put on an exhibition performance at the Bands of America (BOA) Grand National Championships in Lucas Oil Stadium.

=== Sudler Trophy ===
The Pride of the Mountains won the Sudler Trophy in 2009. This award is given to a marching band which has exhibited continued success for many years, and is often referred to as the "Heisman Trophy of collegiate marching bands". Western Carolina is the only institution in the state of North Carolina and the first member of the Southern Conference (SoCon) to be selected for this prestigious award.

=== Tournament of Roses Parade ===
In 2011, the Pride of the Mountains were invited to participate in the Rose Bowl Parade in Pasadena, California. The band was given national attention for both their performance in the parade as well as their performance at the annual BandFest, during which they performed their halftime show. They were voted as the best band in the 2011 Rose Parade poll created by KTLA.

=== Macy's Thanksgiving Day Parade ===
In 2014, the Pride of the Mountains performed in the Macy's Thanksgiving Day Parade in New York City. The band performed with 510 members participating, and announcers applauded their performance, saying "This is the largest band this parade has seen in decades", "This is the best of the best", and "They don't mess around at Western Carolina".

In 2019, the Pride of the Mountains performed in the Macy's Thanksgiving Day Parade again.

=== St. Patrick's Day Parade ===
In 2024, the Pride of the Mountains performed in the St. Patrick's Day Parade in Dublin, Ireland. The band was one of two U.S. Collegiate Bands selected to perform in the historic parade. The band was given international attention for their performance in the parade. The band also performed at the Kilkenny Castle earlier that week.

== Pep bands ==
The "Cathouse Band" pep band plays at home basketball games during basketball season. The band, with over 100 members, plays at both men's and women's basketball games and is open to join by all students at WCU, SWCC, and HCC. The pep band travels with the WCU basketball teams to the SoCon Tournament and the NCAA Tournament.

"Purple Thunder" is an indoor drumline that performs during halftime at select home basketball games. The group is chosen through an audition process. In addition to the drums, the group also includes the WCU Cheer and Dance Teams, as well as an electronic sound system that provides a backing track of pop music that accompanies the drumline. The group made their debut performance in the spring of 2008.

== Traditions ==
=== March to the stadium ===
Approximately one hour prior to the start of home Catamount Football games, the Pride lines up for their march to the stadium. The band lines up in the street between “The Rocks” resident halls and the dining hall and marches down the road past the Fine and Performing Arts Center and halts in front of the stadium to perform the fight song for the crowd of tailgating fans.

=== Singing the alma mater ===
The singing of the Alma Mater occurs during the pregame show. It is sung right before the band plays the National Anthem, which marks the beginning of their "spirit sequence", in which the band spells out different variations of the university's mascot. The Alma Mater is also sung after the band's post game performance.

== Tournament of Champions ==
The Pride of the Mountain's Tournament of Champions (TOC) is an annual invitational marching band competition, to which the Pride invites 25 of the Southeast's top high school marching bands to WCU's Cullowhee campus. This event attracts nearly 10,000 musicians and spectators each year. The Pride of the Mountains also perform twice at the TOC.

== Other ensembles ==
- Wind Ensemble - Directed by Dr. Margaret Underwood, this auditioned ensemble of 40-50 musicians performs a challenging repertory that includes standard literature, contemporary works, and premieres of commissioned works. This group meets every semester.
- Jazz Band - Directed by jazz pianist & composer Pavel Wlosok, this auditioned group performs jazz standards and new works for jazz band. This ensemble meets every semester.
- Symphonic Band - This auditioned ensemble of 50-60 musicians, directed by Mr. Tim Wise, performs a repertory of both standard and contemporary works. This ensemble meets every semester.
- Concert Band - Directed by Mr. Dillon Ingle, this ensemble of 60-70 musicians serves as both an auditioned ensemble for music majors and an audition free ensemble for non-majors and performs literature of the medium to medium advanced category. This group meets in only the Spring semester.
- Civic Orchestra - A college and community chamber orchestra, led by Dr. Damon Sink.
- Percussion Ensemble - Led by Dr. Amy Xin Yin, this 4-21 piece group performs challenging works for various combinations of percussion instruments. The WCU Marching Band also has a front ensemble.
- Studio Ensembles - Most of the woodwind and brass studios at WCU offer small ensembles of like instruments that are conducted or coached by the studio professor. These include the Tuba and Euphonium Ensemble, Trumpet Ensemble, Trombone Choir, and Saxophone Quartet.
- Concert Choir - Directed by Dr. Allison Thorp, this ensemble features around 20 to 30 auditioned musicians who perform a challenging and diverse repertory of choral music.
- Catamount Singers & Electric Soul - This vocal ensemble performs popular music combined with choreography. This group includes a full rhythm and horn section called Electric Soul. It is the primary ensemble of the Commercial & Electronic music program at WCU.

== Service organizations ==
- Phi Mu Alpha Sinfonia
- Kappa Kappa Psi
- Sigma Alpha Iota

Preceded by Indiana University	Sudler Trophy Recipient; 2009	Succeeded by University of Notre Dame
