= List of 2013 albums =

The following is a list of albums, EPs, and mixtapes released in 2013. These albums are (1) original, i.e. excluding reissues, remasters, and compilations of previously released recordings, and (2) notable, defined as having received significant coverage from reliable sources independent of the subject.

For additional information about bands formed, reformed, or disbanded, for deaths of musicians, and for links to musical awards, see 2013 in music.

== First quarter ==
=== January ===
List of albums released in January 2013
Go to: January | February | March | April | May | June | July | August | September | October | November | December | Back to top
Release date	Artist	Album	Genre	Label	Ref.
January 1	Girls' Generation	I Got a Boy	K-pop	SM	
January 2	Skrillex	Leaving	Electronic, dubstep, garage	Owsla	
January 7	Pere Ubu	Lady from Shanghai	Art rock	Fire	
January 8	Black Veil Brides	Wretched and Divine: The Story of the Wild Ones	Glam metal, hard rock	Lava, Universal Republic	
January 8	Dropkick Murphys	Signed and Sealed in Blood	Celtic punk	Born & Bred	
January 8	Hollywood Undead	Notes from the Underground	Rap rock, alternative rock, alternative hip-hop	A&M Octone	
January 8	Twenty One Pilots	Vessel	Electropop, indie pop, rap rock	Fueled by Ramen	
January 11	New Order	Lost Sirens		Rhino	
January 11	Villagers	Awayland	Indie folk	Domino	
January 13	Tiny Moving Parts	This Couch is Long & Full of Friendship		Kind of Like Records	
January 14	Everything Everything	Arc	Art rock, indie rock	RCA, Sony Music	
January 14	Dutch Uncles	Out of Touch in the Wild	Indie rock, indie pop	Memphis Industries	
January 15	ASAP Rocky	Long. Live. ASAP	Hip-hop	ASAP Worldwide, Polo Grounds Music, RCA	
January 15	Free Energy	Love Sign	Pop, rock	Free Energy	
January 15	Yo La Tengo	Fade	Indie rock	Matador	
January 16	Sarah Brightman	Dreamchaser	Classical crossover	Simha LLC	
January 16	Toro y Moi	Anything in Return	Synth-pop, indie pop, house	Carpark	
January 18	Helloween	Straight Out of Hell	Power metal	The End	
January 21	Adam Ant	Adam Ant Is the Blueblack Hussar in Marrying the Gunner's Daughter	Rock, pop rock, post-punk	Blueblack Hussar	
January 21	The Blackout	Start the Party	Post-hardcore, hard rock	Cooking Vinyl	
January 21	I Am Kloot	Let It All In		Shepherd Moon LLP	
January 21	The Joy Formidable	Wolf's Law	Alternative rock, dream pop	Atlantic	
January 21	Ludovico Einaudi	In a Time Lapse	Contemporary classical	Decca	
January 22	Aaron Neville	My True Story	R&B, soul	Blue Note	
January 22	Bad Religion	True North	Punk rock, melodic hardcore	Epitaph	
January 22	Casting Crowns	The Acoustic Sessions: Volume One	Acoustic, worship	Beach Street, Reunion	
January 22	Classified	Classified	Hip-hop	Halflife Records, Universal Music Canada	
January 22	Fidlar	Fidlar	Skate punk, garage punk, surf punk	Mom + Pop, Wichita, Dine Alone	
January 22	Foxygen	We Are the 21st Century Ambassadors of Peace & Magic	Pop, psychedelic rock	Jagjaguwar	
January 22	Gary Allan	Set You Free	Country	MCA Nashville	
January 22	Nosaj Thing	Home	Electronic music, instrumental hip-hop	Innovative Leisure, Timetable	
January 22	Otep	Hydra	Alternative metal, nu metal	Victory	
January 22	Ra Ra Riot	Beta Love	Indie rock, indie pop, electronica	Barsuk	
January 22	Trapt	Reborn	Alternative rock, alternative metal, post-grunge	EMI	
January 22	Voivod	Target Earth	Progressive metal, thrash metal	Century Media	
January 25	Blue	Roulette	Pop, R&B, electropop	Island, Blueworld Records	
January 28	Biffy Clyro	Opposites	Alternative rock	14th Floor	
January 28	Delphic	Collections	Alternative dance	Polydor	
January 28	Funeral for a Friend	Conduit	Post-hardcore, melodic hardcore	Distiller Records, The End	
January 28	Le1f	Fly Zone	Hip-hop	Greedhead, Camp & Street	
January 28	Pusha T	Wrath of Caine	Hip-hop	GOOD Music	
January 29	Adam Green & Binki Shapiro	Adam Green & Binki Shapiro		Rounder	
January 29	Andrea Bocelli	Passione	Pop, traditional pop, Latin	Verve, Decca, Sugar Music	
January 29	Ben Harper and Charlie Musselwhite	Get Up!	Blues rock	Stax	
January 29	Cakes da Killa	The Eulogy		Mishka NYC	
January 29	Colton Dixon	A Messenger	CCM, rock	Sparrow, 19	
January 29	Frontier Ruckus	Eternity of Dimming	Folk rock	Quite Scientific Records, Loose Music	
January 29	Jill Barber	Chansons	Jazz, pop	Outside Music	
January 29	Justin Bieber	Believe Acoustic	Pop	Schoolboy, RBMG, Island	
January 29	k-os	Black on Blonde	Alternative hip-hop, rock	Crown Loyalist, EMI	
January 29	Local Natives	Hummingbird	Indie rock	Infectious, Frenchkiss	
January 29	Tegan and Sara	Heartthrob	Synth-pop	Vapor, Warner Bros.	
January 29	Tomahawk	Oddfellows	Hard rock	Ipecac	
January 30	Kitty	D.A.I.S.Y. Rage	Cloud rap		

=== February ===
List of albums released in February 2013
Go to: January | February | March | April | May | June | July | August | September | October | November | December | Back to top
Release date	Artist	Album	Genre	Label	Ref.
February 1	The Underachievers	Indigoism	Hip-hop	Brainfeeder	
February 2	My Bloody Valentine	m b v	Noise pop, shoegaze	m b v	
February 4	Courteeners	Anna	Indie rock	PIAS Cooperative	
February 4	Eels	Wonderful, Glorious	Indie rock	Vagrant	
February 4	Frightened Rabbit	Pedestrian Verse	Indie rock	Atlantic	
February 4	Heaven's Basement	Filthy Empire	Hard rock	Red Bull	
February 4	Pure Love	Anthems	Alternative rock, garage rock, punk rock	Vertigo, Mercury	
February 5	The Bronx	The Bronx	Hardcore punk, hard rock	White Drugs, ATO	
February 5	Coheed and Cambria	The Afterman: Descension	Progressive rock, alternative rock	Hundred Handed/Everything Evil Inc.	
February 5	Hayden	Us Alone	Indie folk	Arts & Crafts	
February 5	Jim James	Regions of Light and Sound of God	Alternative rock, indie rock	ATO	
February 5	Joe Budden	No Love Lost	Hip-hop	E1, Mood Muzik	
February 5	Josh Groban	All That Echoes	Operatic pop, classical	Reprise	
February 5	King	We Are King	R&B, dream pop	King Creative	
February 5	Red	Release the Panic	Post-grunge, Christian metal	Essential, Sony Music	
February 5	Ron Sexsmith	Forever Endeavour	Rock	Cooking Vinyl	
February 5	Silverstein	This Is How the Wind Shifts	Post-hardcore, emo	Hopeless	
February 5	Tim McGraw	Two Lanes of Freedom	Country	Big Machine	
February 5	Unknown Mortal Orchestra	II	Indie rock, psychedelic rock	Jagjaguwar	
February 7	Autechre	Exai	Electronic	Warp	
February 8	Bullet for My Valentine	Temper Temper	Heavy metal, hard rock	RCA	
February 11	Darwin Deez	Songs for Imaginative People	Indie rock	Lucky Number Music	
February 11	Foals	Holy Fire	Indie rock, math rock	Transgressive	
February 11	Ocean Colour Scene	Painting	Alternative rock, indie rock	Cooking Vinyl	
February 12	Justin Rutledge	Valleyheart	Alternative country	Outside Music	
February 12	Lisa Germano	No Elephants		Badman Recording Co.	
February 12	Nataly Dawn	How I Knew Her	Folk, pop	Nonesuch	
February 12	Ras Kass	Barmageddon		Cre8yte Corporation	
February 12	Serengeti	Saal	Hip-hop	Graveface	
February 15	Apparat	Krieg und Frieden (Music for Theatre)	Electronic	Mute	
February 15	Lowrider	Black Stones		Illusive	
February 18	Dawn McCarthy and Bonnie "Prince" Billy	What the Brothers Sang		Drag City, Domino	
February 18	Girls Names	The New Life		Tough Love Records	
February 18	Nick Cave and the Bad Seeds	Push the Sky Away	Alternative rock	Bad Seed Ltd.	
February 19	Atlas Genius	When It Was Now	Indie rock, indietronica	Warner Bros.	
February 19	Buckcherry	Confessions	Hard rock	Century Media, Eleven Seven	
February 19	Czarface	Czarface	Hip-hop	Brick Records	
February 19	Iceage	You're Nothing	Hardcore punk, punk rock, garage rock	Matador	
February 19	Psychic Ills	One Track Mind		Sacred Bones	
February 19	Puscifer	Donkey Punch the Night	Alternative rock	Puscifer Entertainment	
February 19	Strfkr	Miracle Mile	Indie rock, synth-pop	Polyvinyl	
February 19	Wednesday 13	The Dixie Dead	Horror punk	Wednesday 13 LLC	
February 22	King Gizzard & the Lizard Wizard	Eyes Like the Sky	Garage rock	Flightless	
February 22	Stratovarius	Nemesis	Power metal, symphonic metal	Edel	
February 25	Atoms for Peace	Amok	Experimental rock, electronica	XL	
February 25	Darkthrone	The Underground Resistance	Heavy metal, speed metal, thrash metal	Peaceville	
February 25	Ed Harcourt	Back into the Woods	British rock	Piano Wolf Records, CCCLX	
February 25	Johnny Marr	The Messenger	Alternative rock	Warner Bros.	
February 25	Keaton Henson	Birthdays	Indie folk, slowcore	Anti–, Oak Ten Records	
February 25	Killah Priest	The Psychic World of Walter Reed	Hip-hop	Proverbs Records	
February 25	Ólafur Arnalds	For Now I Am Winter			
February 25	Palma Violets	180	Indie rock	Rough Trade	
February 25	Steven Wilson	The Raven That Refused to Sing (And Other Stories)	Progressive rock	Kscope	
February 26	Cappadonna	Eyrth, Wynd and Fyre	Hip-hop	RBC	
February 26	Emmylou Harris and Rodney Crowell	Old Yellow Moon	Country, folk	Nonesuch	
February 26	Ill Bill	The Grimy Awards	Hip-hop	Uncle Howie Records, Fat Beats Records	
February 26	The Mavericks	In Time	Americana, neotraditional country, Tex-Mex	Valory	
February 26	Tony Molina	Dissed and Dismissed	Power pop, indie rock	Melters	
February 27	Soilwork	The Living Infinite	Melodic death metal	Nuclear Blast	

=== March ===
List of albums released in March 2013
Go to: January | February | March | April | May | June | July | August | September | October | November | December | Back to top
Release date	Artist	Album	Genre	Label	Ref.
March 1	Lordi	To Beast or Not to Beast	Hard rock, heavy metal, shock rock	Sony Music, AFM, The End	
March 1	Rhye	Woman	Alternative R&B, downtempo, soul	Polydor	
March 1	Saxon	Sacrifice	Heavy metal	UDR	
March 4	Bastille	Bad Blood	Indie pop, indie rock, alternative rock	Virgin	
March 4	Charlotte Church	Two	Indie pop, alternative rock, gothic rock	Alligator Wine	
March 4	Dido	Girl Who Got Away	Electronic, pop, house	RCA	
March 4	Inna	Party Never Ends	EDM	Roton	
March 4	Kate Nash	Girl Talk	Indie rock	Have 10p Records, Fontana	
March 4	Stereophonics	Graffiti on the Train	Alternative rock, rock, pop rock	Ignition	
March 5	Ashley Monroe	Like a Rose	Neotraditional country	Warner Bros. Nashville	
March 5	Dirty South	Speed of Life	Electro house, progressive house	Phazing Records	
March 5	How to Destroy Angels	Welcome Oblivion	Post-industrial, electronica	Columbia	
March 5	Josh Ritter	The Beast in Its Tracks	Folk rock, Americana	Pytheas Recordings	
March 5	The Men	New Moon	Punk rock	Sacred Bones	
March 5	Robyn Hitchcock	Love from London	Folk-pop	Yep Roc	
March 5	Son Volt	Honky Tonk	Americana, alternative country	Rounder	
March 5	They Might Be Giants	Nanobots	Alternative rock, art pop	Idlewild, Lojinx	
March 5	Waxahatchee	Cerulean Salt	Indie rock, indie folk	Don Giovanni	
March 5	Youth Lagoon	Wondrous Bughouse	Art pop, neo-psychedelia	Fat Possum	
March 6	One Ok Rock	Jinsei×Boku=	Alternative rock, post-hardcore	A-Sketch	
March 8	Bon Jovi	What About Now	Soft rock	Island	
March 8	Bonnie Tyler	Rocks and Honey	Country, pop, rock	ZYX Music	
March 8	David Bowie	The Next Day	Art rock	ISO Records, Columbia	
March 8	Hurts	Exile	Synth-pop, electronic rock	Major Label	
March 11	John Grant	Pale Green Ghosts	Synth-pop, soft rock	Bella Union	
March 12	Audio Adrenaline	Kings & Queens	Christian contemporary, Christian alternative rock	Fair Trade	
March 12	Devendra Banhart	Mala	Indie folk, folk, Alternative rock	Nonesuch	
March 12	Eric Clapton	Old Sock	Blues, rock, blues rock	Surfdog, Duck Records, Polydor	
March 12	Fit for a King	Creation/Destruction	Metalcore	Solid State	
March 12	Mindless Behavior	All Around the World	R&B, pop, hip-hop	Streamline Records, Interscope	
March 12	Orianthi	Heaven in This Hell	Hard rock, blues rock, country rock	Robo Records	
March 14	Yelawolf	Trunk Muzik Returns	Alternative hip-hop, rap rock	Slumerican, Shady	
March 15	Clutch	Earth Rocker	Stoner rock, blues rock	Weathermaker Music	
March 15	Justin Timberlake	The 20/20 Experience	Neo soul, R&B	RCA	
March 15	Karl Bartos	Off the Record	Synth-pop	Bureau B	
March 18	Billy Bragg	Tooth & Nail	Country folk, Americana, alternative rock	Cooking Vinyl	
March 18	Black Rebel Motorcycle Club	Specter at the Feast	Indie rock, alternative rock	Abstract Dragon	
March 18	Daughter	If You Leave	Indie folk, shoegaze	4AD	
March 18	Davichi	Mystic Ballad	R&B	Core Contents Media	
March 18	Dear Reader	Rivonia	Folk-pop	City Slang	
March 18	Intronaut	Habitual Levitations (Instilling Words with Tones)	Progressive metal, post-metal	Century Media	
March 18	Suede	Bloodsports	Glam pop, alternative rock	Warner Bros.	
March 18	Woodkid	The Golden Age	Orchestral pop	Green United Music	
March 19	Anthrax	Anthems	Heavy metal, hard rock	Megaforce, Nuclear Blast	
March 19	Draco Rosa	Vida	Rock en español, Latin pop, alternative rock	Sony Music Latin	
March 19	Hope for the Dying	Aletheia	Christian metal	Facedown	
March 19	Julieta Venegas	Los Momentos	Electropop	Sony Music	
March 19	Kacey Musgraves	Same Trailer Different Park	Country	Mercury Nashville	
March 19	Low	The Invisible Way	Indie rock, slowcore	Sub Pop	
March 19	Marnie Stern	The Chronicles of Marnia	Experimental rock, indie rock	Kill Rock Stars	
March 19	The Ocean Blue	Ultramarine		Korda Records	
March 19	Phosphorescent	Muchacho		Dead Oceans	
March 19	Prurient	Through the Window	Techno, noise	Blackest Ever Black	
March 21	Infinite	New Challenge	K-pop	Woollim	
March 22	Depeche Mode	Delta Machine	Electropop	Columbia	
March 22	Lil Wayne	I Am Not a Human Being II	Hip-hop	Young Money, Cash Money, Republic	
March 22	Northlane	Singularity	Metalcore, progressive metal	UNFD	
March 25	Alizée	5		Sony Music	
March 25	The Color Morale	Know Hope	Post-hardcore, math rock, hardcore punk	Rise	
March 25	Edwyn Collins	Understated		AED Records	
March 25	Kvelertak	Meir	Hardcore punk	Sony Music, Roadrunner	
March 25	Lapalux	Nostalchic	Electronic	Brainfeeder	
March 25	Nadia Sirota	Baroque	Classical	Bedroom Community	
March 25	OneRepublic	Native	Pop rock, pop	Mosley, Interscope	
March 25	Peace	In Love	Indie rock, psychedelic rock, alternative rock	Columbia	
March 25	Wire	Change Becomes Us	Post-punk	Pink Flag	
March 26	Avantasia	The Mystery of Time	Symphonic metal, power metal	Nuclear Blast	
March 26	Blake Shelton	Based on a True Story...	Country	Warner Bros. Nashville	
March 26	Blu	York	Hip-hop, lo-fi	Sire, New World Color	
March 26	Cartel	Collider	Rock, pop rock		
March 26	Durag Dynasty	360 Waves	Hip-hop	Nature Sounds	
March 26	Senses Fail	Renacer	Melodic hardcore, metalcore, sludge metal	Staple Records	
March 26	Sevendust	Black Out the Sun	Alternative metal, nu metal	Asylum	
March 26	The Story So Far	What You Don't See	Pop-punk	Pure Noise	
March 26	The Strokes	Comedown Machine	Indie rock	RCA	
March 26	Stryper	Second Coming	Christian metal, heavy metal	Frontiers Music	
March 26	Suicidal Tendencies	13	Crossover thrash	Suicidal	
March 26	Wavves	Afraid of Heights	Alternative rock, indie rock, pop-punk	Ghost Ramp, Mom + Pop Music, Warner Bros.	
March 27	Ana Popović	Can You Stand the Heat	Blues, jazz, funk	ArtisteXclusive records	
March 27	Army of Lovers	Big Battle of Egos	Dance, pop	Sofo Records	
March 29	Carla Bruni	Little French Songs	Chanson	Teorema, Verve	

== Second quarter ==
=== April ===
List of albums released in April 2013
Go to: January | February | March | April | May | June | July | August | September | October | November | December | Back to top
Release date	Artist	Album	Genre	Label	Ref.
April 1	The Black Angels	Indigo Meadow	Psychedelic rock	Blue Horizon	
April 1	Bring Me the Horizon	Sempiternal	Metalcore, post-hardcore	RCA, Epitaph	
April 1	British Sea Power	Machineries of Joy	Alternative rock	Rough Trade	
April 1	The Flaming Lips	The Terror	Experimental rock	Warner Bros.	
April 1	Wiley	The Ascent	Hip-hop, dance, grime	Warner Music	
April 2	Alkaline Trio	My Shame Is True	Punk rock, pop-punk	Heart & Skull, Epitaph	
April 2	The Band Perry	Pioneer	Country	Republic Nashville	
April 2	The Besnard Lakes	Until in Excess, Imperceptible UFO	Indie rock	Jagjaguwar	
April 2	Charles Bradley	Victim of Love	Soul	Daptone, Dunham Records	
April 2	Cold War Kids	Dear Miss Lonelyhearts	Indie rock	Downtown, V2	
April 2	The Dear Hunter	Migrant	Indie rock, progressive rock	Equal Vision	
April 2	Jello Biafra and the Guantanamo School of Medicine	White People and the Damage Done	Hardcore punk	Alternative Tentacles	
April 2	Killswitch Engage	Disarm the Descent	Melodic metalcore	Roadrunner	
April 2	New Kids on the Block	10	Pop, dance-pop, pop rock	The Block/Boston Five, Columbia	
April 2	Tyler, the Creator	Wolf	Alternative hip-hop	Odd Future	
April 5	James Blake	Overgrown	R&B, electronic, soul	A&M, Polydor	
April 5	The Knife	Shaking the Habitual	Electronic	Rabid, Mute	
April 5	Orchestral Manoeuvres in the Dark	English Electric	Synth-pop	Sony BMG	
April 5	Paramore	Paramore	Rock, punk	Fueled by Ramen	
April 5	Terror	Live by the Code	Hardcore	Victory	
April 5	Volbeat	Outlaw Gentlemen & Shady Ladies	Hard rock	Vertigo	
April 8	Big Country	The Journey	Alternative rock, Celtic rock	Cherry Red	
April 8	Deez Nuts	Bout It!	Hardcore punk	Century Media, UNFD	
April 9	Brad Paisley	Wheelhouse	Country	Arista Nashville	
April 9	Dawes	Stories Don't End	Folk rock	HUB Records	
April 9	Device	Device	Hard rock, industrial metal	Warner Bros.	
April 9	Kurt Vile	Wakin on a Pretty Daze	Indie rock, psychedelic rock	Matador	
April 9	Stone Sour	House of Gold & Bones – Part 2	Alternative metal, hard rock	Roadrunner	
April 9	Tyga	Hotel California	Hip-hop	Young Money, Cash Money, Republic	
April 10	Big K.R.I.T.	King Remembered in Time	Hip-hop	Cinematic	
April 10	Bobby McFerrin	SpiritYouAll		Sony Masterworks	
April 10	Ghost	Infestissumam	Heavy metal, doom metal	Sonet, Loma Vista	
April 12	Angel	About Time	R&B, hip-hop, grime	Island, Republic, Universal	
April 12	Charli XCX	True Romance	Synth-pop, dark wave	Asylum, Atlantic	
April 12	Fall Out Boy	Save Rock and Roll	Pop rock	Island	
April 12	Kid Cudi	Indicud	Hip-hop, alternative hip-hop	Wicked Awesome, GOOD Music, Republic	
April 12	Yeah Yeah Yeahs	Mosquito	Art rock	Interscope	
April 15	LeAnn Rimes	Spitfire	Country, pop, rock	Curb	
April 15	Marsheaux	Inhale	Electronica, synth-pop	Undo Records	
April 15	Michael Bublé	To Be Loved	Traditional pop	Reprise, 143	
April 15	Sulk	Graceless	Psychedelic rock, shoegaze	Perfect Sound Forever	
April 15	Uncle Acid & the Deadbeats	Mind Control		Rise Above	
April 16	The Bunny the Bear	Stories	Post-hardcore, synth-pop, electronic rock	Victory	
April 16	Ghostface Killah	Twelve Reasons to Die	Hip-hop	Soul Temple Records, RED	
April 16	Iron & Wine	Ghost on Ghost	Indie pop, indie folk, jazz	Nonesuch, 4AD	
April 16	JJ Grey & Mofro	This River		Alligator	
April 16	Major Lazer	Free the Universe	EDM, dubstep, bounce	Mad Decent	
April 16	Meat Puppets	Rat Farm	Alternative rock	Megaforce	
April 16	Thee Oh Sees	Floating Coffin	Garage rock, psychedelic rock	Castle Face	
April 16	Snow White's Poison Bite	Featuring: Dr. Gruesome and the Gruesome Gory Horror Show		Victory	
April 16	Spacehog	As It Is on Earth		Hog Space Records	
April 16	Steve Earle	The Low Highway	Country	New West	
April 16	The Summer Set	Legendary	Country pop, emo pop, pop	Fearless	
April 16	The Thermals	Desperate Ground	Indie rock	Saddle Creek	
April 16	Willie Nelson	Let's Face the Music and Dance	Country	Legacy	
April 18	John Medeski	A Different Time	Jazz	OKeh	
April 19	Fantasia Barrino	Side Effects of You	R&B, soul	RCA, 19	
April 19	Gama Bomb	The Terror Tapes	Thrash metal, crossover thrash	AFM	
April 19	Phoenix	Bankrupt!	Indie rock	Glassnote	
April 19	will.i.am	#willpower	Hip-hop, dance-pop	will.i.am, Interscope	
April 21	Young Knives	Sick Octave	Experimental rock, post-punk revival	Gadzook	
April 22	Andrew Bayer	If It Were You, We'd Never Leave	Trance, progressive house	Anjunabeats	
April 22	Frank Turner	Tape Deck Heart	Folk rock	Xtra Mile	
April 22	Josh Kumra	Good Things Come to Those Who Don't Wait	Pop rock	RCA	
April 22	The Neighbourhood	I Love You	Indie rock	Columbia	
April 23	Laura Stevenson	Wheel	Folk	Don Giovanni	
April 23	Lori McKenna	Massachusetts	Folk	Signature Sounds	
April 23	No Joy	Wait to Pleasure	Indie rock, shoegaze, noise pop	Mexican Summer	
April 23	Rob Zombie	Venomous Rat Regeneration Vendor	Alternative metal, industrial metal, heavy metal	Zodiac Swan Records, T-Boy Records, Universal	
April 23	Snoop Lion	Reincarnated	Reggae fusion, dancehall, reggae	Mad Decent, Vice, RCA	
April 26	Deep Purple	Now What?!	Progressive metal	earMUSIC	
April 26	HIM	Tears on Tape	Hard rock	Universal	
April 26	The Ocean	Pelagial	Progressive metal, post-metal, sludge metal	Metal Blade	
April 29	Bo Bruce	Before I Sleep	Indie pop, trip hop	Mercury	
April 29	Colin Stetson	New History Warfare Vol. 3: To See More Light	Experimental	Constellation	
April 29	Neon Neon	Praxis Makes Perfect	Pop, electronica, hip-hop	Lex	
April 29	Rudimental	Home	Drum and bass	Asylum	
April 29	Sharks	Selfhood	Punk rock, alternative rock	Rise, Velvet Scene	
April 30	The Airborne Toxic Event	Such Hot Blood	Indie rock, alternative rock	Island	
April 30	Akron/Family	Sub Verses	Folk, psychedelic rock, experimental rock	Dead Oceans	
April 30	Arsis	Unwelcome	Melodic death metal, technical death metal	Nuclear Blast	
April 30	Chance the Rapper	Acid Rap	Hip-hop		
April 30	Chunk! No, Captain Chunk!	Pardon My French	Pop-punk, metalcore	Fearless	
April 30	Jessica Sanchez	Me, You & the Music	Pop	Interscope, 19	
April 30	Kenny Chesney	Life on a Rock	Country	Blue Chair, Columbia Nashville	
April 30	Lights	Siberia Acoustic	Acoustic, pop	Universal, Last Gang	
April 30	LL Cool J	Authentic	Hip-hop	S-BRO Music Group, 429	
April 30	Melvins	Everybody Loves Sausages	Experimental rock	Ipecac	
April 30	Os Mutantes	Fool Metal Jack	Psychedelic rock	Krian Music Group	
April 30	Rittz	The Life and Times of Jonny Valiant	Hip-hop	Strange Music	
April 30	The Stooges	Ready to Die	Garage rock	Fat Possum	
April 30	Streetlight Manifesto	The Hands That Thieve	Ska punk	Pentimento, Victory	

=== May ===
List of albums released in May 2013
Go to: January | February | March | April | May | June | July | August | September | October | November | December | Back to top
Release date	Artist	Album	Genre	Label	Ref.
May 1	Dean Blunt	The Redeemer	Experimental	Hippos in Tanks, World Music	
May 3	Armin van Buuren	Intense	Trance	Armada Music	
May 3	Little Boots	Nocturnes	Synth-pop, nu-disco, house	On Repeat	
May 3	Rod Stewart	Time	Rock	Capitol	
May 5	Knife Party	Haunted House	Dubstep	Earstorm, Big Beat	
May 5	The Winery Dogs	The Winery Dogs	Hard rock, blues rock	WHD, Loud & Proud, earMUSIC	
May 6	Benga	Chapter II	Bass music, dubstep	Sony Music	
May 6	Emmelie de Forest	Only Teardrops	Pop	Universal	
May 6	Hugh Laurie	Didn't It Rain	Blues	Warner Bros.	
May 6	Lady Antebellum	Golden	Country	Capitol Nashville	
May 6	New Device	Here We Stand	Hard rock	Southwold Recordings	
May 6	Noah and the Whale	Heart of Nowhere	Indie pop	Mercury	
May 6	Savages	Silence Yourself	Post-punk, alternative rock	Matador, Pop Noire	
May 6	Suicide Commando	When Evil Speaks	Aggrotech	Out of Line Music	
May 6	Various artists	The Great Gatsby: Music from Baz Luhrmann's Film	Hip-hop, jazz	Interscope	
May 7	98 Degrees	2.0	Pop	eOne Music	
May 7	Deerhunter	Monomania	Garage rock	4AD	
May 7	Fitz and the Tantrums	More Than Just a Dream	Indie pop	Elektra	
May 7	Havoc	13	Hip-hop	Nature Sounds	
May 7	Joe Satriani	Unstoppable Momentum	Instrumental rock	Epic	
May 7	Joshua Redman	Walking Shadows	Jazz	Nonesuch	
May 7	Justice	Access All Arenas	Electronic rock, electro house	Ed Banger	
May 7	Logic	Young Sinatra: Welcome to Forever	Hip-hop	Visionary	
May 7	Mickie James	Somebody's Gonna Pay	Country	eOne Music	
May 7	Mikal Cronin	MCII	Garage rock, indie rock, power pop	Merge	
May 7	Natalie Maines	Mother	Pop rock	Columbia	
May 7	Patty Griffin	American Kid	Americana	New West	
May 7	Pistol Annies	Annie Up	Country	RCA Nashville	
May 7	She & Him	Volume 3	Indie pop, alternative country	Merge, Double Six	
May 7	Talib Kweli	Prisoner of Conscious	Hip-hop, conscious hip-hop	Javotti Media, EMI, Capitol	
May 7	Yuna	Sixth Street		Verve	
May 9	Nine Muses	Wild		Star Empire	
May 10	Agnetha Fältskog	A	Pop, easy listening	Universal	
May 10	Demi Lovato	Demi	Pop	Hollywood	
May 10	MS MR	Secondhand Rapture	Indie pop, alternative rock	Columbia	
May 13	The Fall	Re-Mit	Post-punk	Cherry Red	
May 13	Gabrielle Aplin	English Rain	Folk pop	Parlophone	
May 13	Mark Lanegan and Duke Garwood	Black Pudding	Blues, alternative rock	Ipecac, Heavenly	
May 13	Primal Scream	More Light	Indie rock	Ignition Records	
May 14	Amy Grant	How Mercy Looks from Here	CCM, gospel, soft rock	Capitol CMG, Sparrow	
May 14	Anamanaguchi	Endless Fantasy	Chiptune	dream.hax, Alcopop!	
May 14	Christian McBride	People Music	Jazz	Mack Avenue	
May 14	Classixx	Hanging Gardens	Nu-disco	Innovative Leisure	
May 14	The Dillinger Escape Plan	One of Us Is the Killer	Mathcore	Sumerian	
May 14	Dungeonesse	Dungeonesse	Dance-pop, R&B	Secretly Canadian	
May 14	Escape the Fate	Ungrateful	Heavy metal, metalcore, hard rock	Eleven Seven	
May 14	Eve	Lip Lock	Hip-hop	From The Rib, RED	
May 14	George Strait	Love Is Everything	Neotraditional country, Western swing	MCA Nashville	
May 14	Homeboy Sandman	Kool Herc: Fertile Crescent	Hip-hop	Stones Throw	
May 14	Mindless Self Indulgence	How I Learned to Stop Giving a Shit and Love Mindless Self Indulgence	Electropunk, industrial hip-hop	Uppity Cracker	
May 14	Pop Evil	Onyx	Hard rock	eOne Music	
May 14	Trace Adkins	Love Will...	Country	Show Dog-Universal Music	
May 14	Vampire Weekend	Modern Vampires of the City	Indie rock, art pop	XL	
May 14	The Wonder Years	The Greatest Generation	Pop-punk	Hopeless	
May 16	On Bodies	The Long Con		Coffeebreath and Heartache Records, Irish VooDoo Records	
May 17	Daft Punk	Random Access Memories	Disco	Columbia	
May 17	The National	Trouble Will Find Me	Alternative rock	4AD	
May 17	Thirty Seconds to Mars	Love, Lust, Faith and Dreams	Experimental rock, art rock, electronic rock	Virgin	
May 20	Beth Hart and Joe Bonamassa	Seesaw	Blues rock	J&R Adventures	
May 20	Julian Cope	Revolutionary Suicide	Indie rock	Head Heritage	
May 20	Palisades	Outcasts	Post-hardcore	Rise	
May 20	Sound of Contact	Dimensionaut	Progressive rock	Inside Out Music	
May 20	Texas	The Conversation	Alternative rock	PIAS	
May 20	Visage	Hearts and Knives	Rock, synth-pop	Blitz Club	
May 21	Airbourne	Black Dog Barking	Hard rock	Roadrunner	
May 21	Darius Rucker	True Believers	Country	Capitol Records Nashville	
May 21	French Montana	Excuse My French	Hip-hop	Bad Boy, Maybach, Interscope	
May 21	Mykki Blanco	Betty Rubble: The Initiation	Alternative hip-hop	UNO Records	
May 21	New Politics	A Bad Girl in Harlem	Alternative rock	RCA	
May 21	Tesla Boy	The Universe Made of Darkness	Synth-pop, new wave	Gorby Reagan Records	
May 23	Tricky	False Idols	Trip hop	!K7	
May 24	Anvil	Hope in Hell	Heavy metal	Anvil Enterprises, The End, SPV/Steamhammer	
May 24	Kylesa	Ultraviolet	Sludge metal, psychedelic rock	Season of Mist	
May 27	Akala	The Thieves Banquet	Hip-hop, R&B	Illa State Records	
May 27	Blood Ceremony	The Eldritch Dark	Occult rock, hard rock	Rise Above	
May 27	Christopher Lee	Charlemagne: The Omens of Death	Heavy metal, death metal	Charlemagne Productions Ltd.	
May 27	CocoRosie	Tales of a GrassWidow	Electronic	City Slang	
May 27	Evile	Evile	Thrash metal	Earache, Century Media	
May 27	Laura Marling	Once I Was an Eagle	Indie folk, folk rock	Virgin	
May 27	Mount Kimbie	Cold Spring Fault Less Youth	Electronic, post-dubstep, art pop	Warp	
May 27	Stooshe	London with the Lights On	R&B	Warner Music UK, Future Cut	
May 27	Tesseract	Altered State	Progressive metal	Century Media	
May 28	Alice in Chains	The Devil Put Dinosaurs Here	Alternative metal, doom metal, sludge metal	Capitol	
May 28	Baths	Obsidian	Electronic pop, synth-pop	Anticon	
May 28	The-Dream	IV Play	R&B	Radio Killa, Def Jam	
May 28	Eisley	Currents	Indie pop	Equal Vision	
May 28	Frankie J	Faith, Hope y Amor	Latin	Universal Music Latino	
May 28	John Fogerty	Wrote a Song for Everyone	Country rock	Vanguard	
May 28	Skinny Puppy	Weapon	Electro-industrial	Metropolis	
May 28	Terence Blanchard	Magnetic	Jazz	Blue Note	
May 29	Children of Bodom	Halo of Blood	Melodic death metal	Nuclear Blast	
May 31	Disclosure	Settle	House, dance	PMR, Island	
May 31	Milky Chance	Sadnecessary	Folktronica	Lichtdicht	

=== June ===
List of albums released in June 2013
Go to: January | February | March | April | May | June | July | August | September | October | November | December | Back to top
Release date	Artist	Album	Genre	Label	Ref.
June 1	Agnez Mo	Agnez Mo	Pop, R&B	Entertainment Inc.	
June 2	Lenka	Shadows	Pop, indie pop	Skipalong Records	
June 3	Camera Obscura	Desire Lines	Indie pop	4AD	
June 3	iamamiwhoami	Bounty	Electropop, experimental pop	To whom it may concern., PIAS Cooperative	
June 3	Jon Hopkins	Immunity	Electronic, tech house, IDM	Domino	
June 3	Miles Kane	Don't Forget Who You Are	Indie rock	Columbia	
June 3	The Orb featuring Lee "Scratch" Perry	More Tales from the Orbservatory	Electronica, dub, IDM	Cooking Vinyl, The End	
June 3	Queens of the Stone Age	...Like Clockwork	Stoner rock, alternative rock, hard rock	Matador	
June 4	Barenaked Ladies	Grinning Streak	Alternative rock	Vanguard	
June 4	Big Black Delta	Big Black Delta	Electronic, indie rock	Master of Bates Records	
June 4	Capital Cities	In a Tidal Wave of Mystery	Indie pop, synth-pop	Lazy Hooks, Capitol	
June 4	City and Colour	The Hurry and the Harm	Alternative rock	Dine Alone, Cooking Vinyl	
June 4	Eleanor Friedberger	Personal Record	Indie pop	Merge	
June 4	Frankie & The Heartstrings	The Days Run Away	Indie rock	Wichita	
June 4	Future Bible Heroes	Partygoing	Synth-pop, Electropop	Merge	
June 4	George Benson	Inspiration: A Tribute to Nat King Cole	Jazz	Concord Jazz	
June 4	The Maine	Forever Halloween	Rock, alternative rock	Eighty One Twenty Three	
June 4	Matthew Morrison	Where It All Began		222	
June 4	Megadeth	Super Collider	Heavy metal, hard rock	Tradecraft, Universal	
June 4	Portugal. The Man	Evil Friends	Psychedelic rock, psychedelic pop, progressive rock	Atlantic	
June 4	Rogue Wave	Nightingale Floors	Indie rock, alternative rock	Vagrant	
June 4	Sleeping with Sirens	Feel	Post-hardcore, pop rock, alternative rock	Rise	
June 5	Boards of Canada	Tomorrow's Harvest	Electronica	Warp	
June 7	Andrew Stockdale	Keep Moving	Hard rock, blues rock, neo-psychedelia	Universal, Caroline, Island	
June 7	The Lonely Island	The Wack Album	Comedy hip-hop	Republic	
June 7	Mark Owen	The Art of Doing Nothing	Pop, electronic	Polydor	
June 10	Black Sabbath	13	Doom metal, blues rock	Vertigo, Universal	
June 10	Beady Eye	Be	Rock	Beady Eye, Columbia	
June 10	Emika	Dva	Electronic	Ninja Tune	
June 10	Goo Goo Dolls	Magnetic	Pop rock	Warner Bros.	
June 10	KT Tunstall	Invisible Empire // Crescent Moon	Acoustic rock, folk rock	Virgin EMI, Universal Records, Blue Note	
June 10	Neils Children	Dimly Lit	Psychedelia, hauntology, neo-psychedelia	Boudoir Moderne	
June 10	Status Quo	Bula Quo!	Rock	Fourth Chord Records	
June 11	Big D and the Kids Table	Stomp	Ska punk	Strictly Rude	
June 11	Big D and the Kids Table	Stroll	Reggae, dub	Strictly Rude	
June 11	Big Time Rush	24/Seven	Dance-rock	Nick, Columbia	
June 11	The Black Dahlia Murder	Everblack	Melodic death metal	Metal Blade	
June 11	BoySetsFire	While a Nation Sleeps...		Bridge 9, End Hits Records	
June 11	CSS	Planta	Electronic		
June 11	Deafheaven	Sunbather	Blackgaze, post-metal, atmospheric black metal	Deathwish	
June 11	Fat Tony	Smart Ass Black Boy	Hip-hop	Young One Records	
June 11	Full of Hell	Rudiments of Mutilation	Grindcore, powerviolence, sludge metal	A389 Records	
June 11	Gold Panda	Half of Where You Live	Electronic	Ghostly International	
June 11	Helen Marnie	Crystal World	Electronic		
June 11	Jarren Benton	My Grandma's Basement	Hip-hop, horrorcore	Funk Volume	
June 11	Jason Isbell	Southeastern	Alternative country, Americana	Southeastern	
June 11	Jimmy Eat World	Damage	Alternative rock, power pop	RCA	
June 11	Prodigy and The Alchemist	Albert Einstein	Hip-hop	Infamous Records	
June 11	Sandy	Sim		Universal	
June 11	Scale the Summit	The Migration	Progressive metal, progressive rock	Prosthetic	
June 11	Sturgill Simpson	High Top Mountain	Neotraditional country, honky-tonk	High Top Mountain Records, Loose	
June 12	Sigur Rós	Kveikur	Post-rock	XL	
June 14	Kelly Rowland	Talk a Good Game	R&B	Republic	
June 14	Kodaline	In a Perfect World	Indie rock	B-Unique, RCA Victor	
June 14	Studio Killers	Studio Killers	Synth-pop	Studio Killers Records	
June 17	Austra	Olympia	Synth-pop, house	Domino	
June 17	Dinosaur Pile-Up	Nature Nurture	Alternative rock, post-grunge, noise rock	SO Recordings	
June 17	Melt Yourself Down	Melt Yourself Down	Art punk, afrobeat	The Leaf Label	
June 17	Zomby	With Love	UK garage, dubstep	4AD	
June 18	3OH!3	Omens	Dance-pop	Photo Finish, Atlantic	
June 18	Billy Bang	Da Bang!	Jazz	Tum Records	
June 18	Falling in Reverse	Fashionably Late	Post-hardcore, pop-punk	Epitaph	
June 18	Green River Ordinance	Chasing Down the Wind	Country		
June 18	Hanson	Anthem	Pop rock	3CG	
June 18	J. Cole	Born Sinner	Hip-hop, R&B	Dreamville, Roc Nation, Columbia	
June 18	Kanye West	Yeezus	Hip-hop	Roc-A-Fella, Def Jam	
June 18	Mac Miller	Watching Movies with the Sound Off	Hip-hop	Rostrum	
June 18	Mala Rodríguez	Bruja	R&B, hip-hop	Universal Music	
June 18	Statik Selektah	Extended Play	Hip-hop	Showoff Records, Duck Down Music	
June 18	Tunng	Turbines	Folktronica	Full Time Hobby	
June 18	Wadada Leo Smith	Occupy the World	Jazz	TUM Records	
June 18	The World Is a Beautiful Place & I Am No Longer Afraid to Die	Whenever, If Ever	Emo, indie rock, post-hardcore	Topshelf	
June 19	Freddie Gibbs	ESGN	Hip-hop	ESGN	
June 20	Vince Staples and Larry Fisherman	Stolen Youth	Hip-hop	Blacksmith	
June 21	Fat Freddy's Drop	Blackbird	Dub	The Drop	
June 24	Bosnian Rainbows	Bosnian Rainbows	Alternative rock	Clouds Hill	
June 24	Deap Vally	Sistrionix	Garage rock	Island	
June 24	Forever the Sickest Kids	J.A.C.K.	Pop-punk, pop rock	Fearless	
June 24	Tom Odell	Long Way Down	Folk, indie pop	Columbia	
June 25	Amon Amarth	Deceiver of the Gods	Melodic death metal	Metal Blade, Sony Music	
June 25	Attila	About That Life	Metalcore	Artery	
June 25	August Burns Red	Rescue & Restore	Metalcore	Solid State	
June 25	Bass Drum of Death	Bass Drum of Death	Garage rock	Innovative Leisure	
June 25	Candy Claws	Ceres & Calypso in the Deep Time	Dream pop, shoegaze, noise pop	Two Syllable Records	
June 25	Hawthorne Heights	Zero	Alternative rock, emo, post-hardcore	Red Entertainment	
June 25	Mavis Staples	One True Vine	Gospel, soul, blues	Anti-	
June 25	Middle Class Rut	Pick Up Your Head	Alternative rock	Bright Antenna	
June 25	Queensrÿche	Queensrÿche	Heavy metal, progressive metal	Century Media, Avalon Records	
June 25	Serengeti	Kenny Dennis LP	Hip-hop	Anticon	
June 25	Skillet	Rise	Christian metal, hard rock	Word, Atlantic	
June 25	Smith Westerns	Soft Will		Mom + Pop Music	
June 25	Transplants	In a Warzone	Punk rock, rap rock	Epitaph	
June 25	Wale	The Gifted	Hip-hop	Maybach Music, Atlantic	
June 25	Willie Nile	American Ride	Rock	Loud & Proud	
June 26	Alexandros	Me No Do Karate.	Alternative rock, indie rock, pop-punk	RX-Records	
June 26	Run the Jewels	Run the Jewels	Hip-hop	Fool's Gold	
June 28	Bell X1	Chop Chop	Rock	BellyUp Records	
June 28	Big Scary	Not Art	Pop rock	Pieater, Barsuk	
June 28	Bliss n Eso	Circus in the Sky	Hip-hop	Illusive Sounds, Liberation Music	
June 28	Editors	The Weight of Your Love	Post-punk revival	PIAS	
June 28	Sirenia	Perils of the Deep Blue	Gothic metal, symphonic metal, doom metal	Nuclear Blast	

== Third quarter ==
=== July ===
List of albums released in July 2013
Go to: January | February | March | April | May | June | July | August | September | October | November | December | Back to top
Release date	Artist	Album	Genre	Label	Ref.
July 1	CFCF	Music for Objects	Electronica, minimal, neoclassical	Paper Bag, Dummy Records	
July 2	Belinda	Catarsis	Pop, electropop, dance-pop	Capitol Latin, Universal Music Latin	
July 2	Maya Jane Coles	Comfort	Deep house, tech house, trip hop	I/Am/Me	
July 2	Pretty Lights	A Color Map of the Sun	Electronica	Pretty Lights Music	
July 2	Relient K	Collapsible Lung	Alternative rock, pop rock	Mono vs Stereo	
July 4	Jay-Z	Magna Carta Holy Grail	Hip-hop	Roc-A-Fella, Roc Nation	
July 5	Ciara	Ciara	R&B	Epic	
July 5	Skylar Grey	Don't Look Down	Pop, hip-hop	Kidinakorner, Interscope	
July 8	Thee Faction	Good Politics: Your Role as an Active Citizen in Civil Society		Soviet Beret	
July 9	Butcher Babies	Goliath	Groove metal, metalcore	Century Media	
July 9	Colette Carr	Skitszo	Pop rap, dance-pop, electropop	Cherrytree, Interscope	
July 9	Flyleaf	Who We Are		A&M Octone, Polydor	
July 9	Front Line Assembly	Echogenetic	Electro-industrial	Metropolis	
July 9	Letlive	The Blackest Beautiful	Post-hardcore	Epitaph	
July 9	Night Birds	Born to Die in Suburbia		Grave Mistake Records, Taken By Surprise Records	
July 9	Thundercat	Apocalypse	Jazz fusion	Brainfeeder	
July 9	The Used	The Ocean of the Sky	Post-hardcore, alternative rock	Hopeless, Anger Music Group	
July 10	David Lynch	The Big Dream	Avant-rock, blues, electronica	Sacred Bones, Sunday Best	
July 12	Celia Pavey	This Music	Folk	Universal Music Australia	
July 12	Cody Simpson	Surfers Paradise	Pop, R&B	Atlantic	
July 12	Robin Thicke	Blurred Lines	Dance-pop, funk, R&B	Star Trak, Interscope	
July 12	Sara Bareilles	The Blessed Unrest	Pop rock, soul	Epic	
July 15	Pet Shop Boys	Electric	EDM	x2	
July 16	Ace Hood	Trials & Tribulations	Hip-hop	We the Best, Cash Money, Republic	
July 16	Andy Kaufman	Andy and His Grandmother		Drag City	
July 16	Cherry Poppin' Daddies	White Teeth, Black Thoughts	Swing, jazz, rock	Space Age Bachelor Pad Records	
July 16	Hieroglyphics	The Kitchen	Hip-hop	Hieroglyphics Imperium	
July 16	Kara Grainger	Shiver & Sigh	Blues, roots, soul	Eclecto Groove Records	
July 16	¡Mayday!	Believers	Hip-hop	Strange Music	
July 16	Mayer Hawthorne	Where Does This Door Go	Neo soul	Republic	
July 16	Philip H. Anselmo & The Illegals	Walk Through Exits Only	Groove metal, sludge metal	Housecore	
July 16	Sick Puppies	Connect	Alternative metal, hard rock, alternative rock	Capitol	
July 17	The Flatliners	Dead Language	Punk rock, melodic hardcore	Fat	
July 19	Jahméne Douglas	Love Never Fails	Soul, gospel	RCA	
July 19	Karnivool	Asymmetry	Progressive rock	Density Records, Cymatic Records	
July 19	Powerwolf	Preachers of the Night	Power metal, heavy metal	Napalm	
July 19	Selena Gomez	Stars Dance	EDM, electropop	Hollywood	
July 22	Nadine Shah	Love Your Dum and Mad		Apollo	
July 23	Black Tusk	Tend No Wounds	Sludge metal, hardcore punk, stoner metal	Relapse	
July 23	Bombadil	Metrics of Affection			
July 23	Drug Church	Paul Walker		No Sleep	
July 23	Edward Sharpe and the Magnetic Zeros	Edward Sharpe and the Magnetic Zeros	Indie folk, neo-psychedelia	Vagrant, Rough Trade	
July 23	Ethan Iverson, Lee Konitz, Larry Grenadier and Jorge Rossy	Costumes Are Mandatory	Jazz	HighNote	
July 23	Fuck Buttons	Slow Focus	Drone, post-rock	ATP	
July 23	Gogol Bordello	Pura Vida Conspiracy	Gypsy punk	ATO	
July 23	Hands Like Houses	Unimagine	Post-hardcore	Rise	
July 23	The Love Language	Ruby Red	Indie rock	Merge	
July 23	Marc Anthony	3.0	Salsa, tropical	Sony Music Latin	
July 23	Secrets	Fragile Figures	Metalcore, post-hardcore	Rise	
July 23	True Widow	Circumambulation	Shoegaze, stoner rock, slowcore	Relapse	
July 23	U-God	The Keynote Speaker	Hip-hop	Soul Temple	
July 23	We Came as Romans	Tracing Back Roots	Post-hardcore, metalcore	Equal Vision, Nuclear Blast	
July 24	Backstreet Boys	In a World Like This	Pop, dance, R&B	K-BAHN	
July 26	AlunaGeorge	Body Music	Synth-pop, R&B	Island	
July 26	Jay Sean	Neon	Pop, R&B	Cash Money, Republic	
July 29	Brown Eyed Girls	Black Box	Pop, R&B, dance	Nega Network, LOEN Entertainment	
July 29	f(x)	Pink Tape	Art pop, synth-pop, electropop	S.M. Entertainment	
July 30	Alela Diane	About Farewell	Indie folk	Rusted Blue Records	
July 30	Buddy Guy	Rhythm & Blues	Blues, soul	RCA	
July 30	Chimaira	Crown of Phantoms	Metalcore, nu metal	Entertainment One Music	
July 30	Crooked I	Apex Predator	Hip-hop	Treacherous C.O.B., Empire	
July 30	Earl Klugh	HandPicked	Smooth jazz	Heads Up International	
July 30	Emblem3	Nothing to Lose	Pop, reggae, pop rock	Syco Music, Columbia, Mr. Kanani	
July 30	Five Finger Death Punch	The Wrong Side of Heaven and the Righteous Side of Hell, Volume 1	Groove metal, alternative metal, hard rock	Prospect Park	
July 30	Ikonika	Aerotropolis	Electronic	Hyperdub	
July 30	Owl City	The Midsummer Station - Acoustic	Acoustic, synth-pop	Universal Republic	
July 30	Soulja Boy	Life After Fame			
July 30	Tech N9ne	Something Else	Hip-hop	Strange Music	
July 30	Vince Gill and Paul Franklin	Bakersfield	Country	MCA Nashville	

=== August ===
List of albums released in August 2013
Go to: January | February | March | April | May | June | July | August | September | October | November | December | Back to top
Release date	Artist	Album	Genre	Label	Ref.
August 2	The Defiled	Daggers	Industrial metal, metalcore	Nuclear Blast	
August 2	Exhumed	Necrocracy	Death metal	Relapse	
August 2	Mudhoney	Vanishing Point	Alternative rock	Sub Pop	
August 5	Chris Thile	Bach: Sonatas and Partitas, Vol. 1	Classical	Nonesuch	
August 5	Swim Deep	Where the Heaven Are We	Indie pop	Chess Club, RCA	
August 6	Asking Alexandria	From Death to Destiny	Metalcore, hard rock	Sumerian	
August 6	Black City Lights	Another Life		Stars & Letters	
August 6	Brett Eldredge	Bring You Back	Country	Atlantic	
August 6	Christian McBride	Out Here	Jazz	Mack Avenue	
August 6	The Civil Wars	The Civil Wars		Sensibility Music LLC, Columbia	
August 6	The Dangerous Summer	Golden Record		Hopeless	
August 6	Demon Queen	Exorcise Tape	Electro-funk, synth-funk, trap	Rad Cult Records, The Orchard	
August 6	Last Chance to Reason	Level 3	Progressive metal	Prosthetic	
August 6	Moderat	II		Monkeytown	
August 6	The Polyphonic Spree	Yes, It's True	Psychedelic pop, indie rock	Good, Kirtland, Cherry Red	
August 6	Pond	Hobo Rocket	Psychedelic rock, neo-psychedelia, hard rock	Modular	
August 6	Ras G	Back on the Planet	Instrumental hip-hop	Brainfeeder	
August 7	Zebrahead	Call Your Friends	Punk rock	MFZB Records	
August 9	Cloud Control	Dream Cave		Ivy League	
August 11	The Vaccines	Melody Calling		Columbia	
August 12	White Lies	Big TV	Indie rock, post-punk revival	Fiction, Harvest, Universal Music Canada	
August 13	K. Michelle	Rebellious Soul	R&B, soul	Atlantic	
August 13	Luke Bryan	Crash My Party	Country	Capitol Nashville	
August 13	Mulatu Astatke	Sketches of Ethiopia	Jazz	Jazz Village	
August 13	Parachute	Overnight	Pop rock	Mercury	
August 13	Sam Phillips	Push Any Button		Littlebox Recordings	
August 13	Terrace Martin	3ChordFold	Hip-hop	AKAI Music, Empire	
August 16	BT	A Song Across Wires	Trance, progressive house, dubstep	Armada Music	
August 16	Fleshgod Apocalypse	Labyrinth	Technical death metal, symphonic metal	Nuclear Blast	
August 16	Stromae	Racine carrée		Mosaert	
August 19	Charlotte Church	Three	Indie pop, alternative rock, post-rock	Alligator Wine	
August 19	Tired Pony	The Ghost of the Mountain	Rock	Polydor	
August 19	Travis	Where You Stand	Alternative rock, indie rock	Red Telephone Box, Kobalt	
August 20	ASAP Ferg	Trap Lord	Hip-hop	ASAP Worldwide, Polo Grounds Music, RCA	
August 20	Blessthefall	Hollow Bodies	Metalcore, electronicore, post-hardcore	Fearless	
August 20	Blue October	Sway	Alternative rock	Up/Down Records	
August 20	Born of Osiris	Tomorrow We Die Alive	Progressive metalcore, djent	Sumerian	
August 20	Earl Sweatshirt	Doris	Hip-hop	Tan Cressida, Columbia	
August 20	Jimmy Buffett	Songs from St. Somewhere		Mailboat	
August 20	John Mayer	Paradise Valley	Folk rock, country rock, Southern rock	Columbia, Sony Music	
August 20	Lee DeWyze	Frames	Folk, rock, pop	Vanguard, 19	
August 20	Shigeto	No Better Time Than Now		Ghostly International	
August 20	Superchunk	I Hate Music	Alternative rock, indie rock	Merge	
August 20	Tedeschi Trucks Band	Made Up Mind	Rock, R&B, soul	Sony Masterworks	
August 20	Ty Segall	Sleeper	Acoustic, neo-psychedelia, psychedelic folk	Drag City	
August 20	Zola Jesus	Versions		Sacred Bones	
August 23	Avenged Sevenfold	Hail to the King	Hard rock, heavy metal	Warner Bros.	
August 23	Ellie Goulding	Halcyon Days		Polydor	
August 23	Juicy J	Stay Trippy	Hip-hop	Kemosabe, Columbia	
August 23	Michael Monroe	Horns and Halos	Rock	Spinefarm	
August 23	Naughty Boy	Hotel Cabana	R&B	Naughty Boy, Virgin EMI	
August 23	ReVamp	Wild Card	Symphonic metal, progressive metal	Nuclear Blast	
August 24	King Krule	6 Feet Beneath the Moon	Indie rock	True Panther, XL	
August 26	Franz Ferdinand	Right Thoughts, Right Words, Right Action	Indie rock, dance-punk, dance-rock	Domino	
August 26	Money	The Shadow of Heaven	Dream pop, indie pop	Bella Union	
August 27	Big Sean	Hall of Fame	Hip-hop	GOOD Music, Def Jam	
August 27	DevilDriver	Winter Kills	Groove metal, melodic death metal	Napalm	
August 27	Everlast	The Life Acoustic	Blues	Martyr Inc Records, EMI	
August 27	Goodie Mob	Age Against the Machine	Hip-hop	The Right Records, Primary Wave Music, Atlantic	
August 28	Tarja Turunen	Colours in the Dark	Symphonic metal	earMUSIC	
August 30	Ariana Grande	Yours Truly	Pop, R&B	Republic	
August 30	John Legend	Love in the Future	R&B, soul	GOOD Music, Columbia	
August 30	Nine Inch Nails	Hesitation Marks	Electronic, electronic rock, alternative rock	Columbia, The Null Corporation	
August 30	R.A. the Rugged Man	Legends Never Die	Hip-hop	Nature Sounds	
August 31	Jackson and His Computerband	Glow	IDM, French house	Warp	
August 31	Kayo Dot	Hubardo	Avant-garde metal, black metal, experimental rock	Ice Level Music	

=== September ===
List of albums released in September 2013
Go to: January | February | March | April | May | June | July | August | September | October | November | December | Back to top
Release date	Artist	Album	Genre	Label	Ref.
September 1	Evan Parker, Barry Guy, and Paul Lytton	Live at Maya Recordings Festival	Free improvisation	NoBusiness	
September 1	Lil Wayne	Dedication 5	Hip-hop	Young Money, Aphilliates Music Group	
September 2	The 1975	The 1975	Indie rock	Polydor, Dirty Hit	
September 2	Glasvegas	Later...When the TV Turns to Static	Indie rock	BMG	
September 2	Pixies	EP1	Alternative rock		
September 2	The Safety Fire	Mouth of Swords	Progressive metal	Inside Out Music, Century Media	
September 3	Chelsea Wolfe	Pain Is Beauty	Experimental rock, post-punk, gothic rock	Sargent House	
September 3	The Julie Ruin	Run Fast	Indie rock, electroclash	Dischord	
September 3	Natalia Kills	Trouble	Synth-pop	will.i.am, Cherrytree, Interscope	
September 3	Neko Case	The Worse Things Get, the Harder I Fight, the Harder I Fight, the More I Love You	Country, alternative rock	Anti-	
September 3	Okkervil River	The Silver Gymnasium	Indie rock, folk rock	ATO	
September 3	Tamar Braxton	Love and War	R&B	Epic, Streamline Records	
September 3	Various artists	Boardwalk Empire Volume 2: Music from the HBO Original Series		ABKCO	
September 3	Vista Chino	Peace	Stoner rock	Napalm	
September 6	Emilíana Torrini	Tookah	Indie pop	Rough Trade	
September 6	Goldfrapp	Tales of Us	Folktronica	Mute	
September 6	Janelle Monáe	The Electric Lady	Neo soul, psychedelic soul, rock	Wondaland Arts Society, Bad Boy, Atlantic	
September 6	London Grammar	If You Wait	Electronica, downtempo, pop	Metal & Dust, Ministry of Sound	
September 6	Ministry	From Beer to Eternity	Industrial metal, thrash metal	13th Planet	
September 6	múm	Smilewound	Electronica, experimental	Morr Music	
September 6	Tonight Alive	The Other Side	Pop-punk, pop rock, alternative rock	Fearless, Sony Music Australia	
September 9	Arctic Monkeys	AM	Indie rock	Domino	
September 9	Balance and Composure	The Things We Think We're Missing	Alternative rock	No Sleep	
September 9	Delorean	Apar	Dance	Mushroom Pillow	
September 9	Sons of Kemet	Burn	Jazz, world	Naim	
September 9	The Strypes	Snapshot	Rhythm and blues, rock	Virgin EMI	
September 10	2 Chainz	B.O.A.T.S. II: Me Time	Hip-hop	Def Jam	
September 10	Earth, Wind & Fire	Now, Then & Forever	Rhythm and blues, funk	Legacy	
September 10	Gloria Estefan	The Standards	Traditional pop, swing	Crescent Moon, Sony Masterworks	
September 10	Kaskade	Atmosphere	Dance, progressive house, deep house	Ultra	
September 10	Keith Urban	Fuse	Country	Hit Red, Capitol Records Nashville	
September 10	Moving Mountains	Moving Mountains	Indie rock, post-rock	Triple Crown	
September 10	Rashad Becker	Traditional Music of Notional Species Vol. I	Electronic	PAN	
September 10	Sean Kingston	Back 2 Life	Reggae, hip-hop, R&B	Beluga Heights, Epic	
September 10	Sheryl Crow	Feels Like Home	Country rock	Warner Music Nashville	
September 10	The Weeknd	Kiss Land	R&B	XO, Republic	
September 11	Man Man	On Oni Pond	Experimental rock	Anti-	
September 13	Avicii	True	Folktronica	PRMD Music	
September 13	Elton John	The Diving Board	Rock	Capitol, Mercury	
September 13	The Naked and Famous	In Rolling Waves	Pop, electro, alternative rock	Fiction, Island	
September 16	Birdy	Fire Within	Indie pop	14th Floor, Atlantic	
September 16	God Is an Astronaut	Origins	Post-rock	Rocket Girl	
September 16	Manic Street Preachers	Rewind the Film	Folk, rock	Columbia	
September 16	Nightmares on Wax	Feelin' Good	Electronic, techno	Warp	
September 16	Placebo	Loud Like Love	Alternative rock	Universal	
September 16	Sebadoh	Defend Yourself	Indie rock	Joyful Noise, Domino	
September 17	Bill Callahan	Dream River	Indie folk	Drag City	
September 17	Billy Currington	We Are Tonight	Country	Mercury Nashville	
September 17	Daedelus	Drown Out	Electronic	Anticon	
September 17	The Devil Wears Prada	8:18	Metalcore	Roadrunner	
September 17	Elvis Costello and the Roots	Wise Up Ghost	Funk	Blue Note	
September 17	Grouplove	Spreading Rumours	Alternative rock	Canvasback, Atlantic	
September 17	Gwar	Battle Maximus	Thrash metal	Metal Blade	
September 17	Justin Moore	Off the Beaten Path	Country	Valory Music	
September 17	Mark Lanegan	Imitations		Vagrant, Heavenly	
September 17	MGMT	MGMT	Psychedelic rock	Columbia	
September 17	Plastic Ono Band	Take Me to the Land of Hell	Art rock, electronic, indie rock	Chimera Music	
September 17	San Fermin	San Fermin		Downtown	
September 17	The Shondes	The Garden		Exotic Fever	
September 17	Someone Still Loves You Boris Yeltsin	Fly by Wire	Indie pop	Polyvinyl	
September 17	Stray from the Path	Anonymous	Hardcore punk, nu metalcore, rap metal	Sumerian	
September 17	Various artists	Self Made Vol. 3	Hip-hop	Maybach Music	
September 17	Windhand	Soma	Doom metal	Relapse	
September 17	Zendaya	Zendaya	R&B	Hollywood	
September 18	Le1f	Tree House	Hip-hop	Camp & Street	
September 20	Babasónicos	Romantisísmico	Alternative rock	Sony Music Latin	
September 20	Cher	Closer to the Truth	Dance-pop	Warner Bros.	
September 20	Chvrches	The Bones of What You Believe	Electronic, synth-pop	Virgin	
September 20	Jason Derulo	Tattoos	Pop, R&B	Beluga Heights, Warner Bros.	
September 20	Kings of Leon	Mechanical Bull	Southern rock, blues rock, post-punk revival	RCA	
September 20	Krewella	Get Wet		Columbia	
September 20	Sting	The Last Ship	Rock, jazz, folk	A&M, Cherrytree	
September 23	Anneke van Giersbergen	Drive	Alternative rock, pop rock	Inside Out Music	
September 23	Dream Theater	Dream Theater	Progressive metal, progressive rock	Roadrunner	
September 23	Glamour of the Kill	Savages			
September 23	Icona Pop	This Is... Icona Pop		Big Beat, Atlantic	
September 23	Jessie J	Alive	R&B, pop	Lava, Universal Republic	
September 23	Mazzy Star	Seasons of Your Day	Alternative rock, dream pop	Rhymes of an Hour Records	
September 23	Roy Harper	Man and Myth	Folk, folk baroque, indie folk	Bella Union	
September 24	Deer Tick	Negativity	Indie rock, alternative country	Partisan	
September 24	Drake	Nothing Was the Same	Hip-hop	OVO Sound, Young Money, Cash Money	
September 24	John Zorn and Thurston Moore	@	Free jazz	Tzadik	
September 24	R5	Louder	Pop rock	Hollywood	
September 24	Sammy Hagar	Sammy Hagar & Friends	Hard rock	Frontiers Music	
September 24	Sarah Jarosz	Build Me Up from Bones	Bluegrass	Sugar Hill	
September 24	A Skylit Drive	Rise	Post-hardcore	Tragic Hero	
September 24	Touché Amoré	Is Survived By	Post-hardcore, melodic hardcore, screamo	Deathwish	
September 24	Vijay Iyer and Mike Ladd	Holding It Down: The Veterans' Dreams Project	Jazz	Pi	
September 25	Alter Bridge	Fortress	Alternative metal	Roadrunner, EMI	
September 27	Casper	Hinterland			
September 27	Haim	Days Are Gone	Pop rock, indie pop	Polydor	
September 27	Hatesphere	Murderlust	Thrash metal, melodic death metal	Massacre	
September 27	Justin Timberlake	The 20/20 Experience – 2 of 2	R&B, pop	RCA	
September 27	King Gizzard & the Lizard Wizard	Float Along – Fill Your Lungs	Psychedelic rock, garage rock, raga rock	Flightless	
September 27	Lorde	Pure Heroine	Dream pop, electronica, electropop	Universal, Lava, Republic	
September 29	Meek Mill	Dreamchasers 3	Hip-hop	Maybach, Dream Chasers	
September 30	Blitzen Trapper	VII	Alternative country, country rap	Vagrant, Lojinx	
September 30	Deltron 3030	Event 2	Alternative hip-hop	Deltron Partners, Bulk Recordings	
September 30	Dizzee Rascal	The Fifth	Hip-hop, grime	Dirtee Stank, Universal Music	
September 30	Fates Warning	Darkness in a Different Light	Progressive metal	Inside Out Music	
September 30	The Field	Cupid's Head	Techno	Kompakt	
September 30	Joan Jett and the Blackhearts	Unvarnished	Hard rock	Blackheart	
September 30	Mack Wilds	New York: A Love Story	R&B	Louder Than Life, RED	
September 30	Nelly	M.O.	R&B, hip-hop	Republic	
September 30	Oneohtrix Point Never	R Plus Seven	Ambient, experimental, electronic	Warp	
September 30	Polvo	Siberia	Indie rock	Merge	
September 30	Rush	Vapor Trails Remixed	Hard rock, heavy metal	Atlantic, Rhino	
September 30	Sub Focus	Torus	Drum and bass, dubstep	Mercury	

== Fourth quarter ==
=== October ===
List of albums released in October 2013
Go to: January | February | March | April | May | June | July | August | September | October | November | December | Back to top
Release date	Artist	Album	Genre	Label	Ref.
October 1	Arve Henriksen	Places of Worship		Rune Grammofon	
October 1	Dr. Dog	B-Room	Neo-psychedelia	Anti-	
October 1	Fuzz	Fuzz		In the Red	
October 1	Melt-Banana	Fetch	Noise rock, experimental rock, hardcore punk	A-ZAP	
October 1	Moby	Innocents		Little Idiot, Mute	
October 1	Quasi	Mole City	Indie rock	Kill Rock Stars	
October 1	Scar the Martyr	Scar the Martyr	Industrial metal	Roadrunner	
October 1	Tony Molina	Six Tracks EP	Power pop, indie rock, lo-fi	Matador	
October 4	Darkside	Psychic	Electronic	Matador	
October 4	Daryl Braithwaite	Forever the Tourist	Rock, pop	Sony Music Australia	
October 4	Miley Cyrus	Bangerz	Pop	RCA	
October 4	Sleigh Bells	Bitter Rivals	Indie rock	Mom + Pop Music	
October 7	Anna Calvi	One Breath	Art rock	Domino	
October 7	Chase & Status	Brand New Machine	Drum and bass, downtempo	Mercury	
October 7	Dan le Sac vs Scroobius Pip	Repent Replenish Repeat	Hip-hop, electronic	Sunday Best, Strange Famous	
October 7	The Feeling	Boy Cried Wolf	Soft rock	BMG	
October 7	Korn	The Paradigm Shift	Nu metal	Caroline, Prospect Park	
October 7	Lee Ranaldo and the Dust	Last Night on Earth	Alternative rock, experimental rock	Matador	
October 7	Prefab Sprout	Crimson/Red	Pop	Icebreaker Records, Kitchenware	
October 7	Pusha T	My Name Is My Name	Hip-hop	GOOD Music, Def Jam	
October 8	Cage the Elephant	Melophobia	Alternative rock	RCA	
October 8	Cassadee Pope	Frame by Frame	Country pop	Republic Nashville	
October 8	Dance Gavin Dance	Acceptance Speech	Post-hardcore	Rise	
October 8	Danny Brown	Old	Alternative hip-hop	Fool's Gold, Goliath	
October 8	Dave Hause	Devour	Rock	Rise	
October 8	A Day to Remember	Common Courtesy	Pop-punk, metalcore	ADTR Records	
October 8	Joe Nichols	Crickets	Country	Red Bow	
October 8	Lissie	Back to Forever	Pop	Fat Possum	
October 8	A Loss for Words	Before It Caves		Rise	
October 8	Mayday Parade	Monsters in the Closet	Pop-punk, pop rock	Fearless	
October 8	of Montreal	Lousy with Sylvianbriar	Indie rock	Polyvinyl	
October 8	Nipsey Hussle	Crenshaw	Hip-hop	All Money In	
October 8	Panic! at the Disco	Too Weird to Live, Too Rare to Die!	Alternative rock	Fueled by Ramen, Decaydance	
October 8	Patty Griffin	Silver Bell	Folk, folk rock, Americana	A&M, Universal Music Enterprises	
October 8	PUP	PUP	Punk rock, hardcore punk, indie rock	Royal Mountain	
October 8	RJD2	More Is Than Isn't	Hip-hop, electronica	RJ's Electrical Connections	
October 8	State Champs	The Finer Things	Pop-punk	Pure Noise	
October 8	St. Lucia	When the Night	Pop	Neon Gold, Columbia	
October 8	Ulver	Messe I.X–VI.X	Experimental, dark ambient	Jester	
October 9	Friendzone	DX	Instrumental hip-hop		
October 10	Trivium	Vengeance Falls	Metalcore, thrash metal, heavy metal	Roadrunner	
October 11	Death Angel	The Dream Calls for Blood	Thrash metal	Nuclear Blast	
October 11	Gavin DeGraw	Make a Move	Pop rock, blue-eyed soul	RCA	
October 11	Paul McCartney	New	Rock	Virgin EMI, Hear Music	
October 11	The Saturdays	Living for the Weekend	Pop, electropop	Fascination, Polydor	
October 14	The Dismemberment Plan	Uncanney Valley	Indie rock	Partisan	
October 14	Eliza Doolittle	In Your Hands	Pop, indie pop	Parlophone	
October 14	Feed Me	Calamari Tuesday	Electro house, progressive house, dubstep	Sotto Voce	
October 14	Four Tet	Beautiful Rewind	Electronica	Text	
October 14	Gary Numan	Splinter (Songs from a Broken Mind)	Industrial rock, gothic rock, dark wave	Mortal Records, Cooking Vinyl	
October 14	Morcheeba	Head Up High	Synth-pop	PIAS	
October 14	Tim Hecker	Virgins	Electroacoustic, ambient, experimental	Kranky, Paper Bag	
October 14	Tindersticks	Across Six Leap Years		Lucky Dog Recordings, City Slang	
October 15	The Avett Brothers	Magpie and the Dandelion	Indie rock, folk rock	American	
October 15	Black Milk	No Poison No Paradise	Hip-hop	Computer Ugly Records, Fat Beats Records	
October 15	Cass McCombs	Big Wheel and Others	Indie rock	Domino	
October 15	Cults	Static	Indie rock, pop	Columbia	
October 15	Diane Birch	Speak a Little Louder	Rock, synth-pop	S-Curve	
October 15	Don Trip and Starlito	Step Brothers Two	Southern hip-hop		
October 15	Doomriders	Grand Blood	Sludge metal	Deathwish	
October 15	The Head and the Heart	Let's Be Still	Indie rock, indie pop	Sub Pop	
October 15	Icon for Hire	Icon for Hire	Alternative metal	Tooth & Nail	
October 15	Kevin Devine	Bulldozer		Devinyl Records	
October 15	Kevin Devine & the Goddamn Band	Bubblegum		Devinyl Records	
October 15	Lizzo	Lizzobangers	Alternative hip-hop	TGNP	
October 15	Luke Temple	Good Mood Fool	Indie rock	Secretly Canadian	
October 15	Monster Magnet	Last Patrol	Stoner rock	Napalm	
October 15	Pearl Jam	Lightning Bolt	Alternative rock	Monkeywrench	
October 15	Pelican	Forever Becoming	Post-metal	Southern Lord	
October 15	Red Fang	Whales and Leeches	Stoner rock	Relapse	
October 15	Toad the Wet Sprocket	New Constellation	Alternative rock	Abe's Records	
October 15	Willie Nelson	To All the Girls...	Country	Legacy	
October 16	CFCF	Outside		Paper Bag, Dummy Records	
October 18	Fifth Harmony	Better Together	Pop	Syco Music	
October 18	James Blunt	Moon Landing	Pop rock, folk rock	Atlantic	
October 18	Katy Perry	Prism	Pop	Capitol	
October 18	Motörhead	Aftershock	Heavy metal, hard rock	UDR GmbH	
October 18	Poliça	Shulamith	Synth-pop, indietronica	Mom + Pop Music	
October 21	Future of the Left	How to Stop Your Brain in an Accident	Post-hardcore, noise rock	Prescriptions Music	
October 21	Omar Souleyman	Wenu Wenu	Dabke, electronic	Ribbon	
October 22	AFI	Burials	Alternative rock	Republic	
October 22	Best Coast	Fade Away	Alternative rock, jangle pop	Jewel City	
October 22	Brandy Clark	12 Stories	Country, Americana	Slate Creek	
October 22	Donna Summer	Love to Love You Donna	Electronic, disco, house	Verve	
October 22	Emphatic	Another Life	Rock	Epochal Artists, Capitol	
October 22	I See Stars	New Demons	Electronicore	Sumerian	
October 22	Lincoln Durham	Exodus of the Deemed Unrighteous	Roots rock, alternative folk, blues	Droog Records	
October 22	Ryan Hemsworth	Guilt Trips	Electronic	Last Gang	
October 22	Testament	Dark Roots of Thrash	Thrash metal	Nuclear Blast	
October 25	Aloe Blacc	Lift Your Spirit	Pop, R&B, soul	Interscope	
October 25	Die Krupps	The Machinists of Joy	Industrial, EBM	Synthetic Symphony	
October 25	Geir Lysne	New Circle		ACT Music	
October 25	Kelly Clarkson	Wrapped in Red	Christmas, pop	RCA	
October 25	Kerser	S.C.O.T.		Obese	
October 28	Arcade Fire	Reflektor	Dance-rock, art rock	Sonovox, Merge	
October 28	Ayreon	The Theory of Everything	Progressive metal, progressive rock	Inside Out Music	
October 28	Juana Molina	Wed 21	Folktronica, experimental rock, IDM	Crammed Discs	
October 28	Union J	Union J	Pop	Syco Music, RCA	
October 29	Los Campesinos!	No Blues	Indie rock	Wichita, Turnstile Music, Heart Swells	
October 29	The Flower Kings	Desolation Rose	Progressive rock	Inside Out	
October 29	Jonwayne	Rap Album One	Hip-hop	Stones Throw	
October 29	Minor Alps	Get There	Pop rock	Barsuk	
October 29	Moonface	Julia with Blue Jeans On	Indie rock	Jagjaguwar	
October 29	Protest the Hero	Volition	Progressive metal	Razor & Tie	
October 29	Robert Glasper Experiment	Black Radio 2	Jazz, R&B	Blue Note	
October 29	Russian Circles	Memorial	Post-rock	Sargent House	
October 29	Sirens and Sailors	Skeletons	Metalcore	Artery, Razor & Tie	
October 29	Sky Ferreira	Night Time, My Time	Indie rock, synth-pop	Capitol	
October 29	Son Lux	Lanterns	Post-rock, experimental, electronic	Joyful Noise	
October 29	Toby Keith	Drinks After Work	Country	Show Dog-Universal Music	
October 29	White Denim	Corsicana Lemonade	Indie rock, garage rock, progressive rock	Downtown	
October 29	Yuna	Nocturnal	Pop, indie pop, dream pop	Verve	
October 31	Pet Slimmers of the Year	Fragments of Uniforms	Post-metal	Candlelight	

=== November ===
List of albums released in November 2013
Go to: January | February | March | April | May | June | July | August | September | October | November | December | Back to top
Release date	Artist	Album	Genre	Label	Ref.
November 1	Avril Lavigne	Avril Lavigne	Pop rock, pop	Epic	
November 1	Celine Dion	Loved Me Back to Life	Pop, R&B	Columbia	
November 1	Cut Copy	Free Your Mind	Synth-pop, dance-punk	Modular	
November 1	Delusional Thomas	Delusional Thomas	Horrorcore		
November 1	James Arthur	James Arthur	Pop, R&B, soul	Syco Music	
November 1	M.I.A.	Matangi	Experimental hip-hop, bhangra	N.E.E.T., Interscope	
November 1	Seventh Key	I Will Survive	Hard rock	Frontiers Music	
November 1	Shane Filan	You and Me	Pop, country	Capitol	
November 1	Tinie Tempah	Demonstration	Hip-hop, grime, electronic	Parlophone	
November 4	Ejecta	Dominae	Synth-pop	Copyright Control, Driftless Recordings, Happy Death	
November 4	Midlake	Antiphon	Psychedelic folk, indie rock	ATO, Bella Union	
November 4	The Wanted	Word of Mouth		Island	
November 5	Black Flag	What The...	Hardcore punk	SST	
November 5	Dream Theater	Live at Luna Park	Progressive metal	Eagle Rock	
November 5	Eminem	The Marshall Mathers LP 2	Hip-hop	Aftermath, Shady, Interscope	
November 5	Impending Doom	Death Will Reign	Deathcore	EOne	
November 5	Luscious Jackson	Magic Hour	Alternative rock	City Song	
November 5	Melvins	Tres Cabrones	Sludge metal, experimental rock	Ipecac	
November 5	Scott Stapp	Proof of Life	Hard rock, post-grunge	Wind-up	
November 5	Stryper	No More Hell to Pay	Christian metal, heavy metal	Frontiers	
November 5	Various artists	12 Years a Slave	Blues, R&B, soul	Columbia	
November 5	Various artists	Punk Goes Christmas	Christmas, Pop-punk, pop rock	Fearless	
November 5	A Wilhelm Scream	Partycrasher	Punk rock, melodic hardcore	No Idea	
November 5	Yandel	De Líder a Leyenda	Reggaeton, Latin pop	Sony Music	
November 6	Lady Gaga	Artpop	Synth-pop	Streamline Records, Interscope	
November 8	Adam Brand	My Acoustic Diary	Country	Adam Brand Enterprises, ABC Music	
November 8	Gabriella Cilmi	The Sting	Soul	Sweetness Tunes	
November 8	Little Mix	Salute	Pop, R&B	Syco Music, Columbia	
November 9	The Fall	The Remainderer	Post-punk	Cherry Red	
November 11	Get Scared	Everyone's Out to Get Me	Alternative rock, gothic rock, post-hardcore	Fearless	
November 11	Kellie Pickler	The Woman I Am	Country	Black River	
November 11	Roger Taylor	Fun on Earth	Rock	Virgin EMI	
November 12	Foxing	The Albatross	Emo	Count Your Lucky Stars	
November 12	Mount Eerie	Pre-Human Ideas	Electronic, experimental	P.W. Elverum & Sun.	
November 12	Title Fight	Spring Songs	Indie rock, punk rock, emo	Revelation	
November 12	Various artists	Inside Llewyn Davis	Folk	Nonesuch	
November 13	Death Grips	Government Plates	Experimental hip-hop, industrial, deconstructed club	Third Worlds, Harvest	
November 13	Sacrificium	Prey for Your Gods			
November 15	Leaves' Eyes	Symphonies of the Night	Symphonic metal	Napalm	
November 18	Blood Orange	Cupid Deluxe		Domino	
November 18	Jake Bugg	Shangri La	Indie rock	Mercury, Island	
November 18	Robbie Williams	Swings Both Ways	Swing, pop	Island, Universal	
November 19	Andrew Bird	I Want to See Pulaski at Night	Indie folk	Grimsey Records	
November 19	Daughtry	Baptized	Pop rock	RCA	
November 19	Five Finger Death Punch	The Wrong Side of Heaven and the Righteous Side of Hell, Volume 2	Groove metal, alternative metal, hard rock	Prospect Park	
November 19	The Godfathers	Once Upon a Crime	East Coast hip-hop	Psycho+Logical	
November 19	Polar Bear Club	Death Chorus	Post-hardcore, alternative rock, punk rock	Rise	
November 20	Ghost	If You Have Ghost		Republic, Loma Vista	
November 20	Hatesphere	New Hell	Thrash metal, melodic death metal	Massacre	
November 22	Gary Barlow	Since I Saw You Last	Pop, folk	Polydor	
November 22	tyDi	Hotel Rooms	Electronic, chill-out, glitch	Armada Music	
November 24	Hopsin	Knock Madness	Hip-hop	Funk Volume	
November 25	Billie Joe Armstrong and Norah Jones	Foreverly	Folk	Reprise	
November 25	Danielle Bradbery	Danielle Bradbery	Country	Big Machine	
November 25	One Direction	Midnight Memories	Pop	Syco Music, Columbia, Sony Music	
November 25	The Warlocks	Skull Worship	Psychedelic rock	Zap Banana	
November 26	Destroyer	Five Spanish Songs	Indie rock, indie folk	Merge, Dead Oceans	
November 26	Five Iron Frenzy	Engine of a Million Plots	Christian rock, alternative rock	Department of Biophysics	
November 26	Hammock	Oblivion Hymns	Ambient, post-rock	Hammock Music	
November 26	Kevin Morby	Harlem River	Folk rock	Woodsist	
November 29	Benedictum	Obey	Heavy metal, power metal	Frontiers	
November 29	Britney Spears	Britney Jean	Pop, EDM	RCA	
November 29	Nick Cave and the Bad Seeds	Live from KCRW	Rock	Bad Seed Ltd.	

=== December ===
List of albums released in December 2013
Go to: January | February | March | April | May | June | July | August | September | October | November | December | Back to top
Release date	Artist	Album	Genre	Label	Ref.
December 3	Boston	Life, Love & Hope	Hard rock	Frontiers Music	
December 3	Jake Owen	Days of Gold	Country	RCA Nashville	
December 3	Xiu Xiu	Nina	Avant-garde jazz	Graveface	
December 6	Childish Gambino	Because the Internet	Hip-hop	Glassnote, Island	
December 9	Exo	Miracles in December	Christmas, R&B, ballad	SM	
December 9	Ithilien	From Ashes to the Frozen Land		Mighty Music	
December 10	E-40	The Block Brochure: Welcome to the Soil 4	Hip-hop		
December 10	E-40	The Block Brochure: Welcome to the Soil 5	Hip-hop		
December 10	E-40	The Block Brochure: Welcome to the Soil 6	Hip-hop		
December 10	Evergreen Terrace	Dead Horses	Metalcore, melodic hardcore	Rise	
December 10	Girls' Generation	Love & Peace	Electropop, dance-pop	Nayutawave, Universal	
December 10	R. Kelly	Black Panties	R&B, hip-hop	RCA	
December 10	Roc Marciano	Marci Beaucoup	Hip-hop	Man Bites Dog Records	
December 10	Shila Amzah	Shila Amzah	Pop	Shila Amzah Entertainment	
December 11	Burial	Rival Dealer	UK garage, ambient, broken beat	Hyperdub	
December 13	Beyoncé	Beyoncé	Electro, R&B	Columbia, Parkwood	
December 17	B.o.B.	Underground Luxury	Hip-hop	Rebel Rock Entertainment, Grand Hustle, Atlantic	
December 18	Skálmöld and the Iceland Symphony Orchestra	Skálmöld & Sinfóníuhljómsveit Íslands	Heavy metal	Sena	
December 21	Kool A.D.	Not O.K.	Hip-hop, alternative hip-hop		
December 23	Justin Bieber	Journals	Pop, R&B	Island, RBMG, Schoolboy	
