= Minsk II (disambiguation) =

Minsk II is the second cease-fire agreement in the War in Donbas, Ukraine.

Minsk-II or Minsk-2 may also refer to:

- Minsk-2 International Airport, Belarus
- MINSK-2, of the Minsk family of computers
- "Minsk-2", a song on the album Modern Thrills by the Russian band Tesla Boy
