= Ebba Åsman =

Swedish jazz musician

Ebba Åsman is a Swedish jazz musician, singer and trombonist. She was nominated for a Grammis for her second studio album, Be Free.

== Early life and education ==
Åsman was born in Hammarö, a municipality in Värmland, Sweden. She studied music from the age of seven years old at the Karlstad Municipal Singing and Music School. Initially, she wanted to learn the drums; however, the waiting list for the instrument was too long, so her brother encouraged her to pursue the trombone instead. At the age of 15, she moved to Stockholm, where she attended the Södra Latins Gymnasium, then studied music at the Royal Conservatory of The Hague. Her examiner there, Ilja Reijngoud, advised her to continue her trombone training at the Rotterdam Conservatory of Music, where she studied from 2018.

== Career ==
Åsman's debut album, Zoom Out, was released in 2019 on Stockholm Jazz Records. Its "spherical, open jazz" was praised by critics as a "good example of the fusion of different cultural influences." She was mentored by Nils Landgren. She toured Europe with Landgren, the all-star funk collective Brooklyn Funk Essentials, and with her own band. She performed at the North Sea Jazz Festival with the Greyheads in 2019. She performed at Jazz Baltica in 2021 with her quartet, which includes Anna Gréta Sigurðardóttir, Petter Olofsson, and Robert Ikiz. The Dutch cultural broadcaster NTR dedicated a portrait program to her in 2020 in its "New Generation" series.

In 2022, Åsman represented Sweden in the Euradio Jazz Orchestra under the direction of Hendrika Entzian, and in 2023 the musician released her second album Be Free. The album earned Åsman a Swedish Grammy nomination in the Best Jazz category. Åsman’s third album When You Know was released on 21 March 2025 on the London-based label Dorado Records. Her third album has been well-received by European critics, with British columnist Gary Bushell lauding it as "atmospheric jazz and lugubrious neo-soul". In 2025 Åsman collaborated with British electronic artist Ikonika for a remix release of her nu-jazz track Did I go?

== Accolades ==
Year	Award	Category	Work	Result	Ref.
2024	Swedish Grammys	Best Jazz	Be Free	Nominated	
