= No Illusions =

Studio album by SULK
- Released: 15 April 2016
- Recorded: Big Jelly Studios, Ramsgate, Kent
- Genre: Psychedelic rock, shoegazing
- Label: Perfect Sound Forever
- Producer: Jonas Verwijnen

SULK chronology
Graceless (2013)	No Illusions (2016)

Singles from No Illusions
- 1. "Black Infinity (Upside Down)" Released: 18 September 2015; 2. "The Tape Of You" Released: 3 February 2016; 3. "The Only Faith Is Love" Released: 11 April 2016; 4. "No Illusions" Released: 15 September 2016

Professional ratings
Review scores
Source	Rating
God Is In The TV	8/10 stars
ReadJunk.com	4.5/5 stars
MusicOMH	3.5/5 stars
Louder Than War	7/10 stars

No Illusions is the second studio album by British psychedelic rock/shoegaze band SULK, released on 15 April 2016 on Perfect Sound Forever.

== Track listing ==
1. Black Infinity (Upside Down)
2. The Only Faith Is Love
3. No Illusions
4. Drifting
5. One Day
6. Past Paradise
7. Queen Supreme
8. Love Can't Save You Now
9. The Tape Of You
10. Another Man Fades Dawn
