= Shocking Pinks =

New Zealand shoegaze band

- Origin: Christchurch, New Zealand
- Genres: Indie; electronic; shoegaze
- Years active: 2002–present
- Labels: Pinacolada; Stars & Letters; DFA; Flying Nun; Geertruida
- Members: Nick Harte
- Past members: Tim McDonald; Herb Palmer
- Website: www.shockingpinks.com

Shocking Pinks is a musical project by New Zealand singer-songwriter and multi-instrumentalist Nick Harte.

== History ==
Founded in Christchurch, New Zealand, Nick Harte has played in many New Zealand bands such as the CM Ensemble, The Incisions, Montessouri, Laudanum, Palace of Wisdom, Luxor Dance Ensemble, Hiatus, Black Albino, Mary Boone, The Aesthetics, Urinator, Solaa, The Brunettes, Pig Out, DOG Power and Into the Void. He currently writes and performs with Moider Mother, Mercedes Cambridge, Adrenochrome Babies and Aotearoa Snuff Jazz Ensemble. As a producer Harte has recorded demos for Die! Die! Die!, Street Chant and Not So Experimental.

Harte, Tim McDonald and others performed a Shocking Pinks gig at the Media Club in their hometown of Christchurch in December, 2003, which was attended by Tim Baird who ran local label Pinacolada Record. Baird subsequently funded and released the original version of the Shocking Pinks' debut album 'Dance the Dance Electric' on 14 February 2004. This release featured a full-band lineup and introduced Harte's sound, which nodded to the sound of classic New Zealand bands such as The Gordons, Snapper and The Garbage & the Flowers, as well as My Bloody Valentine's shoegaze sounds, and a budding dance-punk scene. The album earned strong reviews, including an 8.2 score on Pitchfork Media. In the wake of this success, international labels became interested (including James Murphy of DFA Records who would later work with the band). The debut album was later reissued on vinyl by Dutch record label Geertruida and New Zealand record label A Low Hum in 2015. The Shocking Pinks then signed to the legendary New Zealand imprint Flying Nun Records and released two further albums in 2005, Mathematical Warfare and Infinity Land, which Harte wrote and performed on his own. DFA Records signed Harte and released a series of limited-edition singles, which included remixes by The Glimmers, Deerhunter, Eluvium, and Arkitype, before issuing the self-titled album, Shocking Pinks, in the autumn of 2007 —largely a remastered compilation of songs from Mathematical Warfare and Infinity Land.

=== Signing to Stars & Letters and Guilt Mirrors ===
In November 2013 Shocking Pinks signed to Brooklyn label, Stars & Letters Records, and announced the release of a new triple album called Guilt Mirrors. The digital trilogy released world-wide on 18 February 2014 and a limited edition vinyl release is due 15 April 2014. The first single "Not Gambling" was premiered via Pitchfork Media on 13 November 2013. The Pitchfork news item also included the full track-listing of the upcoming "Guilt Mirrors" album. The follow-up single "What's Up With That Girl?" premiered 11 December 2013, via Dazed & Confused. A third single "St Louis", featuring visual artist Gemma Syme on vocals, premiered via Pitchfork on 13 January 2014.

=== Performance line-up ===
The Shocking Pinks gigging lineup has featured a large number of local New Zealand musicians over the years, including members of New Zealand bands such as Borrowed Cassettes, Secret Knives, The Brunettes, The D4, Leper Ballet, Pig Out, The Enright House, and the Tiger Tones.

== Discography ==
=== Albums ===
- Dance the Dance Electric (2004 - Pinacolada Records)
- Mathematical Warfare (2005 - Flying Nun Records)
- Infinity Land (2005 - Flying Nun Records)
- Shocking Pinks (17 September 2007 - DFA Records)
- Guilt Mirrors (Digital trilogy 18 February 2014 - Stars & Letters Records)
- Guilt Mirrors (Limited edition 12" vinyl 15 April 2014 - Stars & Letters Records)
- Dance the Dance Electric 12" repress + 9 digital bonus unreleased tracks (2015 - A Low Hum / Spiral Jetta recordings / EDILS recordings / Geertruida)

=== Singles ===
- "Smoke Screen" (The Glimmers remix and Edit) (12") (11 June 2007 · DFA Records)
- "This Aching Deal"/"August 3rd" (Arkitype Remix) (7") (6 August 2007 · DFA Records)
- "Victims"/"April/May" (7") (20 August 2007 · DFA Records)
- "The Narrator"/"Dressed to Please" (7") (3 September 2007 · DFA Records)
- "End of the World" (7", 12", CD) (15 October 2007 · DFA Records)
- "Emily" (3 March 2008 · DFA Records)
- "Not Gambling" (13 November 2013 · Stars & Letters Records)
- "What's Up With That Girl?" (11 December 2013 · Stars & Letters Records)
- "St Louis [ft. Gemma Syme]" (13 January 2014 · Stars & Letters Records)
