= Shocking Pinks (album) =

Studio album by Shocking Pinks
- Released: September 17, 2007; September 25, 2007 US
- Genre: Indie rock, alternative rock, electronica, lo-fi
- Length: 45:00
- Label: DFA Records
- Producer: The DFA

Shocking Pinks chronology
Infinity Land (2005)	Shocking Pinks (2007)

Professional ratings
Review scores
Source	Rating
AllMusic	3.5/5 stars
Drowned in Sound	8/10
LAist	Positive
Pitchfork Media	8.3/10

Shocking Pinks is an eponymously titled album by the Shocking Pinks. It is a remastered merging of the band's two previous records, Mathematical Warfare and Infinity Land, which were originally released on New Zealand record label Flying Nun Records.

== Track listing ==
1. "Wake Up"
2. "This Aching Deal"
3. "How Am I Not Myself?"
4. "Second Hand Girl"
5. "End of the World"
6. "The Narrator"
7. "Yes! No!"
8. "Emily"
9. "Blonde Haired Girl"
10. "Victims"
11. "Girl on the Northern Line"
12. "I Want U Back"
13. "SmokeScreen"
14. "Jealousy"
15. "Cutout"
16. "23"
17. "You Can Make Me Feel Bad"
