= Stuck on Nothing =

Studio album by Free Energy
- Released: March 9, 2010 (digitally)
- Genres: Rock, power pop, indie rock
- Length: 44:09
- Label: DFA
- Producer: James Murphy

Free Energy chronology
Stuck on Nothing (2010)	Love Sign (2013)

Singles from Stuck On Nothing
- 1. "Free Energy" Released: August 10, 2009; 2. "Bang Pop" Released: August 26, 2010

Professional ratings
Review scores
Source	Rating
Rockfeedback	3/5 stars
The Arts Section	(Positive)
Pitchfork Media	(8.1/10)
Popmatters	(8/10)
War on Pop	8/10 stars
Tiny Mix Tapes	4/5 stars
AllMusic	4/5 stars

Stuck on Nothing is the debut studio album by Philadelphia based power pop group Free Energy. It was released on May 4, 2010, on DFA Records. The album was produced by LCD Soundsystem producer James Murphy.

== Release ==
The album was released digitally on March 9, 2010, and physically on May 4, 2010. The first single was "Bang Pop".

== Track listing ==
No.	Title	Length
1.	"Free Energy"	4:40
2.	"Dream City"	3:19
3.	"Bang Pop"	3:39
4.	"All I Know"	4:21
5.	"Bad Stuff"	5:42
6.	"Dark Trance"	5:15
7.	"Young Hearts"	2:41
8.	"Light Love"	3:44
9.	"Hope Child"	4:22
10.	"Wild Winds"	6:26
