= Shaping the Soul =

Studio album by Ithilien
- Released: 17 February 2017
- Recorded: 2016
- Genre: Folk metal, metalcore, melodic death metal
- Length: 49:20
- Label: WormHoleDeath

Ithilien chronology
From Ashes to the Frozen Land (2013)	Shaping the Soul (2017)

Professional ratings
Review scores
Source	Rating
Silence Music Magazine	9/10

Shaping the Soul is the second studio album by Belgian folk metal band Ithilien. It was released via WormHoleDeath Records on 17 February 2017. A music video was released for the song "Edelweiss". The album shows the band mixing together folk metal and metalcore to make a sound referred to as "folkcore".

== Track listing ==
No.	Title	Length
1.	"Blindfolded"	4:39
2.	"Lies After Lies"	4:39
3.	"Shaping the Soul"	6:10
4.	"Walk Away"	8:01
5.	"If Only"	4:28
6.	"Emma" (instrumental)	1:46
7.	"Edelweiss"	4:20
8.	"Hopeless"	4:41
9.	"The Dive"	6:43
10.	"The Bear Dance" (instrumental)	3:53
Total length:		49:20

== Personnel ==
- Piere Ithilien – vocals, lead guitar, bouzouki
- Tuur Soete – rhythm guitar
- Benjamin Delbar – bass guitar
- Olivier Bogaert – keyboards
- Jerry Winkelmans – drums
- Hugo Bailly – bagpipe
- Sabrina Gelin – hurdy-gurdy
- Myrna Mens – violin
- Geoffroy Dell'Aria – bagpipes, whistles
