= Black City Lights =

Electronic band from New Zealand

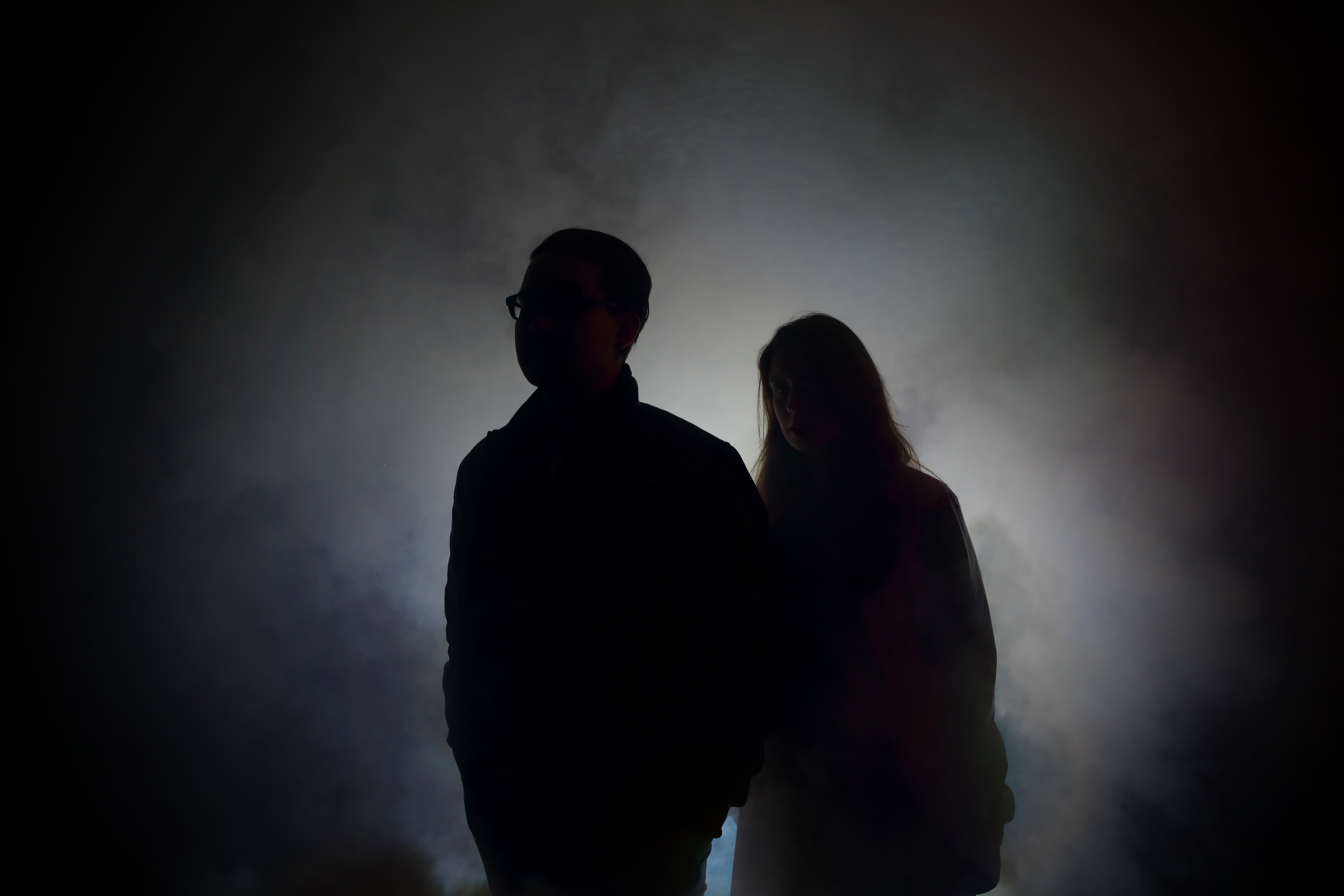

Background information
- Origin: Wellington, New Zealand
- Genres: Electronic
- Years active: 2010–2015
- Labels: Stars & Letters Records Cascine Sony Records
- Members: Julia Catherine Parr; Calum Robb
- Website: Official website

Black City Lights was an electronic band from Wellington, New Zealand. The band consisted of vocalist Julia Catherine Parr and producer Calum Robb and they were signed to Brooklyn label Stars & Letters Records. The band described themselves as alternatively "dark pop" and "cold wave".

In August 2013, the band released their début full-length album Another Life. The Corner gave the album an A+ and said that it "highlights Black City Lights' extraordinary ability to create intimacy between their music and their listeners: although the music is atmospheric and digital, it remains deeply sincere and personal."

They undertook a 10-week tour in the United States from September 2013.

In 2014 they went on tour with The Naked and Famous playing 17 shows around Europe.

On 18 February 2015, the band announced via their Facebook page that they had "come to the mutual decision" to go their separate ways and "end Black City Lights".

In their short term of playing shows, they supported bands/artists like Grimes, Baths, Cold Cave, Lorde, Daedalus, Future Islands, and many more.

== Discography ==
- Sky Ship (November 2011)
- Parallels EP (March 2012)
- RMXS EP (November 2012)
- Another Life (August 2013)
- Lost & Found (September 2018)
- I Wanna Be Adored (October 2022)
