= Ikonika =

- Born: Sara Abdel-Hamid; 1 June 1984 (age 42)
- Origin: Hounslow, London, England
- Genres: Bass music, dubstep, UK garage
- Years active: 2008–present
- Labels: Hyperdub; Planet Mu

Sara Abdel-Hamid (born 01 June 1984), better known as Ikonika, is an electronic musician, producer, DJ and singer often associated with Hyperdub Records and London's Rinse FM.

Their (Note: This article follows the lead of Ikonika's Instagram page and other sources in using they/them pronouns.) debut 12", "Please/Simulacrum" was released in 2008 on Hyperdub.

Their debut album, Contact, Love, Want, Have was released on Hyperdub on 6 April 2010. In 2025 Ikonika collaborated with Swedish experimental jazz artist Ebba Åsman for a remix release of her nu-jazz track Did I go?

== Personal life ==
Ikonika’s father is Egyptian and their mother is Filipino, Ikonika is non-binary.

== Discography ==
=== Albums ===
- Contact, Love, Want, Have (2010)
- Aerotropolis (2013)
- Distractions (2017)
- The Library Album (2018)
- SAD (2025)

=== EPs ===
- Edits EP (2010)
- I Make Lists EP (2012)
- Position EP (2014)
- Hollow EP (2020)
- Bodies EP (2020)

=== Singles ===
- "Idiot" (2010)
- "Dckhdbtch" (2010)
- "Smuck" (2009)
- "Millie" / "Direct"(2008)
- "Please" / "Simulacrum" (2008)
- "Sahara Michael" / "Fish" (2009)

=== Compilation appearances ===
- Unclassified ("World on Mute")
