= Aerotropolis (album) =

Studio album by Ikonika
- Released: 30 July 2013
- Genre: Electronic
- Length: 47:30
- Label: Hyperdub

Ikonika chronology
| Contact, Love, Want, Have (2010) | Aerotropolis (2013) | Distractions (2017) |

Singles from Aerotropolis
- 1. "Beach Mode (Keep It Simple)" Released: July 8, 2013

Professional ratings
Aggregate scores
| Source | Rating |
|---|---|
| Metacritic | 74/100 |
Review scores
| Source | Rating |
| Allmusic | 4/5 stars |
| Clash | 8/10 |
| Drowned in Sound | 7/10 |
| Exclaim! | 6/10 |
| NME | 8/10 |

Aerotropolis is the second studio album by electro-musician Ikonika. It was released in July 2013 under Hyperdub.

== Track listing ==
| No. | Title | Length |
|---|---|---|
| 1. | "Mise En Place" | 1:36 |
| 2. | "Beach Mode (Keep It Simple)" | 4:02 |
| 3. | "Mr. Cake" | 4:04 |
| 4. | "Practice Beats" | 0:48 |
| 5. | "Eternal Mode" | 4:45 |
| 6. | "Completion V.3" | 2:13 |
| 7. | "Manchego" | 3:29 |
| 8. | "Let A Smile Be" | 4:51 |
| 9. | "Lights Are Forever" | 4:25 |
| 10. | "Mega Church" | 4:25 |
| 11. | "Cryo" | 3:00 |
| 12. | "Backhand Winners" | 3:47 |
| 13. | "You Won't Find It There" |
| 14. | "Zen Sizzle" | 4:04 |
