= Tesla Boy =

Russian synthpop band

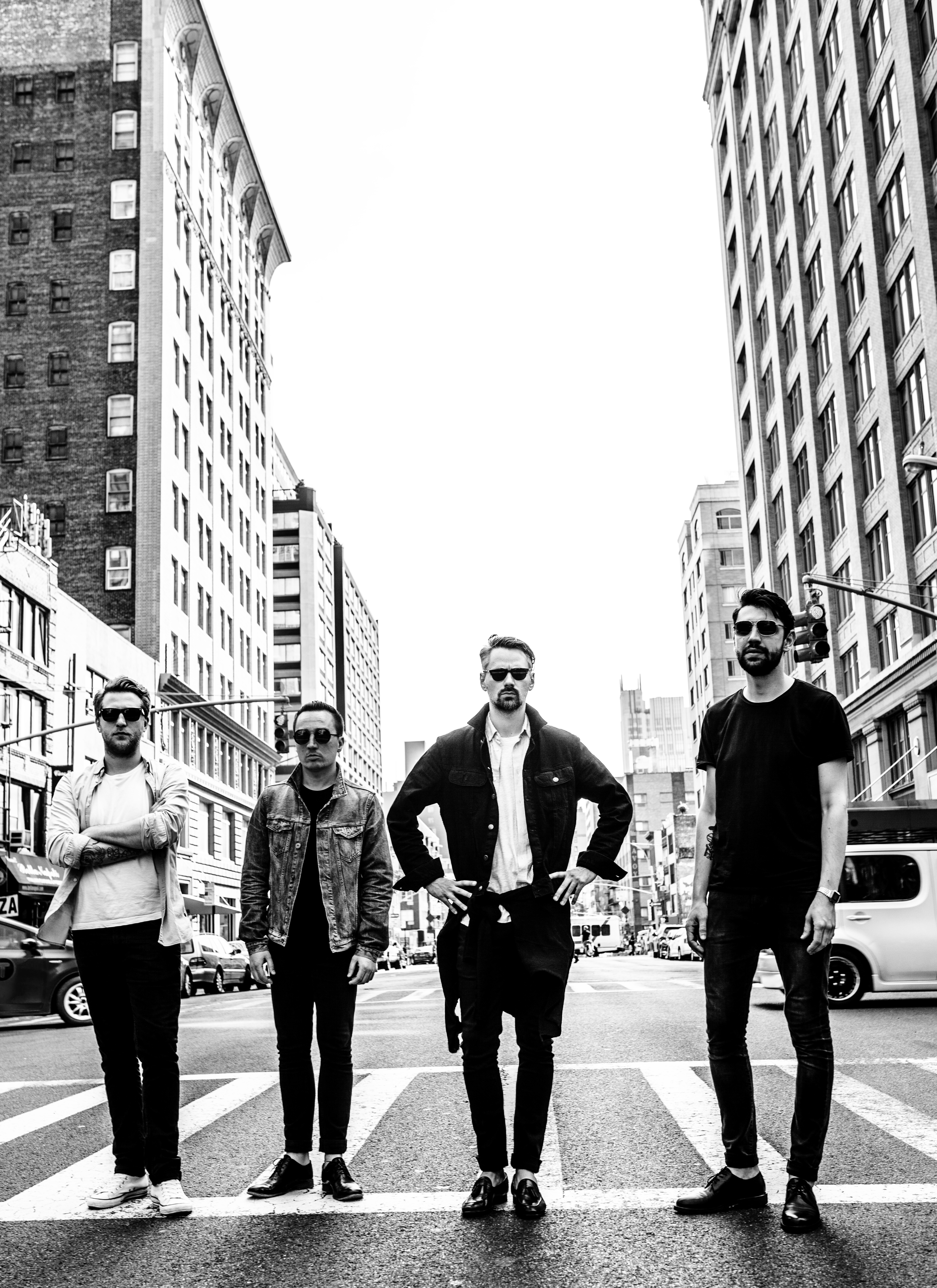

Background information
- Origin: Moscow, Russia
- Genres: Synthpop; electropop; nu-disco; new wave; Hi-NRG
- Years active: 2008–present
- Labels: Mullet [2008–2012]; Gorby Reagan [2012–present]
- Members: Anton Sevidov; Peter Dolsky; Ilya Kazantsev; Kirill Glezin
- Past members: Mike Studnitsyn; Stan Astakhov; Leo Zatagin; Dmitry Midborn; Konstantin Pokhvalin; Boris Lifshits; Igor Gribov; Igor Ten; Roman Nochevnyy
- Website: www.teslaboy.com

Tesla Boy is a Russian synthpop band formed in 2008 by sound producer, songwriter and musician Anton Sevidov.

== History ==
From an early age, Anton Sevidov learned music through his father's old vinyl collection that included Ray Charles, Prince, Stevie Wonder and Blondie.

The activity of the band began from the recording and spreading online the demo consisting of five tracks, which were released as "The Tesla Boy EP" later.

Mullet Records, a British record label, suggested to release a mini album with five tracks. "The Tesla Boy EP" uploaded in winter, 2009, official release was in September, and later autumn the album of remixes was dropped.

In 2010, Tesla Boy released a new album Modern Thrills. There was a presentation of it in club Strelka. The band was in the line-up of Afisha's Picnic again, also Tesla Boy had a show on EXIT festival, in Serbia with Midnight Juggernauts. Then the band had their first concert tour in Barcelona, Spain. By the end of 2010, Tesla Boy had a concert in Tromsø Norway, festival Insomnia.

In 2011, Tesla Boy had their tour in Scandinavia (Sweden and Finland) and released the song "In your Eyes" under the French label Kitsuné.

In 2012, Tesla Boy had a concert tour in New York, US, they gave a show at Webster Hall and at Full Moon festival.

In December 2012, the band presented maxi-single "Split", which included two new songs "Another light", "Split" and remixes for "The Myriads", "Pioneerball" and "SoundSAM". Martin Dubka, an English sound producer helped Tesla Boy with the new tracks. Also at the same time, the band released their new video for a song "Split". It was directed in New York, in September 2012 by the Andrey Krauzov.

In March 2013, the single "1991" was dropped. On 21 May, Tesla Boy presented their new album "The Universe Made of Darkness". It came to the ITunes top in Russia, US, Mexico and Europe. There were three shows in Moscow, St. Petersburg and Kyiv dedicated to the album and more than 15 thousands of fans visited those shows. Band went on tour to Mexico twice in a year and the big tour to the US in September. In summer 2013 Tesla Boy released a new video for "Undetected" presented on website of Jay-Z.

In 2015 Tesla Boy released single "Nothing". By the end of the year Tesla Boy had a little concert tour in four USA towns: Los Angeles, San-Francisco, Portland and Seattle. The new program from the band was presented on 20 March in 2016 in Gogol Centre. At the same time Tesla Boy released a video for "Nothing", which was put in the SXSW (Austin, Texas) and Berlin Music Video Awards festival programs.

In summer 2016 the band dropped their new EP — "Moses" with five songs on it, and moreover, they presented a new clip "Circles" (director Ryan Patrick).

There was a premiere of the single "Compromise" from the new album "Remedy" on 7 September.

== Discography ==
=== Studio albums ===
- Modern Thrills (2010)
- The Universe Made of Darkness (2013)
- Moses (2016)
- Remedy (2018)
- Андропов (2020)

=== Singles ===
Year	Title	Album
2009	The Tesla Boy EP	Extended plays
2009	The Tesla Boy EP Remixed	Extended plays
2009	Electric Lady	Modern Thrills
2010	Thinking of You	Modern Thrills
2010	Liberating Soul	Modern Thrills
2011	Rebecca	Modern Thrills
2012	Fantasy	The Universe Made of Darkness
2012	SPLIT	The Universe Made of Darkness
2013	1991	The Universe Made of Darkness
2013	Undetected	The Universe Made of Darkness
2016	Nothing	Nothing
2016	Circles	Moses
2018	Compromise	Remedy
2019	Холод уйдет	Андропов

=== Music videos ===
Year	Title	Album			
2009	Electric Lady	Modern Thrills			
2010	Thinking of You	Modern Thrills			
2011	Rebecca	Modern Thrills			
2012	Fantasy	The Universe Made of Darkness			
2012	Split	The Universe Made of Darkness			
2012	Another Light	Split			
2013	Broken Doll	The Universe Made of Darkness	2014	Keyboards & Synths	Keyboards & Synths
2016	Nothing	Nothing			
2016	Circles	Moses			
2018	Compromise	Remedy			
2020	Прогулка	Прогулка			

== Musicians ==
Anton Sevidov — vocal, keyboards, sound production (2008–present)
Peter Dolsky — bass, keyboards (2018–present)
Ilya Kazantsev — percussion (2018–present)
Kirill Glezin — drums (2019–present)

Dmitry Midborn – bass (2008–2012)
Konstantin Poko Cox Pokhvalin – guitar, back vocals (2010–2012)
Boris Lifshits – drums (2008–2010)
Leo Zatagin – bass (2012–2018)
Stan "Pioneerball" Astakhov – guitar, keyboards (2013–2018)
Mike Studnitsyn — drums, back vocals (2010–2019)
Igor Gribov — guitar (2018–2019)
Igor Ten — sax (2018–2019)
Roman Nochevnyy — guitar (2019)

== In popular culture ==
Tesla Boy's song "Spirit of the Night" was featured in Forza Horizon's in-game radio station "Horizon Pulse".
