= Stars & Letters Records =

Stars & Letters Records is an independent record label based in Brooklyn, New York, and founded by Mark Roberts, an electronic musician formerly known as The Enright House and currently as We Are Temporary. Stars & Letters Records was set up with the purpose of "releasing and developing intelligent, emerging, electronic, and vocal-driven artists from all across the world, including New Zealand, Australia, England, and the United States". The label is best known for releasing Shocking Pinks' Guilt Mirrors and has released material by Black City Lights, We Are Temporary, Ruane Maurice and Empathy Test.
