= From Ashes to the Frozen Land =

Studio album by Ithilien
- Released: 9 December 2013
- Recorded: 2013
- Genre: Pagan metal, black metal, folk metal, melodic death metal
- Length: 60:33
- Label: Mighty Music

Ithilien chronology
From Ashes to the Frozen Land (2013)	Shaping the Soul (2017)

Professional ratings
Review scores
Source	Rating
Metal.de	6/10
Musik Reviews	8/15
Powermetal.de	8/10
Rock Hard	5.5/10

From Ashes to the Frozen Land is the debut studio album by Belgian folk metal band Ithilien. It was released via Mighty Music on 9 December 2013.

== Track listing ==
No.	Title	Length
1.	"Battle Cry" (instrumental)	1:39
2.	"Unleashed"	5:28
3.	"Rebirth"	5:16
4.	"Sealed Destiny" (instrumental)	4:15
5.	"Through Wind and Snow"	6:15
6.	"Reckless Child"	7:01
7.	"Drinkin' Song"	4:28
8.	"Mother of the Night"	4:51
9.	"Stare into the Deep"	4:25
10.	"Everlasting Dawn"	5:55
11.	"A World Undone"	5:19
12.	"Northern Light" (instrumental)	4:41
Total length:		60:33

== Personnel ==
- Piere Ithilien – vocals, guitars
- Benjamin Delbar – bass
- Olivier Bogaert – keyboards
- Jerry Winkelmans – drums
- Geoffroy Dell'Aria – bagpipes, whistles
