= Money (band) =

Band

MONEY
- Origin: Manchester, England
- Genres: Dream pop, alternative rock, indie rock
- Years active: 2011–2016
- Labels: Bella Union, SWAYS, Almost Musique, PIAS Recordings
- Past members: Scott Beaman; Jamie Lee; Charlie Cocksedge; Billy Byron; Nick Delap

MONEY were an English alternative rock band, formed in Manchester in 2011 by Jamie Lee, Charlie Cocksedge, Billy Byron and Scott Beaman.

== History ==
Having formed in Manchester in 2011, MONEY is named after money, the medium of exchange. The band started out playing shows in venues such as Salford's Sacred Trinity Church and ‘The Bunker', a former factory near Strangeways prison and home to the independent label SWAYS, who released the band’s debut 7" single, "Who’s Going to Love You Now" / "Goodnight London" in January 2012. They followed that with ‘So Long (God is Dead)’, released on the French label Almost Musique. Having been tracked down by Simon Raymonde, the band subsequently signed to Bella Union, headlining the label's Christmas party at the Union Chapel in London in December 2012 before taking to the studio to record their debut album.

The band’s first single with Bella Union, "Bluebell Fields"', was released in June 2013, and shortly afterwards they announced their self-produced debut album, The Shadow of Heaven, which was released on 26 August 2013.

The band played several major UK and European festivals throughout the summer of 2013, as well as their first UK headline tour in June of that year.

In July 2013, the band unveiled the video to their new single, "Hold Me Forever"'. The video was the directorial debut of actor Cillian Murphy, featured dancers from the English National Ballet and was filmed at locations including The Old Vic Theatre in London.

Following positive reviews for their debut album, the band embarked on another headline UK tour in November 2013 and with their London show at the Shapes in Hackney having sold out, MONEY announced a headline London show at Heaven in February 2014.

In March 2014, the band played as support act to Wild Beasts across Europe.

The Shadow of Heaven was released in the United States and Canada on 6 May 2014 via Bella Union / PIAS. The band toured the US in September 2014, playing the Mercury Lounge and Glasslands in New York, and The Echo in Los Angeles. Shortly afterwards, they announced a tour of the UK for October 2014.

Their second album Suicide Songs was released on 29 January 2016 via Bella Union. It has received positive reviews and currently has 78 on Metacritic.

== Discography ==
=== Studio albums ===
- The Shadow of Heaven (26 August 2013, Bella Union)
- Suicide Songs (29 January 2016, Bella Union)

=== Singles ===
- Who’s Going To Love You Now / Goodnight London (2012, SWAYS Records)
- So Long (God is Dead) (2012, Almost Musique)
- Bluebell Fields (June 2013, Bella Union)
- Hold Me Forever (July 2013, Bella Union)
- You Look Like A Sad Painting On Both Sides Of The Sky (2015, Bella Union)
- I'll Be The Night (2015, Bella Union)
