= Love Sign (album) =

Studio album by Free Energy
- Released: January 15, 2013
- Genre: Pop, rock
- Length: 38:21
- Label: Free Energy
- Producer: John Agnello

Free Energy chronology
Stuck on Nothing (2010)	Love Sign (2013)

Singles from Love Sign
- 1. "Electric Fever" Released: March 5, 2012; 2. "Dance All Night" Released: October 9, 2012; 3. "Girls Want Rock" Released: January 3, 2013

Professional ratings
Aggregate scores
Source	Rating
Metacritic	67/100
Review scores
Source	Rating
Allmusic	3/5 stars
The A.V. Club	B
Pitchfork Media	3.6/10
Popmatters	5/10

Love Sign is the second and final studio album by rock band Free Energy. It was released in January 2013 on the group's own label. The album was produced by John Agnello.

== Track list ==
No.	Title	Length
1.	"Electric Fever"	3:49
2.	"Girls Want Rock"	3:14
3.	"Dance All Night"	5:15
4.	"Hey Tonight"	3:26
5.	"Hold You Close"	2:48
6.	"Backscratcher"	4:23
7.	"Hangin"	3:34
8.	"Street Survivor"	4:24
9.	"True Love"	3:18
10.	"Time Rolls On"	4:10
