= Sulk (British band) =

English psychedelic rock/shoegaze band

SULK
- SULK performing in Sala Upload, Barcelona in 2016

Background information
- Origin: London, England
- Genres: Psychedelic rock, shoegaze
- Years active: 2011–2018
- Labels: Perfect Sound Forever
- Members: Jon Sutcliffe; Tomas Kubowicz; Andrew Needle; Jakub Starzyński; Lewis Jones
- Past members: Bhairav Gupta

SULK were an English psychedelic rock/shoegaze band based in London.

== History ==
The group was formed in 2011 in London by Jon Sutcliffe (vocals), Tomas Kubowicz (lead guitar) and Andrew Needle (rhythm guitar). The line-up was later completed by Jakub Starzyński (bass guitar) and Bhairav Gupta (drums).

The band's debut single, "Wishes", was recorded and produced by Suede, Pulp and White Lies collaborator Ed Buller at ICP Studios in Belgium. Released in August 2011 on Perfect Sound Forever, the single was mentioned in NME's "Radar Tip Of The Day" by Matt Wilkinson, This Is Fake DIY's single review by Chelsea Cochrane and Killing Moon Limited's "Track Of The Day". The track was also played by Steve Lamacq on BBC Radio 6, Clint Boon on XFM and John Richards on KEXP.

Their second single, "Back In Bloom", also produced by Ed Buller, was released in November 2011, again on Perfect Sound Forever. The song was featured in "The Barometer" by John Hall in The Independent and in The Fly by Harriet Gibsone. Huw Stephens at BBC Radio 1, Tom Robinson at BBC Radio 6 and John Richards at KEXP played the track on their shows. They were also mentioned as one of "15 Music Artists Ready for Their Close-Up in 2012" in The Huffington Post.

The band played several shows in 2012 across the UK, including being the main support for The Dandy Warhols at the Manchester Academy 2.

In summer 2012 Bhairav Gupta left the band and was replaced by Lewis Jones on drums.

The group went back to the studio to continue to work on their debut album, which already had been recorded and produced by Ed Buller. This time they collaborated with Marc Waterman, who has previously worked with acts like Ride, Elastica and Swervedriver. The album was later mixed by Jonas Verwijnen and Antti Joas at Kaiku Studios in Berlin.

In December 2012 the band announced that the album would be called Graceless on their Facebook page. The release date was set for 15 April 2013.

Their third single, "Flowers", was released in April 2013 on Perfect Sound Forever. The song was featured on Soccer AM and in Wonderland Magazine as a free exclusive download. The video was premiered in Clash Magazine. Frank Skinner played the track on his show on Absolute Radio.

The band's fourth single, "The Big Blue", was released in May 2013 on Perfect Sound Forever. The single was mentioned by Pitchfork and Time Out (magazine). The track was also played by Gary Crowley on BBC Radio London.

In October 2013 the band announced that they would be supporting Happy Mondays on their "Bummed" 25th Anniversary Tour.

In April 2014 the band began to work on their second album, which was expected to be released in 2015.

The band released a new song in anticipation of their upcoming second album via Stereogum. "Black Infinity (Upside Down)" had its premiere on 18 September 2015.

In December 2015 it was announced that the band's second album would be called "No Illusions" and would be released on 15 April 2016 - exactly three years after the release of their debut album, Graceless.

Another song was released on 3 February 2016. Fred Perry Subculture premiered "The Tape Of You", saying "SULK have the songs and substance where it counts, and their second LP "No Illusions", will reportedly push their British indie-pop sound forward to win new ground."

"No Illusions" was premiered on 11 April 2016 by Stereogum.

The rest of the year was taken up by touring across Europe, which included shows in France, Spain, Switzerland, Italy and Germany but was marred by poor ticket sales.

On 3 February 2018, SULK announced the release of a new single via their social media.

The band has not released any new material or performed live since. Their label Perfect Sound Forever Records was dissolved on 1 February 2022.

== Discography ==
=== Album ===
- Graceless (15 April 2013)
- No Illusions (15 April 2016)

=== Singles ===
- Wishes (15 August 2011), Perfect Sound Forever
- Back In Bloom (21 November 2011), Perfect Sound Forever
- Flowers (1 April 2013), Perfect Sound Forever
- The Big Blue (20 May 2013), Perfect Sound Forever
- Black Infinity (Upside Down) (18 September 2015), Perfect Sound Forever
- The Tape Of You (3 February 2016), Perfect Sound Forever
- The Only Faith Is Love (11 April 2016), Perfect Sound Forever
- No Illusions (15 September 2016), Perfect Sound Forever
