= The Universe Made of Darkness =

Studio album by Tesla Boy
- Released: May 21, 2013
- Genre: Synth-pop, new wave
- Length: 50:31
- Label: Gorby Reagan Records
- Producer: Anton Sevidov

Tesla Boy chronology
Modern Thrills (2010)	The Universe Made of Darkness (2013)

Singles from The Universe Made of Darkness
- 1. "Fantasy" Released: 22 May 2012; 2. "SPLIT" Released: 15 December 2012; 3. "1991" Released: 18 March 2013; 4. "Undetected" Released: 20 August 2013; 5. "Broken Doll" Released: 26 November 2013

The Universe Made of Darkness is the second studio album by Tesla Boy.

== Release ==
The song "Undetected" was released on 20 August 2013 as the fourth single for The Universe Made of Darkness.

Tesla Boy shares the animated video for "Undetected" off their second album The Universe Made of Darkness. Directed by UK-based animator Noriko Okaku, the video premieres today on Jay-Z’s Life + Times and shows the inner illustrated workings of Tesla Boy's mind. Interview Noriko Okaku Russian magazine "Afisha":

I did not hear anything about Tesla Boy, until they themselves I never wrote: they say, we are a group of Russia, seen your work, not would you like for us to remove the clip? Music I liked her at once, so I quickly agreed. The group said that, because they like my taste, I can do what I want, that just in the video were the musicians themselves. And I, when I heard a song, immediately to the idea to do something abstract, play with some shapes and colors of the well and only had it with musicians connect. Say, the video looks like the splash MTV 90s? I this effect is not achieved, and it happened. I practiced a lot frame-by-frame animation, so it was all just took pictures of the band, their drawings and have animated on the computer. It took me two months, all this time I listened to the song Tesla Boy, I like them. But you know that I would never thought that this is a band from Russia. It rather seems that they are from the U.S. or some other country.

== Track listing ==
All tracks are written by Anton Sevidov, except where noted.

No.	Title	Length
1.	"Dream Machine"	4:49
2.	"M.C.H.T.E"	5:00
3.	"Invisible"	4:26
4.	"Broken Doll" (featuring Tyson of Unklejam)	4:43
5.	"Split"	4:24
6.	"Fantasy"	3:45
7.	"Saturn" (Interlude)	2:35
8.	"Undetected"	4:42
9.	"Stars"	4:40
10.	"Something Deep Inside" (Interlude)	2:02
11.	"Paraffin" (featuring Fritz Helder of Azari & III)	4:10
12.	"1991"	5:15
