= Graceless (Sulk album) =

Studio album by SULK
- Released: 15 April 2013
- Recorded: ICP Studios, Belgium; Gun Factory, London
- Genre: Psychedelic rock, shoegaze
- Length: 38:05
- Label: Perfect Sound Forever
- Producer: Ed Buller, Marc Waterman

SULK chronology
Graceless (2013)	No Illusions (2016)

Singles from Graceless
- 1. "Wishes" Released: 15 August 2011; 2. "Back In Bloom" Released: 21 November 2011; 3. "Flowers" Released: 1 April 2013; 4. "The Big Blue" Released: 20 May 2013

Professional ratings
Review scores
Source	Rating
The Fly	3.5/5 stars
45 Magazine	(favorable)
7 Bit Arcade	(favorable)
NME	6/10 stars
ShortList	(favorable)
Tellin' Tunes	7.5/10 stars
Hooting And Howling	10/10 stars
Digital Journal	9/10 stars
Planet Notion	(favorable)

Graceless is the debut album by British psychedelic rock/shoegaze band SULK, released on 15 April 2013 on Perfect Sound Forever.

== Track listing ==
1. Sleeping Beauty
2. Flowers
3. Diamonds in Ashes
4. The Big Blue
5. Marian Shrine
6. Back in Bloom
7. Wishes
8. Down
9. If You Wonder
10. End Time
