= The Shadow of Heaven =

Studio album by MONEY
- Released: 26 August 2013
- Recorded: 2012
- Genre: Dream pop, indie pop
- Length: 50:32
- Label: Bella Union

MONEY chronology
The Shadow of Heaven (2013)	Suicide Songs (2016)

Singles from The Shadow of Heaven
- 1. "Who's Going to Love You Now"; 2. "Goodnight London"; 3. "So Long (God Is Dead)"; 4. "Bluebell Fields"; 5. "Hold Me Forever"

The Shadow of Heaven is the debut studio album by Money. It was released by Bella Union on August 26, 2013.

== Reception ==
Professional ratings
Aggregate scores
Source	Rating
Metacritic	78/100
Review scores
Source	Rating
Clash	8/10
Drowned in Sound	9/10
The Guardian	4/5 stars
musicOMH	4/5 stars
Under the Radar	8.5/10 stars

The Shadow of Heaven received positive reviews from critics. On Metacritic, the album holds a score of 78/100 based on 13 reviews, indicating "generally favorable reviews".

== Track listing ==
The Shadow of Heaven
No.	Title	Length
1.	"So Long (God Is Dead)"	5:30
2.	"Who's Going to Love You Now"	4:07
3.	"Bluebell Fields"	4:40
4.	"Goodnight London"	7:02
5.	"Letter to Yesterday"	5:44
6.	"Hold Me Forever"	5:42
7.	"Cold Water"	4:16
8.	"The Cruelty of Godliness"	3:06
9.	"The Shadow of Heaven"	5:15
10.	"Black"	5:10
Total length:		50:32
