= Free Energy (band) =

American rock band

- Origin: Philadelphia, Pennsylvania, U.S.
- Genres: Rock, power pop, indie rock
- Years active: 2008–2016
- Labels: DFA Records, Free Energy Records
- Past members: Scott Wells; Evan Wells; Nicholas Shuminsky; Sheridan Fox; Geoff Bucknum; Patrick Stickles; Jesse Sparhawk; Paul Sprangers

Free Energy was an American rock band based in Philadelphia, Pennsylvania. Members included Scott Wells, Sheridan Fox, Evan Wells, and Nicholas Shuminsky.

== History ==
The Wells brothers and Sprangers are originally from Red Wing, Minnesota, where they first started playing together in the now-defunct indie rock band Hockey Night. Shuminsky, of St. Paul's Superhopper and Malachi Constant, joined Sprangers and the Wells brothers to form the band in the Fall of 2008. Critics have compared Free Energy's sound to 1970s rock acts like Journey and The Cars.

The band rose to prominence in March 2010 with the critically acclaimed release of their debut album Stuck on Nothing, produced by James Murphy of LCD Soundsystem. On March 17, Rolling Stone named Free Energy one of the best new bands of 2010. The band has also received high marks from Spin Magazine. On March 17, 2010, the band performed on the Late Show with David Letterman. The single "Bang Pop" was used on the pilot episode of sitcom Raising Hope. Free Energy toured heavily with Mates of State, Titus Andronicus, Hollerado, Foreign Born and The Postelles. They opened for Weezer during their Memories tour and performed on the Weezer Cruise in January 2012.

On March 6, 2012, the band released "Electric Fever", the first single from Love Sign. The song is heavily inspired by "You Ain't Seen Nothing Yet" by Bachman-Turner Overdrive.

On January 15, 2013, Free Energy self-released its second full-length studio album, Love Sign. The album was recorded with producer John Agnello.

Free Energy's final performance was at Clockenclap Festival in Hong Kong, 2013.

== Band members ==
- Scott Wells – lead guitar (2008–2016)
- Paul Sprangers – vocals (2008–2016)
- Evan Wells – bass (2008–2016)
- Jesse Sparhawk – rhythm guitar (2011)
- Nicholas Shuminsky – drums (2008–2016)
- Geoff Bucknum – rhythm guitar (2008–2011)
- Sheridan Fox – rhythm guitar (2011–2016)
- Patrick Stickles – rhythm guitar (2011)

== Discography ==
=== Albums ===
- Stuck on Nothing (2010) – US Heatseekers #38
- Love Sign (2013) – US Heatseekers #13

=== EPs ===
- Free Energy (EP) (2009)

=== Singles ===
- "Bang Pop" (2010)
- "Electric Fever" (2012)
