= Modern Thrills =

Studio album by Tesla Boy
- Released: May 31, 2010
- Genre: Electronic, synthpop, disco
- Length: 56:44
- Label: Mullet Records

Tesla Boy chronology
Modern Thrills (2010)	The Universe Made of Darkness (2013)

Singles from Modern Thrills
- 1. "Electric Lady" Released: 2009; 2. "Thinking of You" Released: 2010; 3. "Liberating Soul" Released: 2010; 4. "Rebecca" Released: 2011

Modern Thrills is the first studio album by Tesla Boy, first released on May 31, 2010.

== Reception ==
Professional ratings
Review scores
Source	Rating
The Line of Best Fit	(Recommended)
Bearded	(mixed)

Modern Thrills has received generally favorable reviews.

== Track listing ==
All tracks are written by Anton Sevidov and Dima Midborn, except where noted

No.	Title	Length
1.	"Electric Lady"	5:21
2.	"Synthetic Prince"	4:30
3.	"Rebecca"	4:14
4.	"Synchronizing"	5:57
5.	"Minsk-2"	5:31
6.	"Dark Street"	6:23
7.	"Liberating Soul"	6:03
8.	"Fire"	4:56
9.	"Make Believe Ballroom"	2:18
10.	"Thinking of You"	7:01
11.	"Speed of Light"	4:30

== Personnel ==
- Anton Sevidov – vocal, keyboards
- Dima Midborn – bass
- Poko Cox – guitar
- Mikhail Studnitsyn – drums
