= Ithilien (band) =

Belgian folk metal band

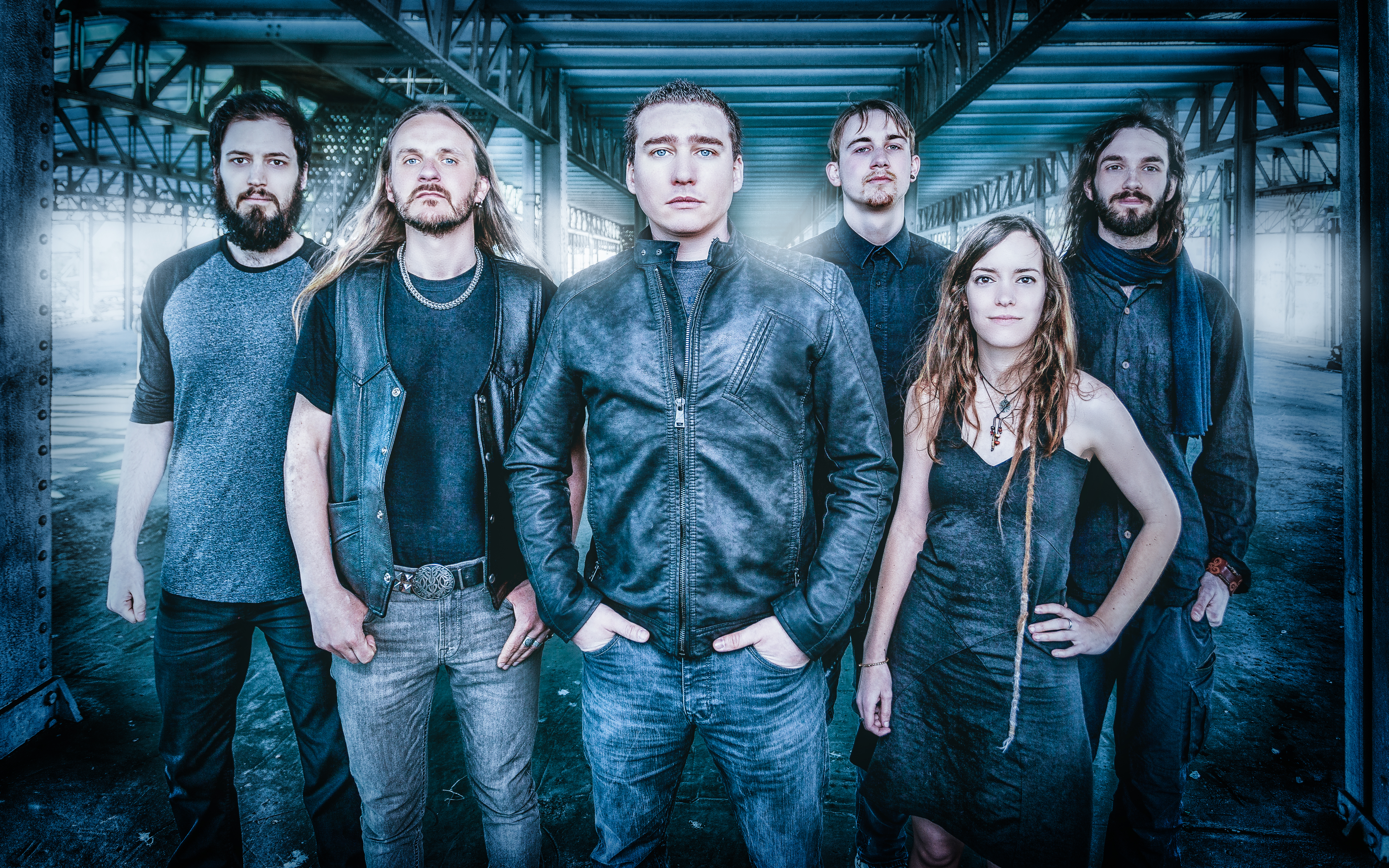

Background information
- Origin: Brussels, Belgium
- Genres: Folk metal; metalcore; melodic death metal; pagan metal; black metal (early)
- Years active: 2005–present (hiatus since 2018)
- Labels: Mighty Music; WormHoleDeath
- Members: Pierre Ithilien; Benjamin Delbar; Jerry Winkelmans; Tuur Soete; Sabrina Gelin; Myrna Mens; Hugo Bailly
- Website: www.ithilien.be

Ithilien is a Belgian folk metal band from Brussels using traditional folk instruments such as a hurdy gurdy, a bagpipe, a violin, a nyckelharpa, flutes and a bouzouki. They combine elements of metal (death/metalcore) and traditional folk music.

== History ==
=== Formation and early years (2005–2012) ===
Ithilien was formed in 2005 by Pierre Ithilien in Brussels. The name of the band means "Country of the Moon" in Sindarin, language constructed by the writer J. R. R. Tolkien. However, none of the contents of the songs, concepts and themes of the albums are related to the universe of The Lord of the Rings.

It was in 2011 that the band recorded its first official EP Tribute to the Fallen and the single "Endless Horizons". At that time, the style of the band was mainly melodic-death metal, although some folk aspects in the melodies were emerging.

Thereafter other members joined the guitarist/singer Pierre (the only remaining original member) : Benjamin Delbar in 2011, Jerry Winkelmans, Olivier Bogaert and finally Geoffroy Dell'Aria in 2012 (which through its instruments brought the folk sounds that are characteristic to Ithilien today). At that moment, they had a solid team ready to compose their first album.

=== From Ashes to the Frozen Land (2012–2016) ===
It is in 2012 that Ithilien established a stable line-up allowing the band to start from scratch and keep only its original name. On December 9, 2013, they released their first album From Ashes to the Frozen Land, signed with the Danish label Mighty Music and distributed throw Europe with Target Group.

The album is composed of songs that, one after the other, follows a storyline. The band describes this new opus as "One hour of a musical atmospheric journey of black, death and pagan metal describing all together a fantastic and epic story". This album evokes above all the strong emotions that men can feel during difficult moments, hereby addressing subjects such as loss, rebirth or perseverance.

Ithilien distinguishes itself from other metal bands by the presence of real folk instruments on stage as well as their albums recordings, but also by what the musicians wear live, resolutely of Viking inspiration (armor of leather, skins of beasts, make-up warriors, etc.).

Over time, other members were added such as Hugo Bailly to the bagpipes and Sabrina Gelin to the hurdy-gurdy, both in 2014. An even more privileged place is then made to the folkloric instruments within the band.

After being selected as one of the winners of the Loud Circuit contest, the band had the opportunity to play at the Botanique in Brussels in 2013. Ithilien played more than 80 concerts worldwide, including tours with the Swiss folk metal band Eluveitie, in Europe and Japan, and the Icelandic Viking/folk metal band Skálmöld in Europe.

=== Shaping the Soul (2016–present) ===
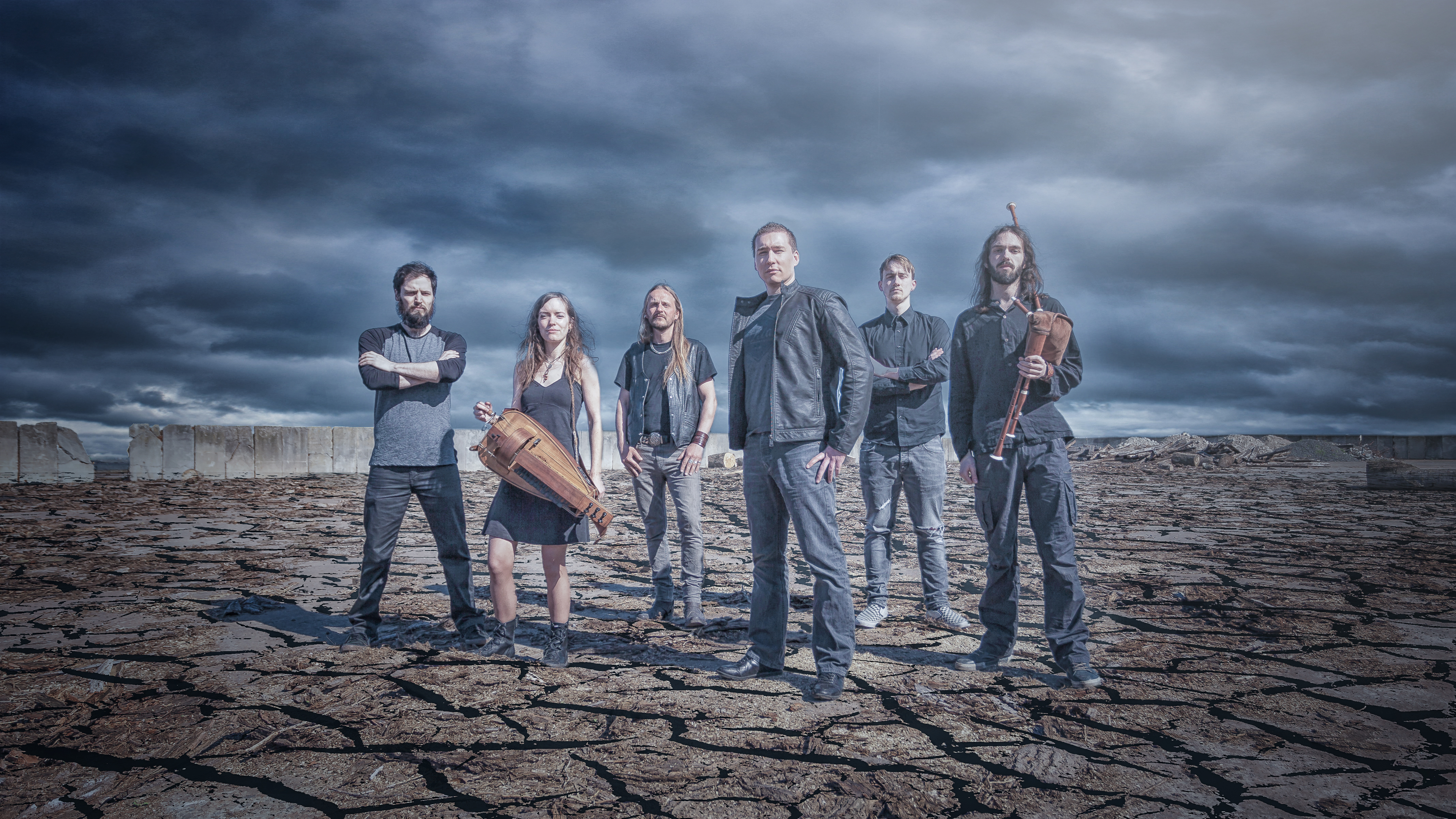
Ithilien in July 2016

In March 2016, the band released the song "Edelweiss" and announced their next album, Shaping the Soul. This new release is accompanied with a new collaboration with the Italian label WormHoleDeath.

In 2016, Olivier Bogaert and Geoffroy Dell'Aria left the band.

The first official music video from the album, "Blindfolded", appeared on January 9, 2017, showing the new line-up, completed with violinist Myrna Mens and guitarist Tuur Soete.

On February 17, 2017, Shaping the Soul was released in Europe followed by the other continents. Tour dates were then planned in various Belgian cities and abroad with the dutch folk metal act Heidevolk, but also with Ensiferum, Skyclad and many others.

The concept of this new opus is about the grief process. "It is through loss and pain that our soul is being shaped." According to Elisabeth Kübler-Ross, the mourning process is usually theorized in 5 stages: denial, anger, bargaining, depression and acceptance. It is these steps that form the red line of Ithilien's album.

Visually speaking, in 2016 the band abandoned the stage fantasy costumes to return to more conventional modern clothing.

In February 2018, a music video was released for the song "Edelweiss", and they started touring Japan in April. There is no known activity from the band since then.

== Musical style ==
At the beginning, Ithilien offers an epic mix between black metal and death metal, all influenced by traditional folk Celtic and Nordic music. This combination led to melodic folk metal.

It is in 2017, with the album Shaping the Soul, that the band evolves towards a style called "folkcore". It is a close combination of traditional folk music (played by Flemish bagpipes, hurdy-gurdy, tin and low whistles, violin, nykelharpa and bouzouki), and a more modern touch of metal using distorted vocals and heavy electric guitars riffs (death metal, metalcore).

== Members ==
=== Current members ===
- Pierre Ithilien– guitar, bouzouki, vocals (2005–present)
- Benjamin Delbar – bass (2011–present)
- Jerry Winkelmans – drums (2012–present)
- Sabrina Gelin – hurdy-gurdy, nykelharpa (2013–present)
- Hugo Bailly – bagpipes (2014–present)
- Myrna Mens – violin (2016–present)
- Tuur Soete – guitar (2016–present)

=== Former members ===
- Jonathan Lelubre – drums (2005–2009)
- Benoit Loffet – guitar (2005–2008)
- Thomas De Moor – bass (2005–2007)
- François Dambois – keyboard (2006–2008)
- Olmo Lipani – vocals (2007–2008)
- François Arnould – bass (2007–2008)
- Dave Conlon – bass (2008–2009)
- Anthony JG – guitar (2008–2009)
- Michel Debecq – drums (2010–2011)
- Charly Flémal – guitar (2010–2011)
- Sébastien Dupont – bass (2010–2011)
- Thomas Froes – drums (2011–2012)
- Thibault Lenclud – guitar (2011–2012)
- Olivier Bogaert – keyboard (2012–2016)
- Maxime Parmentier – guitar (2015–2016)
- Geoffroy Dell'Aria – bagpipes, whistles (2012–2016)

Timeline

== Discography ==
=== Albums ===
- From Ashes to the Frozen Land (2013)
- Shaping the Soul (2017)

=== EPs ===
- Tribute to the Fallen (2011)

=== Singles ===
- Endless Horizons (2011)
- Wacken Battle Single (2013)
