= Traditional Music of Notional Species Vol. I =

Studio album by Rashad Becker
- Released: 10 September 2013
- Genre: Electronic
- Length: 33:41
- Label: PAN

Rashad Becker chronology
Traditional Music of Notional Species Vol. I (2013)	Traditional Music of Notional Species Vol. II (2016)

Traditional Music of Notional Species Vol. I is the debut studio album by German mastering engineer and artist Rashad Becker. It was released on 10 September 2013 through PAN.

== Background ==
Rashad Becker is a German mastering engineer and artist. He has mastered and cut over a thousand records. Traditional Music of Notional Species Vol. I is his debut album as a recording artist. The album's artwork is designed by Bill Kouligas. After multiple delays, the album was released on 10 September 2013 through PAN.

It was followed by Traditional Music of Notional Species Vol. II (2016).

== Critical reception ==
Professional ratings
Review scores
Source	Rating
Fact	4/5 stars
Pitchfork	7.4/10
Resident Advisor	4/5
Tiny Mix Tapes	3.5/5 stars
XLR8R	8/10

Rory Gibb of The Quietus wrote, "It's a jarring listen at times but a spectacular one, and as a demonstration of the potential of electronic music to subvert the laws of our world and envisage a completely new one, it's unparalleled, making it one of PAN's best releases to date." Marc Masters of Pitchfork stated, "Everything on it is boldly legible, and though there are tons of sounds intersecting and overlapping, nothing is blurry." Steve Shaw of Fact called it "genuinely extraordinary; a bizarre, Gagaku-like court music for alien chamber orchestra." Ian Maleney of Resident Advisor commented that the album "serves as a timely reminder of the label's experimental roots."

=== Accolades ===
Year-end lists for Traditional Music of Notional Species Vol. I
Publication	List	Rank	Ref.
The Quietus	Quietus Albums of the Year 2013	15	
The Vinyl Factory	The Top 100 Vinyl Releases of 2013	8	
The Wire	Releases of the Year (2013 Rewind)	3	

== Track listing ==
Traditional Music of Notional Species Vol. I track listing
No.	Title	Length
1.	"Dances I"	4:20
2.	"Dances II"	4:26
3.	"Dances III"	4:12
4.	"Dances IV"	4:13
5.	"Themes I"	3:48
6.	"Themes II"	4:05
7.	"Themes III"	4:12
8.	"Themes IV"	4:25
Total length:		33:41

== Personnel ==
Credits adapted from liner notes.

- Rashad Becker – music
- Bill Kouligas – artwork
