= The Secretions =

- Origin: Sacramento, California, United States
- Genres: Punk rock Pop punk
- Years active: 1991-2016
- Labels: Springman, Silver Sprocket, Drool City
- Members: Danny Secretion; Mickie Rat; Paul Filthy
- Website: http://www.facebook.com/secretions/

The Secretions were an American punk rock band from Sacramento, California, United States. Formed in the year 1991, the band had released numerous albums and singles, and toured the US and internationally.

== History ==
Mickie Rat attended Sacramento State University where he met D.J. Willis (a guitarist with whom he worked on the college radio station) and a drummer named Dave Leon. They decided to form a band, naming it "The Secretions" based on a list of band names Willis kept on his fridge. Shortly after the decision to form the band, Willis died in a vehicular accident. Mickie Rat met Danny Secretion (who had worked on the radio station, but whom he had never met) at Willis's funeral, and recruited him as a guitarist. The original band lineup was Mickie Rat on bass, Dave Leon on drums, and Danny Secretion on guitar.

The band went through a number of lineup changes and various short-lived members through the early to late 1990s. Kevin Stockton joined as guitarist, replacing Morgan Giles. The lineup then stabilized for several years, with Danny Secretion on drums, Mickie Rat on bass, and Kevin Stockton on guitar. Stockton was replaced on guitar by Paul Filthy in 2005.

== Musical style and influences ==
The Secretions wrote songs on a range of subjects, including non-human love interests ("Zombie Girl", "Alien Girl", "She's A Robot/Boxcar II"), horror themes ("Fuckin' Zombies", "Cemetery Pogo"), Mexican wrestling ("Viva La Lucha Libre", "Tony Silva Rides The Bus"), touring and performing ("Double O Summer", "Mickie's On The Crapper"), and experiences of not fitting in ("I Still Think Cindy Crawford Is Ugly", "Freaks Like Us"). They did not have an overall theme or favorite subject, and said that they just wrote about whatever they felt like at the time.

The band cited Screeching Weasel, The Ramones, The Queers, Motörhead, and Rancid as their main influences.

== Tours, collaborations, and other projects ==
The Secretions released numerous albums and EPs, including split EPs and appearances on compilations. They have completed national USA tours with bands like The Teenage Harlets and Final Summation, and have shared the stage with Chixdiggit, Pansy Division, Luckie Strike, Link 80, Good Riddance, Marky Ramone, and The Crumbs. In 2006, the Secretions won a competition on Sacramento's KWOD radio station to play the Arco Arena with Papa Roach, Gnarls Barkley, and My Chemical Romance.

The Secretions have won local area music awards SAMMIES (Sacramento Area Music Awards) three consecutive times and were nominated to the local area music hall of fame. Danny Secretion toured as the drummer for the Groovie Ghoulies on their first North American tour with Screw 32 and The Queers, and is listed as a past member of the band on their Myspace page. He was the recording and touring guitarist for Kepi Ghoulie's first electric solo efforts. Danny currently plays guitar for the Knockoffs, guitar for The Moans, bass for Captain 9's & The Knickerbocker Trio, plays solo acoustic, and performs as his lounge singer alter-ego Gene Chowder. Mickie Rat briefly drummed for Sacramento band the Mallrats and played bass for Rat-o-Matic. He currently drums for Spitting Roses.

== Discography ==
- We Secrete You Suck (7”, 1997)
- Attention Deficit Disorderly (CD, 1999 Slap Happy Records)
- Contributing To The Delinquency Of Minors Split (Split with Sidekicks) (7", 2000 Slap Happy Records)
- 'Til Death (CD, 2001 Springman Records)
- Seven Inches (7” Split with the Sacramento’s Riff Randals, 2001)
- 'Til Death Do Us Party (Split with Groovie Ghoulies) (7", 2002 Springman Records)
- Coming To Save The World (CD, 2005 Springman Records)
- Rock N Roll Three-Way (Split with Ashtray and Final Summation)(CD, 2007)
- Faster Than The Speed Of Drunk (CD, 2007)
- Blast Off (7", 2007 Gearhead Records)
- GreasyHotMeatCheezy (CD, 2009)

== Compilations ==
- Holy Gobstoppers Bat Man!! Another Compilation maximumrocknroll Won't Like!! (CD, 1998 Slap Happy Records)
- 3 Chord Rocket Science (CD, 2002 Suckerpunch Records)
- Punk Rock Strike Vol 3: Third Strike (CD, 2002 Springman Records)
- The Rocky Horror Punk Rock Show (CD, 2003 Springman Records)
- Sacto Scene Report (CD, 2004 TKO Records)
- Save The Kids (CD, 2005 Arm The Pit)
- Backyard City Rockers 3 (CD, 2005 Smelvis Records)
- I Killed Punk Rock (CD, 2006 Bouncing Betty Records)
