= The Phenomenauts =

Science band from Oakland, California, US

- Origin: Oakland, California
- Genres: Psychobilly, punk rock, new wave, surf rock
- Years active: 2000–present
- Labels: Arlington Lab, Springman, Silver Sprocket
- Members: Leftenant AR-7; Major Jimmy Boom; Lunar Captain Ripley Clipse; Chief Engineer Atom Bomb
- Past members: Corporal JoeBot; Corporal JoeBot 2.0; Fritz M. Static; Captain Chreehos; Deck Chief Nick Wayzar; Professor Greg Arius; Chaos Agent Ion O'Clast; Angel Nova; Bart Applesauce
- Website: phenomenauts.com

The Phenomenauts are a musical band from Oakland, California, that combine several styles of music with a futuristic science fiction theme. Their sound uses elements from rock and roll, punk, glam, garage rock and new wave styles of music. They call their style "rocket roll".

The band is known for throwing sudden, unexpected shows at places where they are not invited. They often play in front of existing concerts where crowds have already gathered. They gained notoriety in 2003 for sneaking into the Warped Tour, following the tour in their own vehicle and performing at each stop for several weeks.

The Phenomenauts perform under a space and science fiction persona. Each band member uses a stage name and dress in uniform. Most of the band's songs revolve around science, space, robots, and the future. The band has even decorated their vehicles to match their theme. Their live shows often feature special effects like clouds of smoke or lasers, and they are known to shoot toilet paper into the crowd and set their drum cymbals on fire.

The Phenomenauts also use their music to promote science education and learning. They have played and promoted events such as the Bay Area Science Festival and the March for Science. In 2015 they released the album I'm With Neil, a tribute to astrophysicist Neil deGrasse Tyson and the public radio program Science Friday.

== History ==
=== Band formation and Rockets And Robots (2000–02) ===
The Phenomenauts were formed in 2000 in Oakland, California, which the band refers to as "Earth's capital". They were formed from the band Space Patrol, a 1980s cover band that played on homemade instruments. Space Patrol members included Commander Angel Nova, Corporal JoeBot, and Major Jimmy Boom. The trio added bass player Captain Chreehos and formed The Phenomenauts—a name which means "to pilot an unusual experience".

In 2002 The Phenomenauts released their first album, Rockets And Robots. It was self-published on their own label, Arlington Lab Recordings. The album was well received "by radio stations and audiences surrounding the Bay Area". It rose on the music charts on local college stations such as KSSU in Sacramento and KALX in Berkeley. Rockets and Robots was also reviewed favorably in local music publications; for instance, Zero Magazine wrote, "What separates this East Bay foursome from all the other bands of this type is their sense of humor and songwriting craft".

Band manager Colonel Reehotch explained that recording the first album was "a process [of] 'Delusional Exploration'. Rockets and Robots was an experiment to take the Phenomenauts rock show ... and translate it to your mind. So that if you had never seen the band before and listened to the album you could paint the picture of the show in your imagination".

Later in 2002 The Phenomenauts won two awards. They were chosen as California's Best Live Band by the East Bay Express, and called the Best Lifestyle Music artist by SF Weekly.

After touring to support their debut album, the band signed with Springman Records. "After a year of touring up and down the Bay ... Avi [the] owner of Springman Records ... saw us at the Gilman. He said, ‘You guys are something I want to be a part of’. ... It was one of our best ideas to work together". In the spring of 2003, Rockets and Robots was remastered and re-issued on Springman Records.

=== Expansion and mini-albums (2002–04) ===
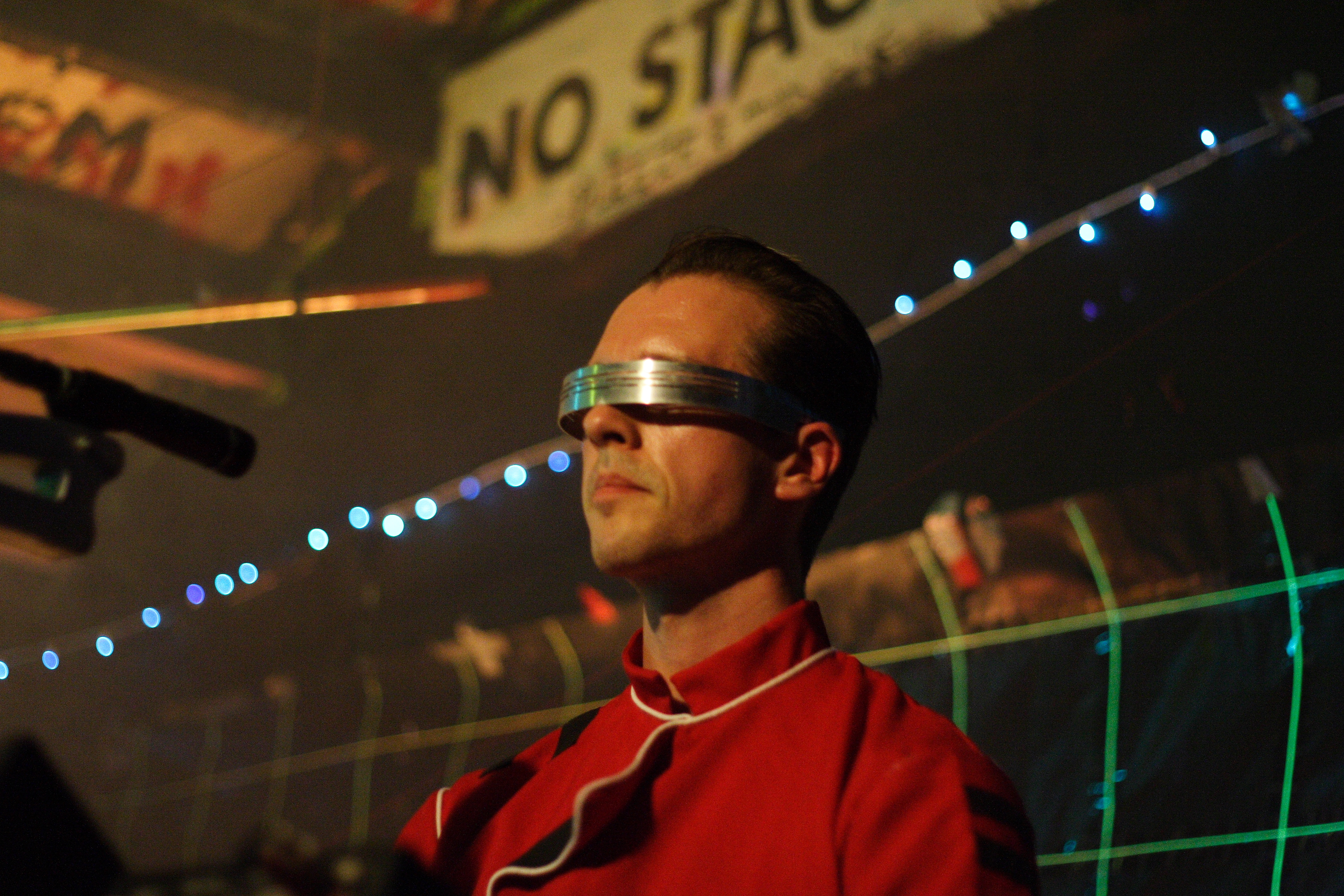
In 2002 the Phenomenauts added a fifth member, Professor Greg Arius, who played the synthesizer. This added an extra layer of sound to their music.

Leading up to their second full-length album The Phenomenauts released two smaller works. These releases, in turn, were preceded by the band adding a fifth member to their lineup—Professor Greg Arius playing synthesizer. This gave the group an "extra layer" and type of sound. Then in 2003 the band released Mission Transmission, a 7-inch vinyl containing two new songs. To celebrate The Phenomenauts went on their first European tour in November 2003 with fellow punk/rockabilly band Demented Are Go. This was followed by their second mini-album Pre-Entry in 2004. Pre-Entry had live versions of the two Transmission songs as well as three new ones.

=== Re-Entry (2004) ===
The Phenomenauts released their second full-length album Re-Entry later in 2004. "With the new record ... the band felt really comfortable about the vision and going into the studio. We didn't worry so much about [making] a movie this time as we did trying to capture the energy of the songs". Shortly after releasing Re-Entry, the Phenomenauts were a finalist for the "Not So Silent Night" concert held by San Francisco radio station Live 105.

Discussing their music-making process, the band noted that trying out songs live before they were recorded "enabled the band to sort through their best material, and eliminate any excess fat". While it had been two years since their previous album release, the band was "glad [they had] waited until [they] had enough 'A' material".

Both Pre-Entry and Re-Entry were engineered by Chris Dugan at Nu-Tone Studios, who later went on to win a Grammy as an audio engineer for Green Day. Through heavy touring and promotion the album charted at No. 10 on the College Media Journal (CMJ) Top 25. The band also played and interviewed on G4 TV's Screen Savers’ Live Music Fridays to promote the album.

In late 2005 the Phenomenauts lineup changed, with Corporal JoeBot departing the band. He was replaced by a new member who went by the name Corporal JoeBot 2.0. Then in late 2006 the band released a music video for the Re-Entry song "Mission". The video appeared on the front page of both YouTube and MySpace, receiving more than 430,000 combined views.

=== For All Mankind (2008) ===
The Phenomenauts released their third full-length album For All Mankind in 2008, on Springman Records imprint Silver Sprocket. The band said the album was "inspired by new wave and 70's punk", and "serves as a call to arms to defenders of science and honor across the galaxy". The album contained the track "Science And Honor", which explained the band's motto and philosophy.

At release the physical copies of the album were sold with extra items, including a die-cast metal pin, a 24-page color booklet, and a package that folded out to make a rocket ship. The band explained that they added these items to give fans an extra reason to purchase the album: "The biggest negative right now is that CDs just don't sell. Vinyl actually is selling more than CDs, because it's got some extra flavor to it. It has something people want to hold in their hand. [We added the items] for that reason. ... I think it's people wanting to reach out and touch a piece of the band—to hold something they have created, [it] gets them a little closer".

The album was reviewed favorably in local publications such as East Bay Express, which wrote, "The Phenomenauts come roaring out of the gate at warp speed on their third album". To promote the album The Phenomenauts went on two tours. The first was a United States national tour with The A.K.A.s. They followed up with an international tour across the U.S. and Canada with San Francisco band The Re-Volts. The band also collaborated with Emmy Award winning writer Rich Fogel and Eisner Award winning artist Erica Henderson to create an animated music video for the song "Infinite Frontier".

In February 2009 The Phenomenauts lineup changed again, with JoeBot 2.0 and Captain Chreehos leaving. Two new members took their place: Leftenant AR-7 on guitar and vocals, and Deck Chief Nick Wayzar playing bass.

=== Electric Sheep (2010) ===
In 2010 The Phenomenauts released the digital-only mini-album Electric Sheep, containing four new songs. The album featured AR7's first songwriting and singing with the band. The band departed on their second European tour, "Operation: Europe!", to promote the album after release.

Between Electric Sheep and their next album the band changed bass players. Nick Wayzar was replaced by Chief Engineer Atom Bomb, playing the Stand-Down Bass.

=== Escape Velocity (2013–present) ===
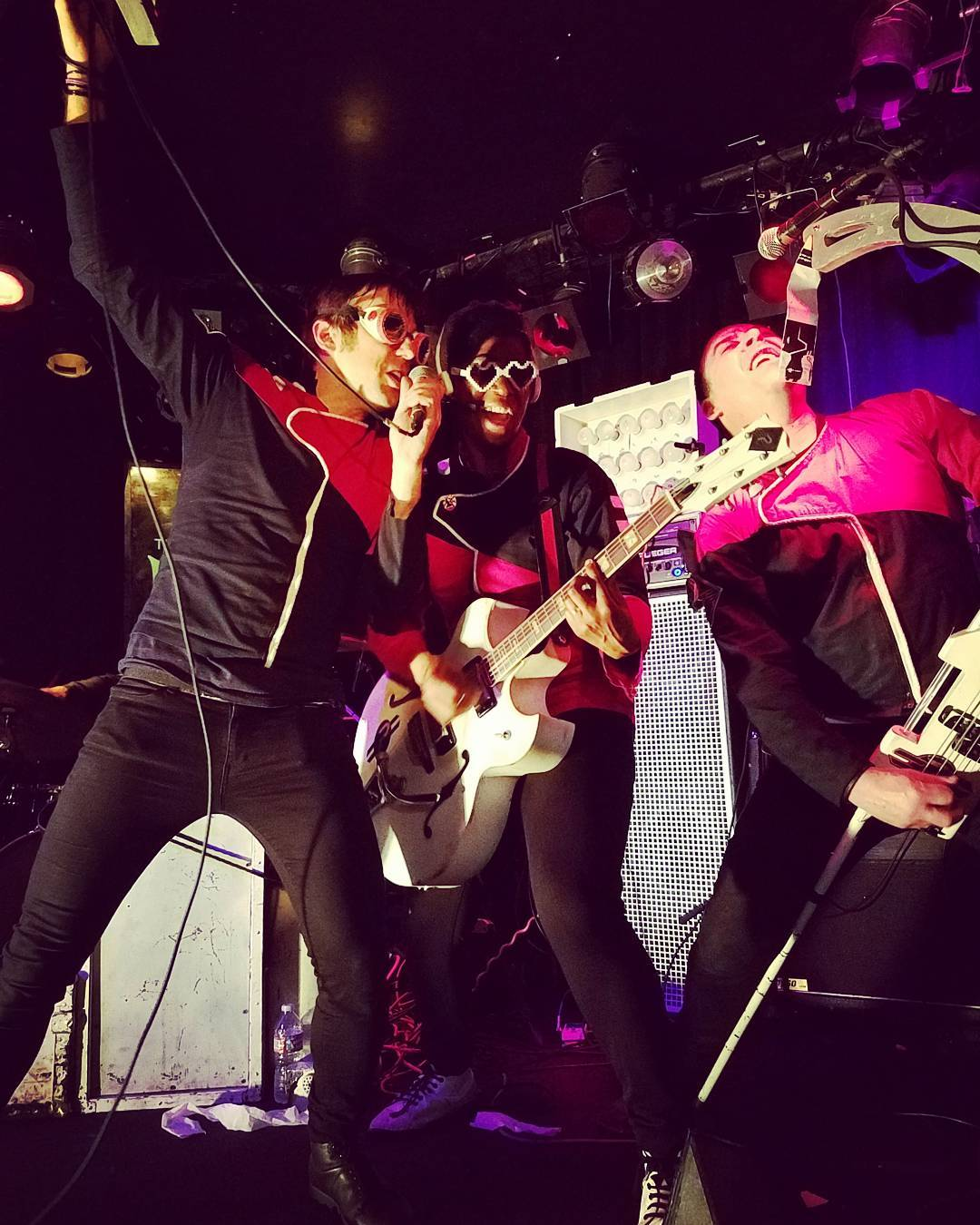
The Phenomenauts designed new uniforms for the Escape Velocity album launch. Left to right: Atom Bomb, Ripley Clipse, and Angel Nova.

In 2013 the Phenomenauts ran an online fundraiser for their next album, to raise money for studio time and to cover a tour. Fans could bid to vote on naming the album, or on other items such as playing laser tag or bowling with the band.

The album was released in 2014 with the title Escape Velocity, an album they hoped "encourages people to break free of their own limitations". The band described the album sound as a departure from their previous albums. Rather than focusing on one style or theme, Escape Velocity was a combination of "second half of the 20th century Rock and Roll". It combined many different sounds including 50s Rock and Roll, 60s Soul music, 70s glam, and early 80s punk rock. Nova said "musically, it's more diverse than anything we’ve ever recorded". The Phenomenauts used the album launch to visually rebrand. Atom Bomb designed a new logo, and Nova designed new uniforms.

A Huffington Post reviewer said that Escape Velocity stepped away from the "pure rockabilly music" of the band's previous albums. They felt the work had a "more polished ... clean ... and futuristic style" in songs like "Infinity Plus One", but kept "fast hooks" and was "right at home at a ... sock hop" with songs like "Rocket Soul". A For The Love Of Punk reviewer noted "[it] reminds me of a modern, punk rock Chuck Berry that’s about science". The band went on their third European tour at the end of 2014 to promote the album, playing in the UK, France, Germany, Italy, and Switzerland.

In 2015 Ripley Clipse joined the band playing keyboard, taking over from Professor Arius.

Starting in 2015 the Escape Velocity song "Theme for Oakland" was used as the official after-game celebration song for the Oakland Athletics. The song was used again in 2017 in a series of commercials promoting the Athletics and the city.

In February 2020, The Phenomenauts issued a statement on the band's Facebook page, announcing the firing of Angel Nova from the group, stating, "We recently learned that a member of our band has violated these principles. So as a band, we’ve made the decision to move forward without Angel Nova. We do not condone his actions and find them completely unacceptable. We respect the privacy of those involved – their stories are not ours to tell, so we would like to focus on what we can do moving forward. We are thankful to the brave people who have come forward to tell their stories and we’ll continue to support survivors of sexual and emotional abuse." While not specifically mentioning what allegations led to Nova's removal, the band encouraged fans to support anti-sexual abuse and anti-domestic violence support organizations.

== Commando performances ==
The Phenomenauts earned a reputation for "staging commando performances" at venues where they were not booked, and were often unwelcome. They played "on the sidewalk in front of the venue" after a show at The Fillmore, and had shows "cut short by security guards" after sneaking backstage at the 2003 California Music Awards. "Security couldn’t figure out how to unplug us cause we brought our own power source. ... Eventually, between songs they asked us to stop but they were kind of powerless".

The band frequently staged performances in front of other venues, where crowds had already gathered:

"When we first started, we used to take a car battery and an inverter and put it together and then plug a bunch of amplifiers into it and strap it all to a dolly. And then we’d get out of a van that looked like a spaceship ... and we would just start rocking. We’d blast smoke off, and people just didn’t know what the hell was going on. We’re all wearing space outfits ... and we’d just kind of plop down in front of a concert, ... play a show and people loved it. ... We’d play three or four songs and we’d get out of there as fast as we could".

— Commander Angel Nova

=== Sneaking into the Warped Tour ===
The band gained notoriety in 2002 and 2003 for sneaking onto the Warped Tour. In 2002 they "found an open gate in the back, hid behind a dumpster and then quickly set up in front of the stage and started playing". In San Francisco "a security guard told them to get a move on. However, while loading their gear—in full 'uniform'—into the group's 'space van', another security guard ... assumed they were supposed to be there ... [and] kindly directed them to the official artist entrance". In Portland 2003 they drove their tour van into the backstage area "and cooked breakfast for the technical crew", including "the people that actually make the passes". Once they had laminated all-access, photo-ID passes the Phenomenauts followed the tour from city to city in their own vehicle. They set up their own gear each time and played sets for another six full weeks.

The Phenomenauts were officially invited back to play on the Warped Tour in 2004, with a press release that read "The Phenomenauts have been announced as the official Breakfast Band for this years Vans Warped Tour". A Philadelphia Inquirer review of the tour called The Phenomenauts "one of the best performances", saying they "played a swinging amalgam of dusty garage rock and new wave".

The band declined an offer to join Warped Tour again in 2005. Instead they played with The Aquabats and the Epoxies on the "Teenage Pajamas from Outer Space Tour".

The band noted that playing the Warped Tour led to many introductions and collaborations with other artists. Through contacts from the Warped Tour, they opened for Les Claypool of Primus at his 2005 New Year's Eve show, and worked with children's author Sandra Boynton on the album Dog Train.

== Theatrics and theme ==
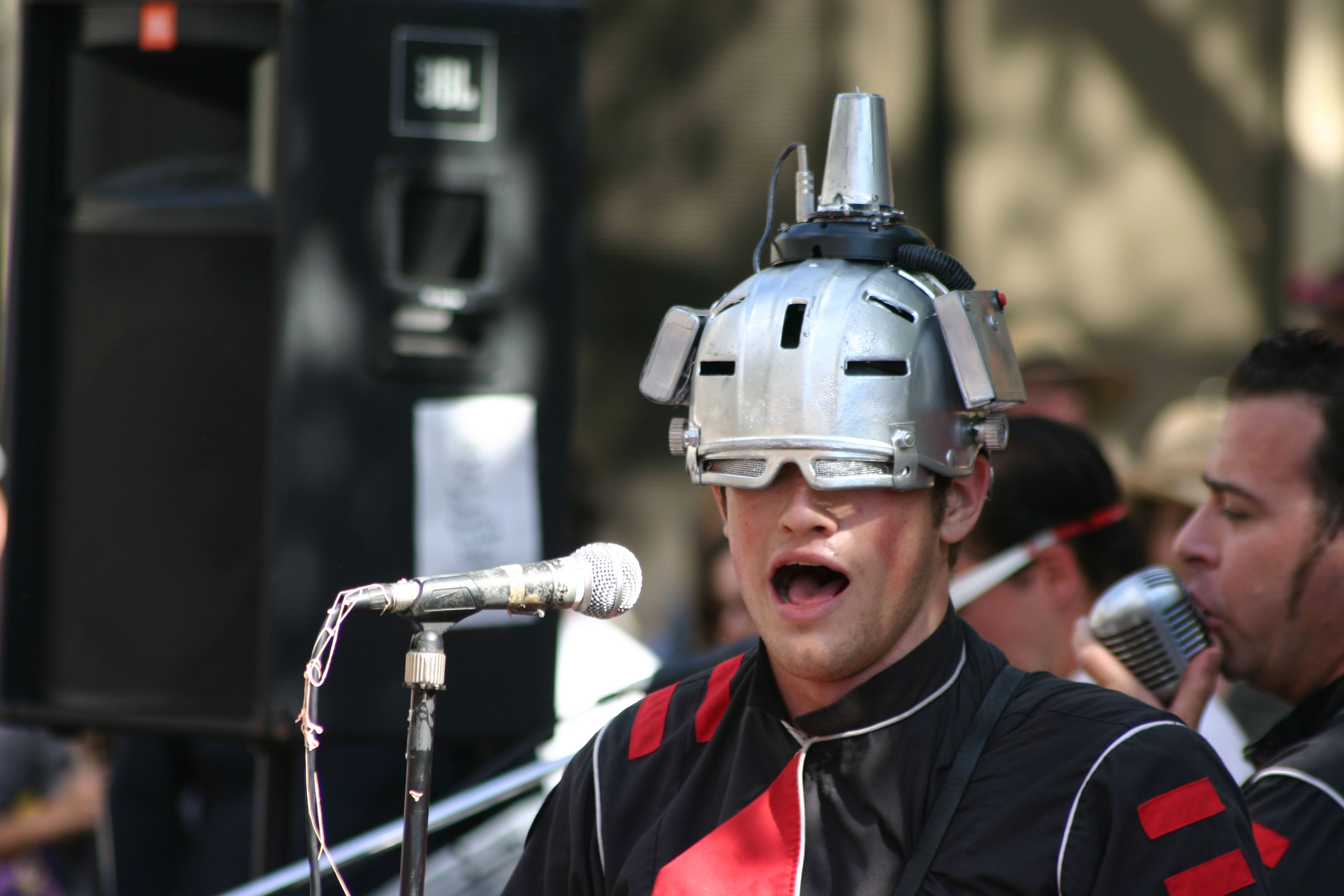
Corporal Joebot 2.0 sports the "Therimatic Helmerator" – a helmet with a wireless theremin. The helmet is worn as part of the band's science and robot theme.

The Phenomenauts perform under a space and science fiction persona, and are fully committed to their theme. Each band member uses a stage name. They wear uniforms. They call their shows "missions" and their fans "cadets". They even wear uniforms when not performing, considering themselves to be "always on duty".

Each live show begins with the band's signature launch status check. Commander Nova instructs "Give me a go, no-go to Rock", and the band makes sure that all equipment (and the audience) are working. Once the show is declared "Cleared to rock" the band kicks off a 10-second launch countdown and leaps into the first song.

=== Live shows ===
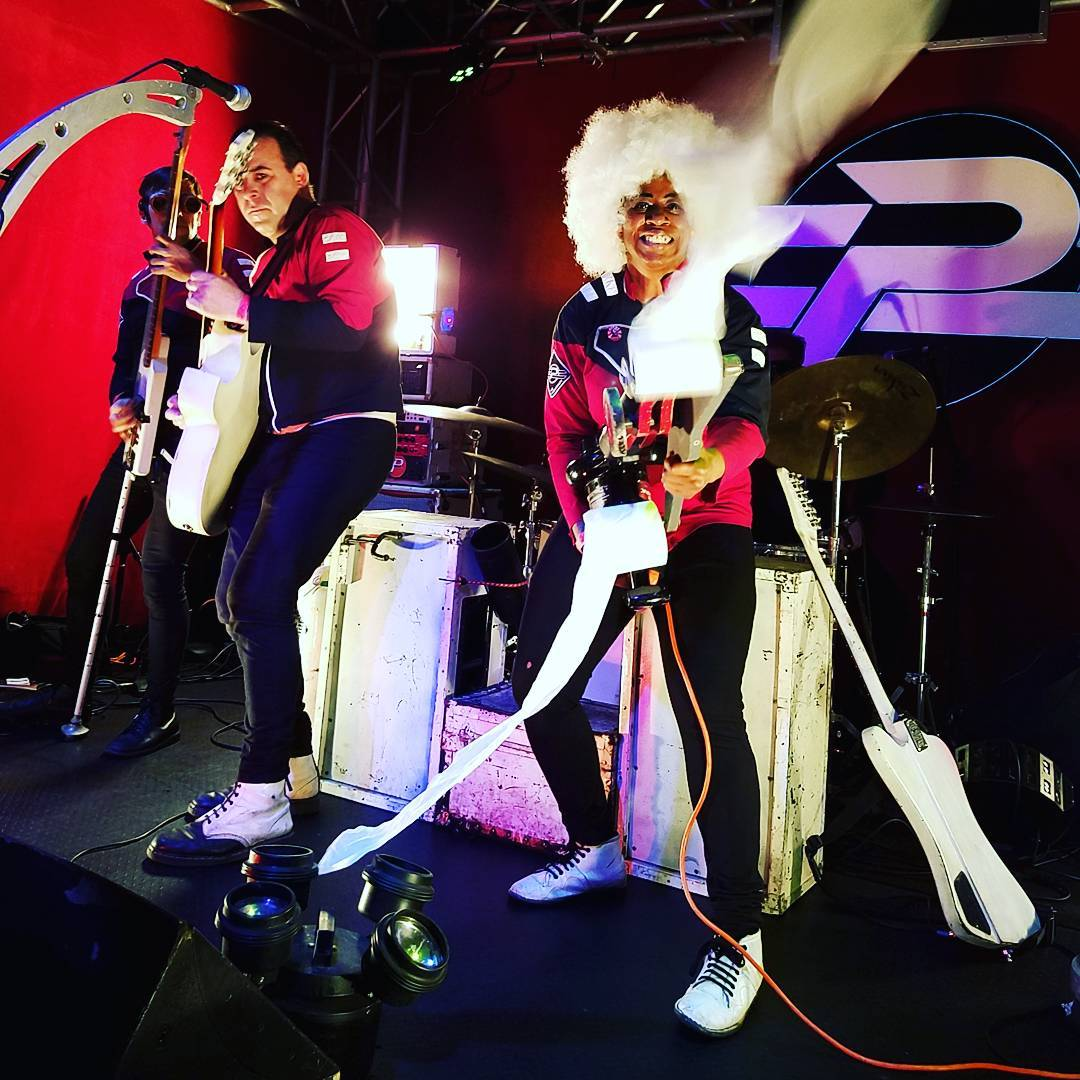
Ripley Clipse demonstrates use of the Streamerator 2000 – a custom-built, motorized toilet paper launcher. It is one of the gadgets used during live shows.

The Phenomenauts gained praise for their stylized live shows and performances. The San Francisco Chronicle said "it is live where the Phenomenauts truly excel", and a Huffington Post reviewer noted they had "a live show that explodes on the stage". Thrasher Magazine said The Phenomenauts "put on one of the best live shows you'll ever see". Colonel Reehotch, the band's Mission Operations Specialist commented that "The Phenomenauts really are at their visual best on a big stage".

During performances the band wears uniforms of their own design and uses custom-made "Phenoma-gadgets". This includes items such as the "Theramatic Helmerator" – a helmet with a wireless theremin that sounds like "old Star Trek episodes". The "Streamerator", created by Professor Greg Arius, blows rolls of toilet paper into the crowd. They blast clouds of carbon dioxide and use inflatable models of Earth. They have been known to use dry-ice blasts and set cymbals on fire.

The band believes their special effects, act, and devices are an integral part of the show. "It’s important to us", explained Leftenant AR-7, "because we want to just blow the lid off of every place we play. We want to give the most entertaining show — visually and aurally — that we can". Drummer Jimmy Boom noted "[We're] trying to encompass it all. We're not just audio. We're not just visual. We try to say hi to the crowd. The best effects are the ones that actually touch the crowd – when they can feel the cold of the CO_{2}. We're trying to hit as many senses as possible". Ronen Kauffman from the Issue Oriented podcast commented that The Phenomenauts were "revisiting the rift between performer and audience, and helping to break that down".

In 2008 Professor Arius' "Streamerator 2000" was featured in Issue 8 of Make magazine. The band Green Day borrowed the device for their 21st Century Breakdown tour in 2009.

=== Phenomenaut vehicles ===
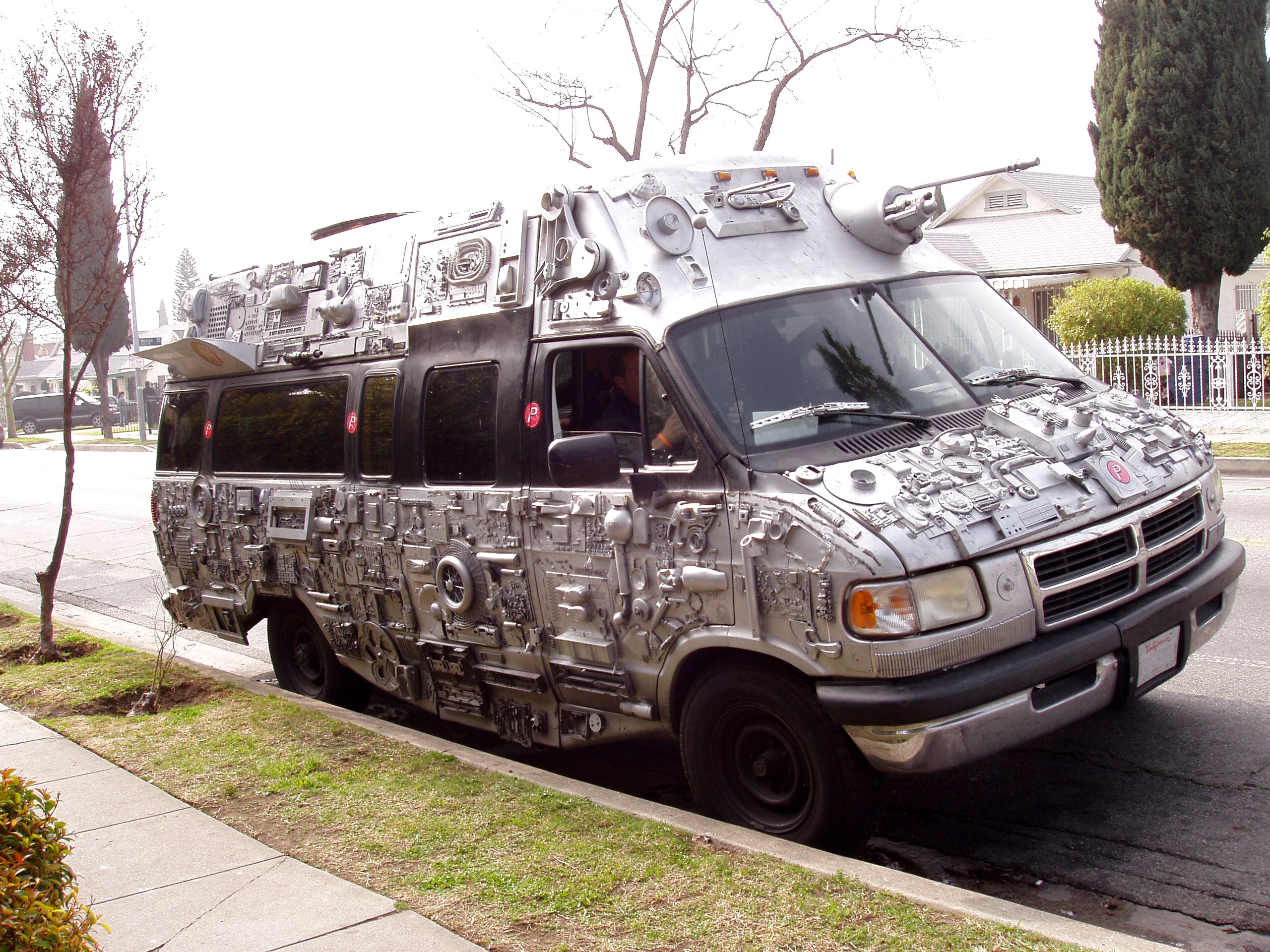
The Phenomabomber – The Phenomenauts customized their vehicles to match their space and science fiction theme.

The Phenomenauts have customized their own fleet of vehicles to match their science fiction theme. It started with a car, which the band nicknamed "The Phenomenator". The vehicles are covered with electronic gadgets such as remote controls, stereo components, and computer parts, all spray-painted silver. The trend continued with their first tour van, which they named "The Phenomabomber".

Nova was inspired to create his own space-themed vehicle by watching Mystery Science Theater 3000. "I noticed one night ... [that] stuff was just glued on and painted the same color, and it just made it look spacey. So I ... did it [to my car] and it looked really cool. Everyone was driving around staring at the PhenomaBomber, and I realized if I had a band name on there it would be a moving billboard".

The Phenomenaut vehicles even made impressions on interviewers, with Frank Meyer from G4 TV noting "It [isn't] everyday that a metallic space-van pulls up ... and five guys dressed in space suits pile out".

=== Command Center ===
When they are not touring the Phenomenauts hang out at their personal top-secret "Command Center". The Command Center is a large converted warehouse located in the industrial heart of Oakland. The Command Center serves as home, rehearsal den, and performance space. It has a musical stage for performing and sub-stage hot tub. The band also uses it to host regular parties.

To create the Command Center the band "set up their own rehearsal studio, completely transforming a typical storage area [and decorating it] to look like outer space". Then they began hosting parties "to showcase their unusual music and worldview".

Commander Nova explains: "it's not easy to break into San Francisco when you've never played anywhere. ... We didn't feel like starting from scratch, so we ... made the place all nice and had shows here. And before long, there were 200 people seeing us. And then we stepped out, and we already had a draw". JoeBot expands: "It’s one of the only venues in (the Bay Area) that can get an audience from San Francisco, Oakland, and Berkeley, which is an odd thing. ... We must be on to something to have all these people show up".

The Command Center was featured in a three-page spread in Punk Rock Confidential, and appears in the independent feature film Punk Rock Holocaust.

== Musical style ==
"Mission" (2004)
Mission, from the second album Re-Entry, showcases the addition of new wave elements. It was featured on the Warped Tour 2005 Compilation, as well as the front page of both YouTube and MySpace in 2006.

The Phenomenauts combine the music styles of many genres, including punk, new wave, garage rock, psychobilly and doo-wop. Their songs contain fast drum beats and guitar riffs, often combined with doo-wop style lyric repetition or callback. Commander Nova describes the formation of the band's style as taking all of their favorite styles of music, "cramm[ing] them all in and launch[ing] it straight into orbit. Also, we put a little more get up and go into it. ... [A] higher punk-to-rock ratio".

Reviewers have described the band as everything from "mixes the mantra-style punk of The Clash with the lovable lunacy of Devo" to combining "upbeat, happy, dance vibrations" with a thrash that "sound[s] like they brought it back ... from the future". A Zero Magazine reviewer called out the song "Mission" as "an excellent example of the Phenomenauts’ versatility". "Mission" covers several music styles, "with a big punk chorus of 'Oh, Oh,' the thumping stand-up bass..., keyboard and a ‘50s style guitar twang". But the reaction from the band is that they've created a style all their own. "We find it fascinating when people call us a punk band, or a rockabilly band, or a ska band. We fit into all categories and none of them. We have roots in punk and new wave and all the other things we listen to, but we're our own thing".

Regardless of the tune, the Phenomenauts' songs deal with the subjects of science, outer space, and robots. "We’re trying to take smartness and nerdiness and jam it together with cool and sexy and have ... all of those things happening at the same time". The band truly believes in the topics both on and off the stage. The members are interested in science, astronomy, technology and humanity.

The band believes that using a theme of space and the future allows them more freedom to write about present-day issues. The song "Earth Is The Best" calls for inspiration and caring about the planet. "The Tale Of Europa" considers how isolated cultures might react to new visitors and traditions.

Corporal JoeBot attests that the Phenomenauts' music can help push forward ideas and make the world a better place. "A lot of bigger music industry corporations want a watered down, formulaic, non-confrontational musical direction. There’s no challenge. I believe that can change, and that we can make a difference".

=== Creative process ===
When creating their music The Phenomenauts consider themselves a working democracy: "All songs were communally written and arranged". In an interview Nova stated "different people come in with different song ideas, and then we all collaborate". For the album Escape Velocity, bassist Atom Bomb noted "For instance, one week we gave ourselves a homework assignment. We had to each bring in a new song to the next practice".

== Promoting science and learning ==
The Phenomenauts' motto is "Science and Honor". The phrase was captured in the song "Science And Honor" on their 2008 album For All Mankind. But the words are "more than just a nifty catchphrase" says Commander Angel Nova. "'Science and Honor' has become a genuine way of life. Science is the search for truth, without any kind of agenda, ... and honor is honesty and integrity. ... So, honest search for truth and don't be a jerk, what more do you need to live by? It's something that I actually honestly believe in".

The band has done several shows and releases promoting science and learning. Nova said "it is especially great when we can trick someone into learning something". In 2011 they played at the Sacramento Freethought Day, an event "encouraging ... science and the First Amendment". In 2014 they played the Bay Area Science Festival. In 2017 the Phenomenauts played at the March for Science in Las Vegas and an event at the Chabot Space and Science Center.

In 2008 The Phenomenauts were invited on a tour of NASA's Lyndon B. Johnson Space Center in Houston. The visit included meetings with astronauts, scientists, and "hands-on experience with space station parts" and training facilities. They also ran a seven-stop "Large Hadron Collider" tour around the Western United States to celebrate the completion of the Large Hadron Collider.

=== I'm With Neil video and album ===
In 2012 the Phenomenauts released the music video "I'm With Neil", an homage to astrophysicist Neil deGrasse Tyson. The band said the video was "chock-full of the scientist’s best media appearances ... to encourage our fans to love him too". Tyson said he was "simultaneously flattered and weirded out".

In 2015 the Phenomenauts released a new recording of "I'm with Neil" on a two-song album of the same name. The album was released as a collectable 7-inch EP, paying tribute to Tyson and the public radio program Science Friday for "science, education, exploration, and progress". The band decided to make the release because "We're all excited and inspired by science, [and] by the prospect of using that knowledge to make tomorrow better than today. ... It is one of the best ways to inspire everyone to work toward a better future". The band donates a portion of the proceeds to the Harlem Educational Activities Fund, an educational non-profit where Tyson is a member of the board of trustees.

== Tours ==
The Phenomenauts have toured with many bands, including The Slackers, The Aquabats, and The Epoxies. They have travelled across the United States on several headlining tours with support from acts like The A.K.A.'s, Teenage Bottlerocket and Kepi Ghoulie. They have played at San Diego Comic-Con, San Francisco Comic-Con, several years at the Maker Faire in 2006 and 2010, as well as the KerPunk Music Festival in London, England.

Bay Area Punk rated the Phenomenauts the "#3 most prolific Bay Area punk band" for performing at least 239 shows in the Bay Area alone from 2000 to 2014.

== Other works ==
=== Comic books ===
In 2011 Silver Sprocket published the Phenomenauts comic book Adventures in the Third Dimension!. The comic was written by Emmy winner Rich Fogel, with art by Eisner winner Erica Henderson, as well as Mitch Clem, Nation of Amanda, Nicholas Kole, Claire Hummel, Stephen R. Buell, and Chris Wisnia. The 48-page comic contains five short stories about the Phenomenauts' adventures. It also has articles such as a word search and "Get To Know Your Phenomenauts" biography.

The comic was used to promote the mini-album Electric Sheep. Each comic was sold with a collectible colored vinyl EP containing two Electric Sheep songs, as well as a digital download code.

In 2015 a six-page Phenomenauts mini-comic, Ghost Ship, was produced by Alice Hill and Johnny Dalton.

=== Video game ===
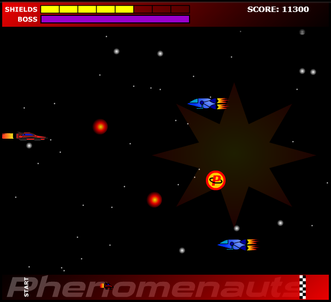
The Phenomenauts video game Space Flight was released in 2006. The player pilots The Phenomenator and shoots alien ships.

In 2006 the Phenomenauts video game Space Flight was released by Smiley Crew Productions. Space Flight is a 2D, horizontal scrolling shoot 'em up. It was written in Flash. Programming and voice acting were done by Noah Wilson, with art direction and design by Katie Horn.

In Space Flight the player pilots the Phenomenauts' vehicle The Phenomenator. They move around the screen to collect power-ups and avoid explosive space mines. The player must shoot obstacles such as asteroids and enemy ships.

Space Flight features a "Story Mode", where players navigate through 10 "missions" and defeat powerful boss characters. It also offers a "Marathon Mode" with endless play, where players work to attain a high score.

While running Space Flight plays music from The Phenomenauts' album Re-Entry. The game was awarded "Daily 3rd Place" on Newgrounds on May 4, 2006.

== Discography ==
- Rockets And Robots (2002, CD, 8-Track, Arlington Lab Recordings / 2003, CD, Springman Records)
- Mission Transmission (2003, 7-inch, Springman Records) – two live songs, later re-released on Re-Entry and Electric Sheep
- Pre-Entry (2004, EP-CD, Springman Records) – five songs, two live. All later re-released on Re-Entry
- Re-Entry (2004, CD, Springman Records; LP, 2007)
- Beyond Warped Live Music Series (2005, DualDisc/DVD-Audio, Immergent Records)
- For All Mankind (2008, CD, Silver Sprocket)
- Electric Sheep (2010, Electronic EP, Silver Sprocket)
- Escape Velocity (2014, Vinyl, CD, Digital, Silver Sprocket)
- I'm with Neil (2015, EP, Digital, Silver Sprocket)

=== Compilations ===
- The Rocky Horror Punk Rock Show (2003, CD, Springman Records) – 8. "Hot Patootie (Bless My Soul)"
- Dog Train: A Wild Ride on the Rock and Roll Side (2005, book and audio CD) – 12. "(Don't Give Me That) Broccoli"
- Vans Warped Tour '05 (2005 Tour Compilation) (2005, CD, SideOneDummy Records) – 24. "Mission"
- Go Cat Go! A Tribute to the Stray Cats (2006, CD, Hairball 8) – 1. "Cry baby"
- Hooligans United: A Tribute to Rancid (2015, CD & Vinyl, Smelvis Records) – 4. "Life Won't Wait" (feat. Vic Ruggiero)

== Filmography ==
- Punk Rock Holocaust (2004), as themselves – Chapter 12, "Space Fight". Music video for "The Year 2000" appears in DVD Special Features
- Dead And Deader (2006) – "Galactic Pioneers" plays during ending credits

== Band members ==
Current and past band members are known only by their stage names, which fit their humorous science fiction theme.

- Major Jimmy Boom (James Curnutt) — drums, backing vocals (founder)
- Leftenant AR-7 (Arthur Leon Adams III) — vocals, guitar, keys (joined 2009)
- Chief Engineer Atom Bomb (Adam Briggs) – bass, backing vocals, sanitation administrator (joined approx. 2012)
- Lunar Captain Ripley Clipse – synthesizer, MOOG, backing vocals, guitar (joined 2015)

=== Past members ===
- Corporal JoeBot 1.0 — vocals, guitar, theremin (founder to approx. 2006)
- Captain Chreehos (Christopher Maas) – double bass, backing vocals (founder to 2009)
- Professor Greg Arius (Gregory Matthew Colvin) – synthesizer, MOOG, backing vocals (joined 2002 to approx. 2014)
- Corporal JoeBot 2.0 (Joeseph Klein) — vocals, guitar (joined approx. 2006 to 2009)
- Angel Nova (Angel Mowbray)– vocals, guitar, bass (founder to 2020)
- Fritz M. Static (Jesse Sutherland) – vocals, guitar, keys (joined approx. 2008 to approx. 2014)
- Deck Chief Nick Wayzar (Nick Kirschner) – double bass, backing vocals (joined 2009 to approx. Aug 2011))
- Agent Ion O'Clast – chaos engineering, keyboard (joined approx. 2012 to 2014)
- Colonel Reehotch (Richard Detty) — talent manager ("mission operation specialist") (founder)
- Bart Applesauce - Double Bass (joined approx Aug 2011 to approx 2012)
