= BASF (disambiguation) =

BASF SE is a European multinational chemical company.

BASF may also refer to:

- BASF (record label), a record label, part of BASF
- Bar Association of San Francisco
- Bay Area Science Festival
