= Luckie Strike =

Punk rock band

- Origin: Sacramento, California, U.S.
- Genre: Punk rock
- Years active: 1996-2002
- Labels: Pork N Beans Records; Tomato Head Records; Fastmusic
- Past members: Kevin Sur; Melanie Levy; Andre Gallardo; Liz Salmi
- Website: luckiestrikeband.com

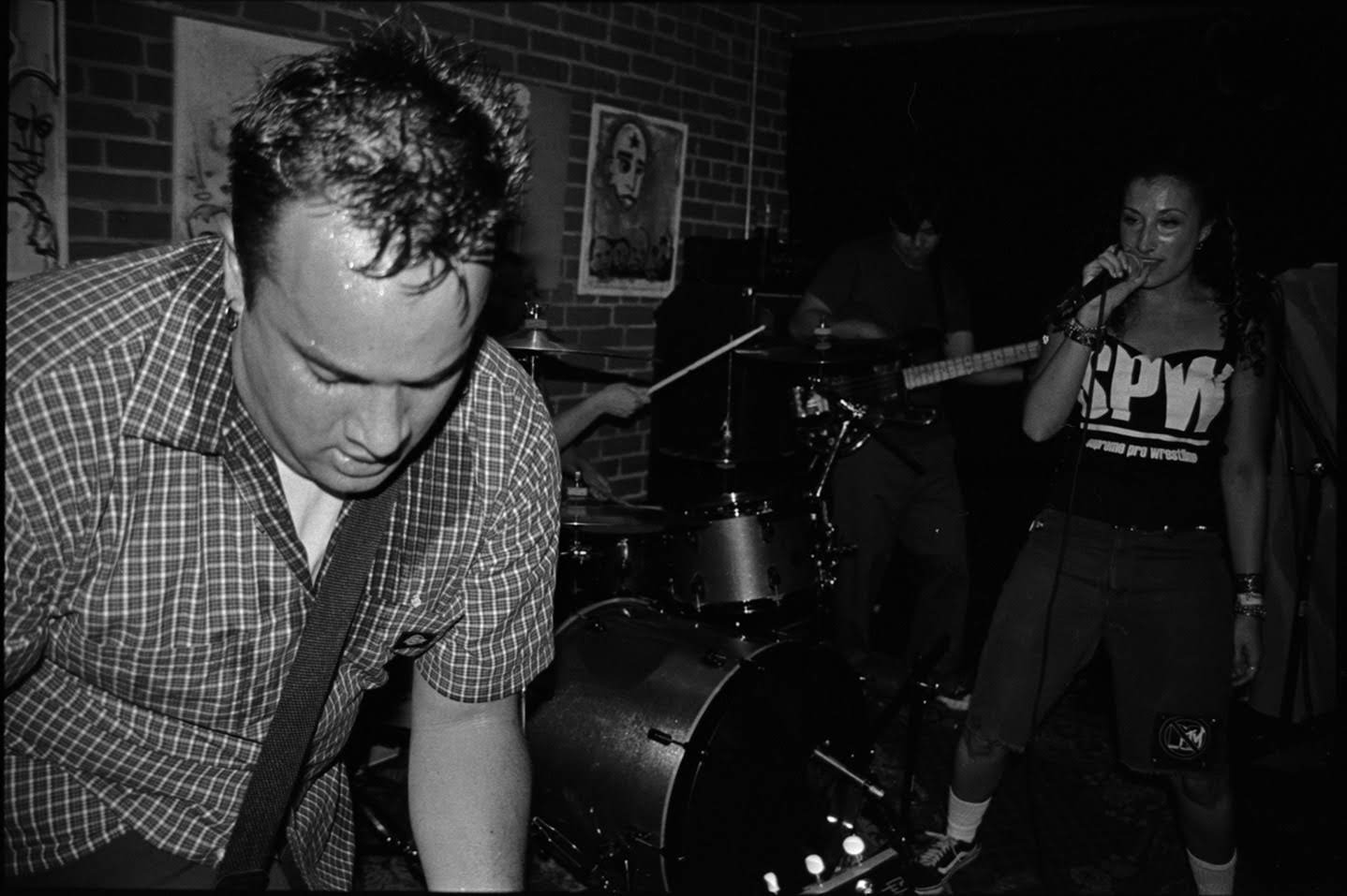
Sacramento punk rock band Luckie Strike, live at Capitol Garage.

Luckie Strike was an American punk rock band from Sacramento, California, formed in 1996. As a female-fronted band, their sound received attention, and both positive and critical reviews. Luckie Strike faced challenges on the road, including a stolen van in 2001, leading to a temporary hiatus and eventual disbandment in 2002.

== History ==
=== Early years ===
Motivated by a sense of not fitting in, Melanie "Mel" Levy (vocals) and Kevin "Bubba" Sur (guitar) sought a creative outlet for imposter syndrome when they founded the band Luckie Strike in 1996. Teaming up with bassist Andre "Dre" Gallardo and drummer Liz Salmi (née Beidelman), the group established roots in Sacramento, California. On the formation of the band, Sur was quoted as saying, "Me and Mel (Levy) were very ambitious. We had a lot of big ideas about what we wanted to do with our lives." The search for Salmi, then a high school senior, and Gallardo, who had relocated from Davao City in the Philippines to Sacramento, took eight months of auditions.

=== Original releases (1997-2001) ===
Luckie Strike released their first full-length album, Geekcore, on Pork N Beans Records in 1997 (a label founded by members of the ska punk band Mealticket). A 1998 review of Geekcore stated that the band, "evokes the spirit of Tilt, delivering a punky and assertive sound that seamlessly blends the loud and rocking elements with clever touches of swing... a remarkable accomplishment for an emerging band on an independent label."

In 1998, Luckie Strike released the four-song EP, Have You Seen Me?, on Tomato Head Records. Levy was awarded a Sacramento Area Music Award (SAMMIE) for “Best Female Vocalist” by Sacramento News & Review in 1999.

Following more than a year of touring across the United States, Luckie Strike released Future Is Turning in early 2000 on Tomato Head Records. The album was produced by Grammy Award Winning producer/engineer Dennis MacKay (David Bowie, Jeff Beck, Judas Priest, Paul McCartney). Logan Whitehurst (of Little Tin Frog, The Velvet Teen, Logan Whitehurst and the Junior Science Club) is listed as a "musical technician" in album credits.

Six months after the release of Future Is Turning, Luckie Strike released The Mercury Project on Fastmusic, where the band continued to work with MacKay and Whitehurst. A review posted to PunkNews.org critiqued Luckie Strike for being, "one of those bands that are not sure what it wants to play." However in the same review, "One cool thing about this band is that the singer is a girl... and has a really good voice that is capable of doing a decent melodic emo, and an awesome raging hardcore scream."

While most of Luckie Strike's music has not yet been released on streaming services, "New Dress," was released on the Disarming Violence compilation album benefitting survivors of domestic violence, and can be found on Apple Music and Spotify.

=== Stolen van, theft of master recordings, and break up (2001-2002) ===
Luckie Strike had their touring van and instruments stolen while on tour to promote The Mercury Project—and in a 2016 interview on the 3 Gigs Podcast, Levy explained, "We had a tour van with a trailer attached... with all of our equipment and the whole thing was gone." Soon thereafter, Luckie Strike’s master recordings went missing at Hyde Street Studios, which the band attributes the missing recordings to a theft by a former manager. At their peak, Luckie Strike performed approximately 150-200 shows annually, and the theft of the van and recordings dealt a significant setback. Reflecting on the challenges, Sur remarked, "We've been through so much that, really, not much could stop us. It's what we have to do. It's just like breathing for us. We have to play music. We absolutely love and enjoy what we do."

Luckie Strike disbanded in the summer of 2002. In Season 4 of the 3 Gigs podcast, host Dominic Davi (Tsunami Bomb) commented on Luckie Strike's worth ethic, stating: "They were intense. They worked harder than any band I have ever met... before or since. I don't care how hard you think your band worked. Luckie Strike worked harder."

== Advocacy work ==
Six years after their break-up, Luckie Strike drummer Salmi received a diagnosis of a malignant brain tumor (brain cancer) in 2008. Lacking medical insurance at the time, Sur and Levy collaborated with the band's network of friends under a banner of "The Liz Army" to raise funds for Salmi's medical costs. Benefit concerts were organized around northern California, ultimately leading to a reunion concert that included the original and current members of Tsunami Bomb, including original vocalist Emily Whitehurst. Emily Whitehurst, a friend and tourmate of Salmi, had her own personal experience with brain cancer, having lost a brother, Logan Whitehurst, to the disease two years prior.

== Post-Luckie Strike activities ==
After Luckie Strike disbanded in 2002, guitarist Sur moved to Seattle, Washington. He went on to form the band Indian Valley Line, and found Artist Home, a company of "culture makers, community builders, and event producers" that serve the Pacific Northwest, recognized for founding Doe Bay Fest and Timber! Outdoor Music Festival. Sur is a DJ for Seattle's KEXP where he hosts a program amplifying voices of Indigenous people.

After 10 years living in the Bay Area, Levy returned to Sacramento and launched Melanie Levy Fitness, which aims to help women make long term, mental and physical changes in their lives through movement.

Gallardo, now based in San Diego, California, is a product designer and art director. He continues to write songs and play music against his better judgment.

In the mid-2000s, drummer Salmi went on to play with My Merry Malady and Angoramachinegun. After being diagnosed with a malignant brain tumor in 2008, Salmi shifted her focus to patient advocacy. She became a researcher affiliated with Harvard Medical School, specializing in facilitating collaborations between clinicians and patients in research co-design, and co-leading the OpenNotes initiative. Her work is published in journals including JAMA Open, the BMJ and the New England Journal of Medicine

== Members ==
=== Former members (1996-2022) ===
- Kevin Sur ("Bubba")
- Melanie Levy ("Mel")
- Andre Gallardo ("Dre")
- Liz Salmi

=== Guest members at live shows ===
- Steven Borth — tenor saxophone on "Walkdown" for Geekcore album at The Crest Theater in Sacramento, CA (1997)
- Andy Pohl — bass guitar at Warped Tour in Summer 2001 (2001)
- Adam Davis — bass guitar at live shows (2002)

== Discography ==
=== Studio albums ===
- Geekcore (1997), Pork N Beans Records
- The Mercury Project (2000), Fastmusic

=== Extended plays ===
- Future Is Turning (2000), Tomato Head Records

=== 7"s ===
- Have You Seen Me? (1999), Tomato Head Records

=== Tapes ===
- "Lucky Strike" Milk Truck (1996), three-song demo tape

=== Cover songs performed ===
==== Recorded ====
- "Sloop John B," Bahamian folk song
- "Radio, Radio," Elvis Costello
- "Rose Tint My World/Floor Show," Rocky Horror Picture Show (on the Rocky Horror Punk Rock Show compilation album)
- "Time For Livin'," Beastie Boys

==== Played live ====
- Toys R Us, theme song
- The A-Team, theme song
- "England Belongs to Me," by Cock Sparrer

=== Unreleased songs ===
- "Never Be The Same"
- "Plastic Town"
- "Now You're Gone"

=== Compilations ===
- "My X-Mas" (1997), Various – The Bands That Stole X-Mas: Sacramento Christmas Compilation
- "Slightly Stoopid" (1999), Various – Mailorder Is Still Fun!, Asian Man Records
- "Sloop John B" (1999), Various – Skratch Magazine's What'd You Expect For Free?, Skratch Magazine
- "25 Hour Day" (1999), Various – MP3: Hotter Than Sex, Riffage.com, Inc.
- "New Dress" (2000), Various – Disarming Violence, Fastmusic
- "Slightly Stoopid" (2000), Various – What'd You Expect For Free? Vol. 8, Skratch Magazine
- "Slightly Stoopid" (2000), Various – Jet Set2 (Airport Lounge), Riffage Records
- "Danny Elfman Got Me Dressed" (2000), TodayVarious – What'd You Expect For Free? (Sept 00 - Vol. 9), Skratch Magazine
- "Plastic Town" (2001), Various – Punk Rock Strike Vol. 2: Punk Rock Strikes Back, Springman Records
- "Cruise Control" (2001), Various – Bottled Violence, Out Of Step Records
- "Slightly Stoopid" (2001), Various – Culture Shock Punk Rock, Tomato Head Records
- "Slightly Stoopid" (2001), Various – Cross Road, Sky Records
- "House Arrest" (2001), Various – Ohio And Beyond, Nice Guy Records
- "Danny Elfman Got Me Dressed Today" (2001), Various – Fastmusic Punk Compilation 2001, Fastmusic
- "Now You're Gone" (2001), Various – It's All About The Punk, Baby!, Orange Peal Records
- "Plastic Town" (2002), Various – 3 Chord Rocket Science, Suckerpunch Records
- "Rose Tint My World/Floor Show" (2003), Various – The Rocky Horror Punk Rock Show, Springman Records
- "Plastic Town" (2003), Various – Punk Rock Strike (Three Disc Set: Volumes 1, 2 And 3), Springman Records
- "Cruise Control" (2003), Various – The Dark Album (The Y2K Phenomenon), Bat Guano Productions

=== Videos ===
- "How The Story Goes" (posted to YouTube in 2009)
- "Live in Carson City, Nevada" (recorded May 16, 2021, posted to YouTube)
- Live show (full set) at the Boarderline Warehouse in Sonora, California (recorded April 19, 1997, posted to YouTube)
