= Cincotta =

Cincotta (Italian pronunciation: [tʃiŋˈkɔtta]) is an Italian surname. The countries of highest prevalence are Italy, United States, Argentina and Australia. Most likely to have originated in Sicily or, potentially, the Eolian Islands/Stromboli.

== Notable people ==
- Gale Cincotta (1929–2001), American activist
- George A. Cincotta (1914–1985), American politician
- Stefano Cincotta (born 1991), Guatemalan footballer
- Theodore Cincotta (born 1976), better known as Theo Logian

== See also ==
- Cincotta (disambiguation)
