= Born in the Basement =

Studio album by the Groovie Ghoulies
- Released: 1994
- Genre: Punk rock, horror punk, pop punk
- Label: Green Door Records; Lookout!
- Producer: Conrad Uno

Groovie Ghoulies chronology
Appetite for Adrenochrome (1989)	Born in the Basement (1994)	World Contact Day (1996)

Born in the Basement is the second album by the Sacramento, California punk rock band the Groovie Ghoulies, released in 1994 by Green Door Records. It was recorded at Egg Studios in Seattle with producer Conrad Uno and engineer Mark Guenther. The album's artwork is credited to The Poison Pen, with a band photo taken by Curt Doughty.

The opening track, "Blood Intro", is an instrumental version of "Blood Beach" from the band's preceding album Appetite for Adrenochrome. Like Appetite for Adrenochrome, Born in the Basement includes five cover versions of songs from the 1960s, 1970s, and 1980s. "Hello Hello" was written by Wes Farrell and Tony Romeo and originally performed by The Partridge Family on Shopping Bag (1971). "Levitation" was written by Tommy Hall and Stacy Sutherland of the 13th Floor Elevators and originally appeared on their album Easter Everywhere (1967). "A Message to Pretty" was written by Arthur Lee for his band Love and originally appeared on their eponymous 1966 album. "Walk Out in the Rain" was written by Bob Dylan and Helena Springs, arranged by Dan Janisch, and originally performed by Eric Clapton on Backless (1978). "Hell Time" was written and originally performed by Dylan as "Band of the Hand", sometimes known as "Band of the Hand (It's Hell Time Man)", for the 1986 film Band of the Hand.

Born in the Basement was remastered and reissued by Lookout! in September 1996. This version was re-released by Springman Records in 2004. The album was remastered again in 2015 by Denny Muller and released on CD and LP by Eccentric Pop Records. In 2003 the Groovie Ghoulies, with new drummer Scampi, recorded a new version of "The Beast with Five Hands" for a "best of" album entitled Monster Club.

== Reception ==
Professional ratings
Review scores
Source	Rating
Allmusic	3/5 stars

Sarah Tomlinson of Allmusic reviewed the album positively, commenting that "The songs are stripped down and raspy compared to later Ghoulies efforts, but the effect is used well and throws into greater relief the many small moments that startle like a fun house skeleton. [...] While the spirit of the music is the fun to be had when you embrace your misfit status and get down to the joys of music, romance, and even rainswept nights — and the songs themselves are fun — these details add subtle pleasure."

== Track listing ==
All tracks are written by Kepi Ghoulie except where noted

No.	Title	Length
1.	"Blood Intro"	1:58
2.	"Hello Hello" (Wes Farrell, Tony Romeo; originally performed by The Partridge Family)	2:04
3.	"Levitation" (Tommy Hall, Stacy Sutherland; originally performed by the 13th Floor Elevators)	2:39
4.	"My Car"	2:19
5.	"The Beast with Five Hands"	2:32
6.	"A Message to Pretty" (Arthur Lee; originally performed by Love)	2:09
7.	"Pumpkinhead"	1:59
8.	"Back to the Garage"	1:55
9.	"I Wanna Have Fun"	2:15
10.	"Born in the Basement"	1:57
11.	"Walk Out in the Rain" (Bob Dylan, Helena Springs, Dan Janisch; originally performed by Eric Clapton)	1:08
12.	"Hell Time" (Dylan; originally performed by Bob Dylan as "Band of the Hand")	2:02
13.	"I Ain't Talkin' to You"	2:53
14.	"Hypergenerate"	1:59
15.	"Think of Me" (unlisted track)	1:59

== Personnel ==
- Kepi Ghoulie – vocals, bass guitar
- Roach – guitar, backing vocals on "The Beast with Five Hands"
- Wendy – drum kit, backing vocals on "The Beast with Five Hands"
- Conrad Uno, Cory Vick – handclaps on "The Beast with Five Hands"
