= Appetite for Adrenochrome =

Studio album by the Groovie Ghoulies
- Released: 1989
- Genre: Punk rock, horror punk
- Label: Crimson Corpse, Lookout Records, Green Door Recording Company, Eccentric Pop Records

Groovie Ghoulies chronology
Appetite for Adrenochrome (1989)	Born in the Basement (1994)

Professional ratings
Review scores
Source	Rating
AllMusic	3.5/5 stars
Punknews.org	5/5 stars

Appetite for Adrenochrome is the debut album by the Sacramento punk rock band the Groovie Ghoulies. It was released in 1989 on their independent label, Crimson Corpse Records. It was recorded at Enharmonic Studios in Sacramento with the band's original lineup of Kepi Ghoulie (vocals, guitar), Rudge (guitar), Vetty (bass guitar), and John Philip Sosa (drums). The cover art and the band's logo were done by Alex Mock, while the artwork and typesetting for the lyrics sheet was done by S. Britt.

The album includes five cover versions of songs from the 1960s and 1970s. The Rolling Stones' "2000 Man" was written by Mick Jagger and Keith Richards and originally appeared on Their Satanic Majesties Request in 1967. "King Kong Stomp" was written by comedian Gene Moss and record producer Fred Rice for a record of monster-themed novelty songs entitled Dracula's Greatest Hits in 1964. "Don't Go Out Into the Rain (You're Going to Melt)" was written by Kenny Young for Herman's Hermits in 1967. "Look Out (Here Comes Tomorrow)" was written by Neil Diamond for The Monkees and originally appeared on their 1967 album More of The Monkees. A cover of Kiss' 1976 top-ten hit "Beth" appears as an unlisted track at the end of Appetite for Adrenochrome. The Groovie Ghoulies would continue to record cover versions of songs from the 1950s, 1960s, and 1970s for their releases throughout the rest of their career.

Appetite for Adrenochrome was remastered and reissued by Lookout! Records in September 1996. This version was re-released by Springman Records in 2003. In 2014, the album was remastered by Denny Muller and released on LP and CD by Eccentric Pop Records.

In 2003 the Groovie Ghoulies, now a trio with Kepi Ghoulie as the only remaining original member, recorded new versions of "Look Out (Here Comes Tomorrow)", "King Kong Stomp", "Don't Go Out Into the Rain (You're Going to Melt)", "Blood Beach", "The Blob", and "Do the Bat" for a "best of" album entitled Monster Club.

== Critical reception ==
Trouser Press wrote that "most of the originals on the album bespeak the infancy of the three-chord pop punk being extruded, but there are hints of the anthemic nature of future compositions."

== Track listing ==
All tracks are written by Kepi Ghoulie, except where noted.

No.	Title	Length
1.	"Lost Generation"	1:58
2.	"Do the Bat"	2:04
3.	"Armageddon 2000"	2:39
4.	"2000 Man" (Mick Jagger, Keith Richards; originally performed by The Rolling Stones)	2:19
5.	"My Computer Said 'Kill'"	2:32
6.	"The King Kong Stomp" (Gene Moss, Fred Rice; originally performed by Dracula)	2:09
7.	"No Blood"	1:59
8.	"Don't Go Out Into the Rain (You're Going to Melt)" (Kenny Young; originally performed by Herman's Hermits)	1:55
9.	"The Blob"	2:15
10.	"Dead End"	1:57
11.	"Blood Beach"	1:08
12.	"Look Out (Here Comes Tomorrow)" (Neil Diamond; originally performed by The Monkees)	2:02
13.	"Ghoul Chant"	2:53
14.	"Beth" (Peter Criss, Stan Penridge; originally performed by Kiss – unlisted track)	1:59

== Members ==
- Kepi Ghoulie – vocals, guitar
- Rudge – guitar, backing vocals
- John "Vetty" Vetter – bass guitar, backing vocals
- John Phillip (Johny) Sosa – drums, backing vocals
