= Tomatohead =

Tomatohead or Tomato Head may refer to:

- Tomato Head Records, an American independent music record label
- Tomatohead, a fictional turkey vulture in the children's TV series Zoboomafoo
