= Love Equals Death =

Punk rock band from Petaluma, California

- The band's Nightmerica lineup, left to right: Travis, Duffs, Davi, and Garcia-Romero

Background information
- Origin: Petaluma, California
- Genres: Punk rock
- Years active: 2003–2009, 2019-2024
- Labels: SBAM, Popsmear, Treasure Trunk, Fat Wreck Chords
- Members: Chris Ivy; Matt Brown; Tony Heckerman
- Past members: Chon Travis; John Rosser; Dominic Davi; Tonio Garcia-Romero; Duffs; Ryan Sinn; Tom Arnott; Sean Jordon; Bryan Kelly-Holden
- Website: loveequalsdeath.net

Love Equals Death was a punk rock band from Petaluma, California, whose music drew influence from classic rock and horror punk. The group formed in 2003 and released two EPs, one compilation album, and one studio album, 2006's Nightmerica. They toured the United States several times, but encountered problems when founding bassist Dominic Davi was arrested in March 2007 on allegations of rape and subsequently dismissed from the band. He was replaced by former Distillers and Angels & Airwaves bassist Ryan Sinn, and the band toured Europe. After Sinn left, a retooled Love Equals Death lineup performed on the 2008 Warped Tour and planned to record a second album, but disbanded after singer and founding member Chon Travis quit in January 2009. Travis reformed the band in 2019 and released new music on SBAM records.

== History ==
=== 2003–05: Formation and EPs ===
Love Equals Death formed in Petaluma, California in 2003, and generally celebrated Halloween as the anniversary of their formation. The band's initial lineup consisted of vocalist Chon Travis (formerly of Loose Change and Envain), guitarist John Rosser, bassist Dominic Davi (formerly of Tsunami Bomb), and drummer Tonio Garcia-Romero. Their first release of recorded material was a cover version of "Dammit Janet" on the compilation album The Rocky Horror Punk Rock Show, released that December. Their debut EP, 4 Notes on a Dying Scale, was released through Popsmear Records, and the band supported it with shows in the San Francisco Bay Area and their first United States tour in September 2004. A second tour followed from February to April 2005.

Rosser was replaced by Duffs, and the group continued to tour. A compilation album titled The Prelude was released in Japan in July 2005 through the Treasure Trunk label, consisting of 4 Notes on a Dying Scale along with demo tracks. The Hucklebuck EP was released the following month through Popsmear. Love Equals Death signed to Fat Wreck Chords in August 2005 after label head Fat Mike was impressed by their live performance. A United States tour followed from October to December 2005, supporting The God Awfuls and The Eyeliners.

=== 2006: Nightmerica ===
Love Equals Death recorded their full-length album Nightmerica in November 2005 at The Blasting Room in Fort Collins, Colorado, with producers Bill Stevenson and Jason Livermore. Leading up to the album's release, they toured the United States as an opening act for Pennywise, No Use for a Name, and The Suicide Machines in January 2006, and for Tiger Army that March.

Nightmerica was released March 21, 2006. Corey Apar of Allmusic called it "way more interesting than their fake horror film façade would suggest ... Love Equals Death is really more like a multifaceted version of a late-'90s skate punk band ... promising and refreshing in its mix of old and new sounds, Nightmerica is a breath of fresh air among the ironic screamo bands of the world." Chris Moran of Punknews.org complemented the range of Travis' vocals and the musicianship as "extremely tight", but felt that the songs went in too many musical directions to give the band a firm identity: "This record is just all over the map. One minute we've got some Goth Bay hardcore, the next we've got Morrissey ... Nightmerica has some really good songs. But the album itself lacks direction and seems almost rushed ... there's just too much going on for one album. Especially from a band that many are not too familiar with." Both reviewers likened Nightmerica to the first four albums by AFI.

Love Equals Death supported the album with a music video for the song "Pray for Me" and by playing shows with the Mad Caddies, Mercy Killers, Verse, Rise Against, Strike Anywhere, Sick of It All, Stretch Arm Strong, and First Blood before touring with Time Again from May through June 2006. They also opened for Death by Stereo that August and released a second music video in October, for the song "Bombs Over Brooklyn". A tour across the United States with labelmates the Mad Caddies followed through November.

=== 2007: Davi's departure ===
In January 2007 Love Equals Death toured California and the southwestern United States with fellow Fat Wreck Chords acts NOFX, Strike Anywhere, and Dead to Me. Towards the end of the tour, the band was robbed in Sacramento, California, when their tour van was broken into and personal belongings were stolen. A music video was released for the song "Truth Has Failed", featuring cameos by members of Pennywise, AFI, The Suicide Machines, and No Use for a Name. A split album with Death by Stereo was planned. That March they toured the west coast with AFI, Smoke or Fire, Viva Hate, The Shook Ones, and Love Me Destroyer. On Love Equals Death's penultimate night of the tour, bassist Dominic Davi was arrested in Fullerton, California, on charges stemming from an alleged rape of a Virginia woman in June 2006. Singer Chon Travis issued a statement saying "We at camp LED stand by [Davi] and hope that this will all clear up soon. We will not pass any judgement on anyone until this is settled". However, less than two weeks later he announced Davi's separation from the band:

We would like to make it perfectly clear here at camp LED that we do not in any way condone any such behavior related to these charges. We, however, are not a judge or a jury and don't want to be one any time soon. We are however a band that really just wants to continue playing music. We know that these times have been severely trying for Dominic and the accuser. We hope for the best outcome for all parties. However, Dominic will no longer be playing music or working on behalf of Love Equals Death. This matter that he faces requires all of his attention right now and we wish him well as I know all of you do.

In a July 2008 statement, Davi maintained his innocence and said that the charge of rape had been dropped and gave his thoughts on his departure from the band:

I want to make this absolutely clear, I never raped anyone. Ever. And the charges of rape were dropped against me back in December [2007]. Even the state prosecutor involved in this case admitted that he didn't believe I ever raped anyone. The person that made these accusations against me changed her story about what happened that night every single time she told it... It's fair to say that the guys in Love Equals Death freaked out when all of this happened. I don't blame them for that – there isn't a guide book to follow in a situation like this. They made it clear to me that they needed to focus on the band and their career as best as they could, and that it would be best for me to focus on my defense. It hurt at the time, but I knew I did have to focus on defending myself.

=== 2008–09: Lineup changes and disbanding ===
Love Equals Death remained active, scheduling a May 2007 performance with the Germs and stating they had written new songs and would still be releasing a split album with Death by Stereo. In June 2007 Ryan Sinn, formerly of The Distillers and Angels & Airwaves, joined the band as Davi's replacement. The group premiered a new song, "Last Dance", that October through their Myspace profile, while Sinn also formed a supergroup called The Innocent with Brooks Wackerman of Bad Religion, Brandan Schieppati of Bleeding Through, and Dave Nassie of No Use for a Name. Love Equals Death toured with Tiger Army in November, then travelled to Europe for a headlining tour through December, with 20 dates across eight countries, ending on 22 December in Bocholt, Germany.

By March 2008 Sinn had been replaced by Sean Jordon, and Bryan Kelly-Holden had joined the band as rhythm guitarist. This lineup played seven dates of the 2008 Warped Tour and planned to record their follow-up to Nightmerica that August with producers Travis Richter and Lee Dyness. However, Chon Travis left Love Equals Death in January 2009, citing a desire to pursue a solo project:

Love Equals Death proved to be a strong band and a fun band to be in, but I never felt comfortable in the band. I never felt like it was my band or that I was really a part of everyone else here ... Right before I joined LED, I started a solo project that I put on the back burner, because things were going well with LED and I ended up getting too busy to focus on it. I kept writing songs for both LED and the solo shit, knowing one day I would have to part ways with LED to fulfill my desire to express myself the way I had always dreamed. I was going to do this sooner and then [Davi was arrested]. So I stayed to help get the band back on track and I never leave anything on a negative note.

That April Love Equals Death announced their breakup, saying "It's been a back and forth battle with everyone here to move on or to let go of this thing we love so much. We have decided to let go of Love Equals Death and preserve the good times we had and the hurdles we had to overcome. We will no longer be functioning as a band and will be calling it quits."

=== Post-breakup activity ===
Following Love Equals Death's disbanding, Duffs, Jordon, and Kelly-Holden formed a new band, Good Knives, with singer Shaun Phillips of British punk rock band The Ruined. Using songs they had written for Love Equals Death's proposed second album and working with producer Lee Dyness, the group released an eponymously titled album in March 2010 and toured Europe.

In November 2011 Chon Travis was arrested in Ukiah, California, and jailed on charges of methamphetamine and ecstasy use, possession and transport of methamphetamine for sale, and driving with a suspended license, after police reportedly found more than 11 grams of methamphetamine in his car. Travis denied the accusations, claiming the evidence had been planted and that he had tried to cooperate with the police.

== Reformation ==
In 2019 Chon Travis reformed Love Equals Death with a new lineup. A compilation, The Hour of Resurrection (2021) and a new full-length album, Gravity and Grace (2022), were released on SBAM Records.

Travis died on August 11, 2024, during a European Tour. He was found dead with his guitar in a hotel room in Stafford.

== Members ==
Current

- Chris Ivy - guitar (2022–2024)
- Matt Brown - bass guitar (2022–2024)
- Tony Heckerman - drums (2024)

Former

- Chon Travis – lead vocals, guitar (2003–2009, 2019–2024; his death)
- Johnny Myers – drums (2019–2020)
- Tom Arnott - guitar (2009-2011, 2021-2022)
- Jeremy Lantz – bass (2019–2020)
- Tim Parks – guitar (2019)
- John Rosser – guitar (2003–2005)
- Dominic Davi – bass guitar (2003–2007)
- Tonio Garcia-Romero – drums (2003–2009)
- Justin "Duffs" Levine – guitar (2005–2009)
- Ryan Sinn – bass guitar (2007–2008)
- Sean Jordon – bass guitar (2008–2009)
- Bryan Kelly-Holden – guitar (2008–2009)

== Discography ==
Studio album

- Nightmerica (March 2006, Fat Wreck Chords)
- The Hour of Resurrection (Oct. 4th, 2021, SBAM Records)
- Gravity and Grace (July 2022, SBAM Records)

Compilation album

- The Prelude (July 2005, Treasure Trunk Records)

Splits

- Love equals death/ The static age

(October 2020, Say-10 records, SBAM records )

EPs

- 4 Notes on a Dying Scale (January 2005, Popsmear Records)
- The Hucklebuck EP (August 2005, Popsmear Records)

Other appearances

- The Rocky Horror Punk Rock Show (December 2003, Springman Records) – cover version of "Dammit Janet"

Music videos

- "The Outsiders" (2006)
- "Pray for Me" (2006)
- "Bombs Over Brooklyn" (2006)
- "Truth Has Failed" (2007)
- "Saliendo in Crastinum" (2022)
- "3420" (2024)
