= Nightmerica =

Studio album by Love Equals Death
- Released: March 21, 2006
- Genre: Punk rock
- Label: Fat Wreck

Love Equals Death chronology
| The Hucklebuck EP (2005) | Nightmerica (2006) |

Professional ratings
Review scores
| Source | Rating |
|---|---|
| AllMusic | 3.5/5 stars |
| PunkNews | 3/5 stars |

Nightmerica is the first studio album released by American punk band Love Equals Death. It was released in 2006 on Fat Wreck Chords.

== Track list ==
| No. | Title | Length |
|---|---|---|
| 1. | "Bombs Over Brooklyn" | 3:24 |
| 2. | "When We Fall" | 2:38 |
| 3. | "Lottery" | 3:40 |
| 4. | "Sonora" | 3:36 |
| 5. | "Black Rain" | 3:24 |
| 6. | "V.O.C. (Voice of Change)" | 1:00 |
| 7. | "The Broadcast" | 2:44 |
| 8. | "Numb" | 1:54 |
| 9. | "Pray For Me" | 2:23 |
| 10. | "Caught in a Trap" | 2:30 |
| 11. | "Plastico Americana (LP only)" |
| 12. | "Truth Has Failed" | 3:25 |

== Personnel ==
Love Equals Death

- Chon Travis - lead vocals
- Duffs - guitar, backing vocals
- Dominic Davi - bass guitar, backing vocals
- Tonio Garcia-Romero - drums, percussion
