= New Reliable Press =

Defunct Canadian comic book and graphic novel publisher

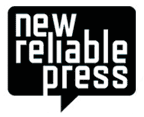
- Industry: Comics
- Founded: 2005
- Founder: Ed Brisson
- Defunct: 2010
- Headquarters: Vancouver, British Columbia
- Website: www.NewReliable.com

New Reliable Press was a Canadian comic book and graphic novel publishing company, owned and operated by Ed Brisson.

New Reliable Press is probably best known for publishing the anthology series You Ain't No Dancer, which has contained the work of well-known indie artists Jeffrey Brown, Lilli Carré, Nicholas Gurewitch, K. Thor Jensen, Jason Turner, Hope Larson, Mitch Clem, Liz Prince, Neil Babra, Jim Mahfood, Bryan Lee O'Malley, Dean Trippe, Kate Beaton, Lucy Knisley and Jen Wang.

New Reliable Press ceased operations as a comic publisher in 2010, changing focus to comic and publishing production for other organizations.

== Titles ==
=== Anthologies ===
- You Ain't No Dancer Vol. 1 (September, 2005)
- You Ain't No Dancer Vol. 2 (September, 2006)
- You Ain't No Dancer Vol. 3 (October, 2008)
- Acts of Violence: An Anthology of Crime - co-production with Critical Hit Comics, Caper Away Productions and Caruso Comics (March, 2010)

=== Graphic novels ===
- True Loves by Jason Turner & Manien Bothma (April, 2006)
- True Loves Vol. 2 by Jason Turner & Manien Bothma (June, 2009)
- Jan's Atomic Heart by Simon Roy (June, 2009)
- Horribleville Vol. 1 by KC Green (February 16, 2010)
