= Nothing Cool =

Former American punk rock band

- Origin: Phoenix, Arizona, United States
- Genres: Punk
- Years active: 1990–present
- Labels: Dummyup Records, Clearview Records
- Members: J Cool; Theo Logian; Jimi Cheetah; Joe Phort

Nothing Cool was an American punk rock band from Phoenix, Arizona (later relocating to San Francisco) in 1994. The band was formed in 1990 by vocalist/guitarist Jeff Bursley and guitarist Justin Berg.

== Discography ==
Nothing Cool

- Taking Advantage of Stupid People (1999)
- What a Wonderful World (1997)
- Losers Hall Of Fame (1995)
- Idiot Word Search w/ The Lillingtons (1996)
- Nothing Cool / The Lillingtons (1996)
- The Unluckiest Man In The Universe (1997)
- Don't Tell Me What to Do (1995)

Members

- Jeremy Bellah – Vocal, Guitar (1990–)
- Theo Logian – Drums, Guitar, Vocal (1990–)
- Joe Phort – Guitar, Vocal (2009–)
- Will Farley – Guitar, Vocal (2009–)
- Neil Durkin – Bass, Drums, Vocal (2009–)
- Jimi Cheetah – Guitar, Bass, Vocals (1990–)
- Eric Zachman – Guitar, Vocal (1990–2000)
- Jeff Bursley – Bass, Vocal (1990–2001)

== Tours ==
Japan 2004 Japan 2006 Europe/UK 2008
