= Jason Turner (cartoonist) =

Canadian cartoonist (born 1970)

Jason Turner (born 22 November 1970) is a Canadian cartoonist, born in Manitoba and currently living in Vancouver. He is most well known for the graphic novel True Loves, which he collaborated on with his wife, Manien Bothma. True Loves, originally serialized in weekly installments online at Serializer, was published in 2006 by the Vancouver-based New Reliable Press. A second volume of True Loves is currently being serialized at Serializer and was published in 2009, also by New Reliable Press. Prior to True Loves, Turner self-published dozens of minicomics, the first being The Roadhouse Stickler. Turner started publishing comics online in 2000 to much acclaim, most notably from cartoonist and comics theorist Scott McCloud, who lists Turner as one of his top twenty favorite cartoonists currently publishing work on the internet.

Turner is a member of the Crown Commission, a collective of Canadian cartoonists. He has contributed work to several anthology books, including Elf World, The Stick Figure Anthology, and several volumes of You Ain't No Dancer.

In 2007, True Loves was nominated for the Vancouver Public Library One Book, One Vancouver award.

His later works include Fir Valley, Farm School, the Adulation, and Bird Comics. Jason's more recent works appeared in magazines such as Broken Pencil and Taddle Creek. Lately, he has been organizing monthly Vancouver Comic Jams.

During the pandemic period in Canada, Jason started writing Outbreak Diaries, an autobiographical diary-style comic that covers the "complexities of working, maintaining relationships, and staying sane during an exceptionally difficult period of time."

== Bibliography ==
Graphic novels

- True Loves (2006)
- True Loves Vol. 2 (2009)

Anthologies

- You Ain't No Dancer Vol. 2 (2006)
- You Ain't No Dancer Vol. 3 (2008)
- Elf World (2007)
