= The Teenage Harlets =

San francisco-based punk band

- Origin: San Francisco, California, United States
- Genres: Surf; Punk rock
- Labels: Dead Girl Records; Springman Records
- Members: Johnny Dismal; Atom Bomb; Chris Van Dyke; Diamond D
- Website: Teenage Harlets

The Teenage Harlets was a garage punk band based in San Francisco. They got together in 1999 and broke up in 2008. The band's music was described as "classic punk rock from a very Cali, surf-garage angle."

The Teenage Harlets toured nationally as an opening band for the Groovie Ghoulies in 2005. They gained recognition at the 2006 SXSW music festival by playing 18 shows by making appearances between bands at outdoor venues all across Austin, Texas. They completed several national tours, including multiple dates on The Vans Warped Tour minor stages.

== Members ==
Final members:

- Johnny Dismal - vocals
- Atom Bomb - drums
- Chris Van Dyke - guitar
- Diamond D - bass

Earlier members:

- Mark - guitar
- Chreehos - bass
- Mikey Quattro - bass
- Joebot 2.0 - organ
- Boss OC-3 - bass
- Kid Kris - bass
- Pablo Fiasco - organ
- Theo Logian - bass
- Buttons - bass
- Rob Lawless - bass
- Jason Spizz Darling - drums
- Kyle Gibson - drums

== Discography ==
The Harlets released eight CD, 7" and 12" records, including "up the fixx", their final LP on Springman Records.

- I Ain't No Square (CD, 2001 Dead Girl Records)
- Some Kinda Girl (7"/CD, 2002 Dead Girl Records)
- Teenage Harlets/The Juvinals Split (Split with The Juvinals)(7"/CD, 2003 Dead Girl Records)
- Teenage Harlets/Coppertones Split (Split with The Coppertones)(CD, 2004 Dead Dirl Records)
- Teenage Harlets (EP, 2004 Dead Girl Records)
- Trash Trash Trash (EP, 2005 Dead Girl Records)
- Up The Fixx (12"/CD, Springman Records)
