= Larry and His Flask =

US musical group

- Origin: Redmond and Bend, Oregon United States
- Genres: Americana Punk
- Years active: 2003–present
- Labels: Xtra Mile Recordings; Silver Sprocket Bicycle Club
- Members: Jamin Marshall; Jeshua Marshall; Ian Cook; Andrew Carew; Miguel Mendoza; Brandon Prinzing
- Past members: Greg Johnson; Brian Martin; Beau Batts; Billy Mickelson; Dallin Bulkley; Kirk Skatvold

Larry and His Flask is a self-styled "Americana-Punk" band from Bend, Oregon. a city on the Deschutes River in Oregon. They have supported several bands such as Frank Turner, Dropkick Murphys, Streetlight Manifesto, Strung Out, The Reverend Peyton's Big Damn Band and Trampled By Turtles, as well as embarking on full Canadian and American tours by themselves. Since shifting to acoustic instruments, busking has also been a part of their tours. As the group stated in an interview, "We play a lot of street corners if we are low on gas money."

They have played at various festivals; the largest to date being the 2011 Vans Warped Tour, with Alternative Press putting them on their 10 Must See Under-The-Radar Warped Tour Acts list.

== History ==
The brothers Jamin and Jesse Marshall formed the group in 2003, beginning as a 3-piece punk rock band with Greg Johnson. The name Larry and His Flask comes from a fictional character, created by Jamin Marshall around the time of the formation of the band. Jesse Marshall played electric bass at the time, Jamin Marshall was a drummer, and Greg Johnson played electric guitar. Soon, they were joined by Ian Cook, who played lead guitar. The next addition was another long-time friend, Beau Batts, replacing Jamin on drums, which brought him to the front as lead vocalist. According to the band, it "spent its first half-decade stuck in a primordial, punk-rock goop", where the goal was always "party over perfection." During this time, a number of albums were self-released with different line ups. From 2005 to 2007, the most popular of their lineups was Jamin Marshall on vocals, Jesse Marshall on bass, Ian Cook on lead guitar, Beau Batts on drums and Brian Martin on rhythm guitar. In this time, "The Lost Seamen" and "We're Going Dancin' Tonight" were released, and short tours around the surrounding states with another local band, Zombie Co-Pilot, were commonplace. Brian Martin then left, leaving Ian as the sole guitarist.

Continuing as a quartet, they continued to tour, also playing at the 2007 Vans Warped Tour. The next full-length release was "Never Long Gone!" in mid-2008, with their first full Canadian tour. However, not long after arriving back home, Beau Batts also left the band.

In late 2008, the band radically changed its sound. They switched to acoustic instruments and guitarist Ian Cook took over lead vocals, moving original vocalist Jamin Marshall back to drums. While changing the dynamic within the remaining members, guitarist Dallin Bulkley as well as mandolinist Kirk Skatvold and banjoist Andrew Carew from the now defunct Zombie Co-Pilot were recruited, as well as others from more local bands, adding multi-part harmonies to its punk rock roots to round out the new sound. It was at this point that Larry and His Flask grew to 11 members for a short time with the addition of an accordion, fiddle, and cello among other instruments before coming to the 6 that are now the current members.

The band's first full-length LP since this stylistic change, "All That We Know", was released by Silver Sprocket Bicycle Club in July 2011.

Larry and His Flask performed on the entire 2011 Vans Warped Tour and toured in support of Pentimento bands Streetlight Manifesto and Lionize on separate tours in 2011. The band then embarked on a European tour in 2012.

After appearing on the final leg of the 2012 Warped Tour, Larry and his Flask toured with international recording artist Frank Turner on his 2012 US tour and his 2013 UK tour.

In June 2014, while on tour, they had their van and equipment totalling $24,000 stolen in Cayce, SC.

== Current members ==
- Jamin Marshall - Drums, vocals
- Jeshua Marshall - Double bass, harmonica, euphonium
- Ian Cook
- Andrew Carew
- Miguel Mendoza
- Brandon Prinzing

== Discography ==
=== Full-length albums ===
- We're Going Dancing Tonight (2006)
- Never Long Gone! (2008)
- Gutted (2008)
- All That We Know (2011)
- By The Lamplight (2013)
- This Remedy (2018)
- Everything Besides (2019)

=== EPs ===
- Larry and His Flask (2010)
- Hobo's Lament (2012)

== Reviews ==
- Erie Times-News
