= Something Fierce (band) =

Texan rock band

- Origin: Houston, Texas, United States
- Genre: Punk rock
- Years active: 2002–present
- Label: Dirtnap
- Members: Stephen Garcia; Niki Sevven; Andrew Keith
- Website: www.somethingfiercemusic.com

Something Fierce is a punk rock band from Houston, Texas, formed in 2002. They have released three albums, along with several singles and split releases.

== History ==
The members of the band are Stephen Garcia (guitar and vocals), Niki Sevven (bass and vocals), and Andrew Keith (drums). Garcia was previously in Gun Crazy and Born Liars, while Sevven was previously a member of the Neckbreakers with her father Bic Crater.

They self-released their debut album, Come for the Bastards, in June 2006. They followed this with extensive touring and several single releases before releasing in 2008 their second album There are no Answers, which was picked up and reissued the following year by Dirtnap Records. Mitch Clem provided the artwork for the "Modern Girl" single. They toured nationally with The Cute Lepers.

The band's third album, Don't Be So Cruel, was released in April 2011, and was described by PopMatters, who drew comparisons with The Clash, as "strictly music to break stuff to, or at least pump your fist in the air to...a strong rallying cry". In the opinion of Mark Deming, reviewing the album for Allmusic, the songs displayed "a greater stylistic sophistication" than the first two albums. The Austin Chronicle also identified a Minutemen influence.

In 2012 the band released a split EP with Denton band Occult Detective Club.

== Discography ==
=== Albums ===
- Come for the Bastards (2006), Morphius
- There are no Answers (2008), Something Fierce
- Don't Be So Cruel (2011), Dirtnap

=== EPs ===
- Something Fierce/The Hangouts split EP (2007), Manic Attack!!!
- Something Fierce/Occult Detective Club split EP (2012), Dirtnap

=== Singles ===
- "Modern Girl" (2008), Bitchin' Riffage!
- "Where Ya Goin Man?" (2010), Action Town
