= Cincotta (disambiguation) =

Cincotta may refer to:

- Cincotta, an Italian surname
- Cincotta, California, a community in Fresno County
- Crystallaria cincotta, a fish better known as the diamond darter
