= Travels with My Amp =

Studio album by Groovie Ghoulies
- Released: 2000
- Label: Lookout!
- Producer: Mass Giorgini

Groovie Ghoulies chronology
| Fun in the Dark (1999) | Travels with My Amp (2000) | Freaks on Parade (2001) |

Travels with My Amp is an album by the American band Groovie Ghoulies, released in 2000. The band originally intended to promote the album by playing 50 concerts in 50 days in 50 states.

== Production ==
Travels with My Amp was produced by Mass Giorgini. It was the first Groovie Ghoulies album on which Scampi played drums. "Dancing Late at Night" is a cover of the Jonathan Richman song. "Boot Hill Express" is an instrumental track. "The Highwayman" is a slice-of-touring-life song. The album closes with a rendition of "Happy Birthday", which is unlisted.

== Critical reception ==
Professional ratings
Review scores
| Source | Rating |
|---|---|
| AllMusic | 4.5/5 stars |
| Deseret News | 3/4 stars |

Trouser Press praised the "extremely short, powerful bursts of punk power." Phoenix New Times concluded that Travels with My Amp is "an album about and for the road, and should be sold at every highway minimart alongside wet naps and Tic Tacs." The Albuquerque Journal called it "a gem of Ramones-inspired punk rock." The Chicago Sun-Times admired the "good, old-fashioned traditional punk venom of 'I'd Rather Be Alone (Than Be With You)', as well as the musical constants of rampaging rhythms and snotty singalong choruses."

The Cleveland Scene determined that the album "neither advances nor retreats from the Ghoulie mantra, melding the unflinching pop-punk aesthetic with Halloween shtick." Ox-Fanzine deemed it "super harmless and predictable, both lyrically and musically." The State considered the songs to be "just downright fun, memorably wacky punk."

AllMusic noted that "a sure sign of the band's songwriting development is the presence of only one cover on this album of bright pop songs."

== Track listing ==
| No. | Title | Length |
|---|---|---|
| 1. | "Boot Hill Express" |
| 2. | "Bye Bye Brain" |
| 3. | "The Highwayman" |
| 4. | "Free Bird" |
| 5. | "Hard Night's Day" |
| 6. | "Hair of Gold (And Skin of Blue)" |
| 7. | "(The Girl Is) An Unsolved Mystery" |
| 8. | "Ghoulie Family" |
| 9. | "Daughter of Frankenstein" |
| 10. | "I'd Rather Be Alone (Than Be with You)" |
| 11. | "Leprechaun Rock" |
| 12. | "Criswell Predicts..." |
| 13. | "Dancing Late at Night" |
