= Silver Sprocket =

San Francisco based indie comics publisher

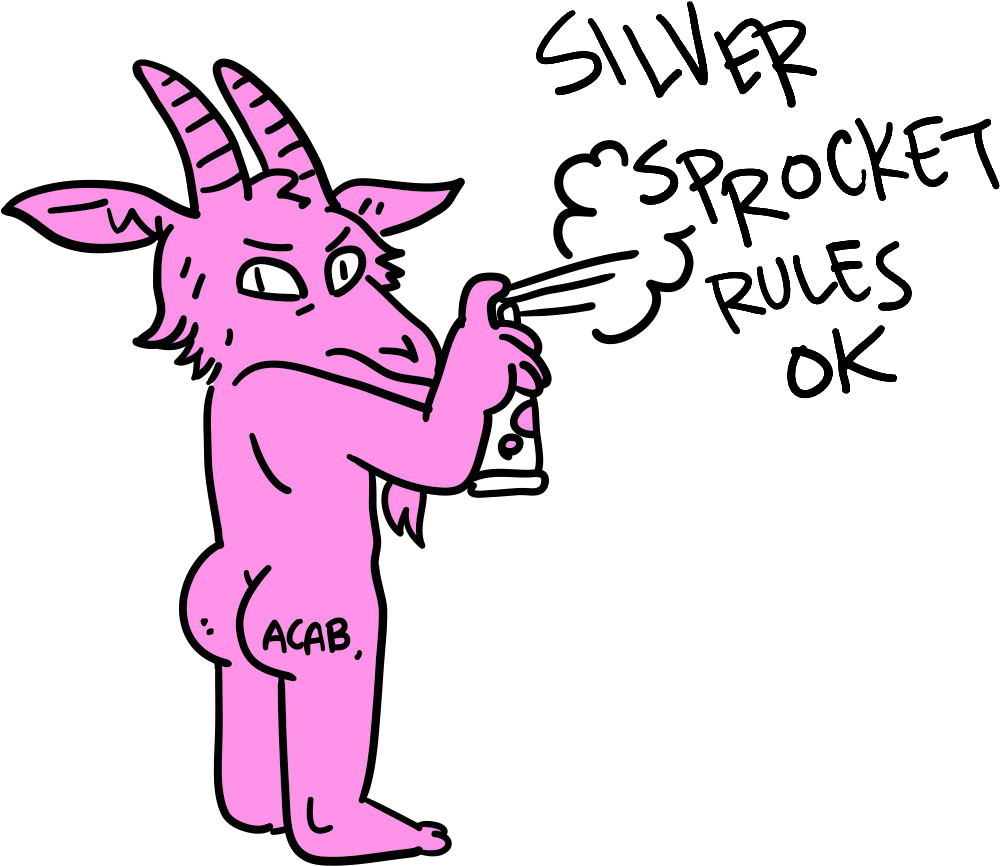
- Silver Sprocket logo drawn by Liz Suburbia.
- Status: Active
- Founded: 2007; 19 years ago
- Founder: Avi Ehrlich
- Country of origin: United States
- Headquarters location: 1685 Haight Street; San Francisco
- Key people: Ari Yarwood
- Publication types: Comics, Records
- Official website: silversprocket.net

Silver Sprocket is a San Francisco-based indie comics publisher and independent record label, founded in 2007 by Avi Ehrlich of Springman Records. In addition to publishing records and comics, Silver Sprocket also supports a range of independent musicians and other community-based initiatives.

== Overview ==
Silver Sprocket is an anti-professional art crew, comic and zine publisher, record label, and "all-around raging dumpster fire." Ehrlich told The Comics Journal that the community-based model of the company is founded in anarchist politics: "It's very shaped by anarchist world views and specifically the Bay Area punk rock scene which was a very hippieish community of mutual aid and helping each other out and not waiting for permission from some corporation to exist." Comics critics have noted the publisher's high production values differentiates Silver Sprocket from other zine publishers. "Its political values may be DIY and anti-establishment, but its attention to production values and design sets it apart from traditional, home-made zines." Silver Sprocket is known for publishing comics about punk culture, mental illness, queer lives, and people of color.

Silver Sprocket opened their first retail location in December 2017 at 1685 Haight Street, San Francisco. In 2021, Ari Yarwood was hired as Silver Sprocket's first managing editor.

In early 2025, financial burdens became unmanagable, leading to the somewhat sudden layoff of three employees as well as friction on social media.

== Musicians ==
The following musicians have released albums under the Silver Sprocket label:

- Andrew Jackson Jihad
- Ashtray
- Big D and the Kids Table
- Blackbird Raum
- Blatz
- Bobby Joe Ebola and the Children MacNuggits
- Filth
- Larry and His Flask
- Pain
- The Phenomenauts
- The Pillowfights
- River City Rebels
- Shang-A-Lang
- Vic Ruggiero

Additionally, the label has released the following compilation albums:

- Rude Remix Revolution (2009)

== Cartoonists ==
- Eddy Atoms
- Caroline Cash
- Mitch Clem
- Benji Nate
- Ben Passmore (Your Black Friend, 2018)
- Liz Suburbia
- Sam Szabo
- Jenn Woodall
