= The Rocky Horror Punk Rock Show =

Compilation album
- Released: September 30, 2003
- Genre: Punk
- Length: 48:03
- Label: Springman Records

Professional ratings
Review scores
Source	Rating
Allmusic	3/5 stars

The Rocky Horror Punk Rock Show is a tribute album featuring the soundtrack of the 1975 cult film The Rocky Horror Picture Show performed by modern punk rock bands, released on Springman Records in 2003.

== Background ==
The album started as a project by Shawn "Eddie Migraine" Browning, who got the idea from his wife. Work for the project started in 1999. Browning said he was a "huge Rocky Horror fan back in High School", and that the show was "where some of us fit in" and "brought us all together".

== Critical reception ==
A Punk News reviewer said "while a number of songs suffer from sub-par recordings [or sub-par arrangements], there are some highlights".

== Track listing ==
1. "Science Fiction/Double Feature" - Me First and the Gimme Gimmes
2. "Dammit, Janet" - Love Equals Death
3. "Over at the Frankenstein Place" - Alkaline Trio
4. "The Time Warp" - The Groovie Ghoulies
5. "Sweet Transvestite" - Apocalypse Hoboken
6. "The Sword of Damocles" - The Independents
7. "I Can Make You a Man" - Pansy Division
8. "Hot Patootie (Bless My Soul)" - The Phenomenauts
9. "I Can Make You A Man (Reprise)" - The Secretions
10. "Touch-A, Touch-A, Touch Me" - Chubbies
11. "Once in a While" - Big D and the Kids Table
12. "Eddie's Teddy" - Swingin' Utters
13. "Planet, Schmanet, Janet" - Tsunami Bomb
14. "Rose Tint My World/Floor Show" - Luckie Strike
15. "Fanfare/Don't Dream It" - Stunt Monkey
16. "Wild and Untamed Thing" - Gametime
17. "I'm Going Home" - The Migranes
18. "Super Heroes" - Ruth's Hat
19. "Science Fiction Double Feature (Reprise)" - The Ataris

== Personnel ==
Artists and repertoire for this album was done by Eddie Migrane of The Migranes and Avi Ehrlich of Springman Records. Artwork by Steve Rolston.
