= Amazing Transparent Man =

American punk band

- Origin: DeKalb, Illinois
- Genres: Punk rock, pop punk
- Years active: 1997–2004
- Labels: Springman
- Past members: Rick Muermann; Tony D'Amato; Chris Johnson; Brad Riverdahl; Casey Sons

Amazing Transparent Man was a pop-punk band on the Springman Records label from 1997 to 2004. They hailed from DeKalb, Illinois. The original members were Rick Muermann (guitar/vocals), Tony D'Amato (guitar/vocals), Brad Riverdahl (drums) and Casey Sons (bass guitar). Casey left the band shortly after their first album and bass guitar duties were subsequently shared by Rick and Tony as ATM became a trio for the rest of their career. For quite a while, their signature uniform included pink shorts and white tank tops. The band once served milk and cookies to all audience members in attendance at the CD release show for their second full-length album The Measure of All Things at the popular Cabaret Metro in Chicago.

They underwent a couple of member changes throughout the years and eventually released four full-length albums, an EP of cover songs by popular female artists, and appeared on countless compilation CDs from the late '90s through 2004. The final line-up included:

- Rick Muermann (guitar/bass/vocals),
- Tony D'Amato (guitar/bass/vocals), and
- Chris Johnson (drums).

== Discography ==
=== Albums ===
- No Fun Intended (1998), Lab Rat Records
- The Measure of All Things (2001), Springman Records
- The Death of the Party (2002), Springman Records
- Print Is Dead (2004), Suburban Home Records

=== EPs ===
- Taking Back the Covers EP (2003), Springman Records
