= Theo Logian =

American musician

- Genre: Punk rock
- Occupation: Senior Operations Engineer / IT Manager
- Instruments: Drums, Bass
- Labels: Dummyup Records, Clearview Records

Theo Logian is an American musician.

Theo moved to San Francisco from Arizona in 1994 to become a rock star. Nothing Cool later hit the charts in Japan.

== Musical career ==
The Started-its, Theo Logian Explosion, Worth Taking, Nothing Cool, Belt Fight, Fabulous Disaster, The Razorburns, Reducer SF, The Dread, Teenage Harlets, Lugosi, The Home Alones, Baron Automatic, Critical Mess, John Brady Illegitimate Children (JB), Texas Thieves, Five Shitty Fingers, Alleged Masterminds.

== Current Projects ==
Theo Logian has been messing up music for many decades now. He first met Joe Phort in 2008, when he booked a European tour with Will Farley and Neil Durkin to play with Nothing Cool. After that tour, the 4 men wrote and recorded the first Theo Logian Explosion E.P. to tour in Japan during the winter of 2009. Once they returned to the United States, Theo and Joe continued their "music" with a new band titled The Started-Its (featuring George Rider on bass guitar). Since the release of Meet The Started-its, the band introduced a new bassist, Seiji Kurauchi. Currently, this band plays shows in the San Francisco Bay Area a few times each year.

== Dummyup Records ==
Jeremy and Theo decided to save some money and put out some records.

== Dummyup Records Discography ==
Nothing Cool

- What a Wonderful World

The Dread

- The Dread

Baron Automatic

- Way Funner

Grease

- The Not So Original Soundtrack

== Discography ==
Nothing Cool

- Taking Advantage of Stupid People (1999) – drums, vocals
- What a Wonderful World (1997) – drums, vocals
- Losers Hall Of Fame (1995) – drums, vocals
- Idiot Word Search w/ The Lillingtons (1996) – drums, vocals
- Nothing Cool / The Lillingtons (1996) – drums, vocals
- The Unluckiest Man In The Universe (1997) – drums, vocals
- Don't Tell Me What to Do (1995) – drums, vocals

Teenage Harlets

- Best Dae (2002) – Bass, vocals

The Dread

- Bonnie and Clyde (2000) – drums, vocals

The Started-its

- Meet The Started-its (2011) – drums, vocals

The Logian Explosion

- The Logian Explosion (2010) – drums, vocals

Worth Taking

- Oddly Pacific (2013) – drums, vocals

Belt Fight

- Belt Fight (1997) – drums, bass, vocals

John Brady's Illegitimate Children

- You Asked For It! (1994) – drums
