= Tomato Head Records =

American independent record label

- Founded: 1996
- Founder: Chuck Phelps
- Genre: Punk rock, ska punk, pop punk
- Country of origin: U.S.
- Location: San Francisco, California
- Official website: tomatoheadrecords.com

Tomato Head Records was an independent record label started by Chuck Phelps after his split with the ska punk band Skankin' Pickle and Dill Records. The label most notably released the debut EP of Tsunami Bomb, The Invasion from Within! and the Luckie Strike EP, Future is Turning. The label is now in indefinite hiatus.

== Former bands ==
- The Adjustments
- Blindspot
- The Jamons
- Link 80
- Lesdystics
- Luckie Strike
- My New Life
- Nicotine
- The Peacocks
- The Rayguns
- Tsunami Bomb
- The Wunder Years
- Young Punch

== See also ==
- List of record labels
