= Nothing Nice to Say =

Web comics series

- Author(s): Mitch Clem, Joe Briggs
- Website: MitchClem.com/NothingNice (cybersquatted); (archive at archive.org)
- Current status/schedule: Inactive (since 2014)
- Launch date: February 25, 2002
- Genres: Comedy: Subversive; Political; Punk
- Followed by: San Antonio Rock City

Nothing Nice to Say is a webcomic, touted as "The world's FIRST online punk comic", created by artist Mitch Clem. It is sometimes abbreviated as Nothing Nice, NNTS or NN2S.

== Synopsis ==
First launched online in February 2002, Nothing Nice To Say follows roommates Blake and Fletcher, while living in Minneapolis, Minnesota, as they make fun of punk rock, punk rock fans, and just about everything relating to the punk subculture, including themselves. Although it follows a standard 3-panel webcomic setup of two roommates, one of whom is slightly off-the-wall, it was seminal for placing them in a punk setting.

== History ==
During much of the comic's existence, Mitch used the space under the comic as his blog. Now his blog can be found at his LiveJournal (See Link Below).

Clem's blogs began to show that he was likely suffering bouts of depression. Because of this he was mocked on the comic's own discussion forum; the internet traffic for which had rapidly outgrown the traffic for the comic strip. This is allegedly one of the reasons that Mitch- somewhat unceremoniously – ended the comic in 2004. At this time, Mitch told fans he would be collaborating on a strip called Joe and Monkey with fellow webcomic artist Zach Miller.

Clem left Joe and Monkey before the series even launched, but did return to take over writing and illustration duties for the entire month of January 2005, at which point Mitch announced he would resurrect Nothing Nice in what would become the now familiar black and white format, as opposed to the original run, which was in color.

Updates slowed sometime after January 2006, when Clem began focusing his energy on a new autobiographical strip called San Antonio Rock City. Eventually, Nothing Nice was put on indefinite hiatus and SARC became Clem's main focus.

Mitch Clem stated that he was unopposed to bringing back Nothing Nice (though perhaps at a less frequent schedule), and stayed true to this statement when he brought it back on a weekly schedule on August 28, 2006. Updates ranged from sporadic to nonexistent for a while as the focus shifted from SARC to NN2S and back. Clem eventually quit San Antonio Rock City after breaking up with his then-girlfriend who served as the series' co-star, and turned his focus back to Nothing Nice, where it continued to update on a mostly regular thrice weekly schedule. Nothing Nice went back on temporary hiatus as Clem began work on another autobiographical strip, My Stupid Life. Nothing Nice to Say resumed on September 15, 2008, then was placed on hiatus since December 23, 2008, and resumed again on September 5, 2011 with a new co-writer, Joe Briggs.

== Main cast ==
=== Blake ===
Blake and Fletcher as they appeared in the early strips

One of the comic's main characters. He is named after Blake Schwarzenbach of Jawbreaker and Jets to Brazil fame (also has an obvious resemblance to Jawbreaker-era Schwarzenbach), and is a great fan of both bands. Tends to be the voice of reason of the two main characters. Besides Schwarzenbach bands, he is also a fan of pop-punk bands and even some indie rock bands. Played guitar in a band with Fletcher, called The Negative Adjectives. He has a shrine to Henry Rollins in his bedroom, something Fletcher was unaware of until September 13, 2006. Blake is considered by many fans to represent a sort of "parallel universe Mitch", or is at least modelled on the comic's author; the parallels between certain of their life events and their shared tastes and opinions are used as evidence for this.

=== Fletcher ===
Blake's bald-headed roommate. Did not originally have a name; instead he was named through a reader contest. Tends to come up with some fairly crazy and somewhat anti-social ideas, sometimes resulting in litigation. He is also sometimes attracted to irritating behaviors and habits simply for their ability to anger others, such as his taking up smoking. Often wears a band shirt that reads "BAND". Is a fan of 1980s hardcore punk. Played drums for The Negative Adjectives. Recently contracted a case of "pop punk" at a show. He is often a comic foil to Blake's role as straightman and the two most often provide the main thrust of the series' plotlines.

=== Phillip ===
Originally a ska fan, he now listens to emo and vehemently denies having ever liked ska at all; this is plotted by the author to make fun of what he perceives to be the trend-hopping nature of most modern-day emo fans. Blames the female gender for most of his problems, even though they actually tend to be self-inflicted. Also seems to exude "whiny bitch pheromones" which make it impossible to stay around him for any longer time without resorting to physical violence. He started out 2007 by renouncing emo in favor of what he felt was less depressing pop-punk, but after buying the newest pop punk album (implied to be the album "Hospitals" by Off With Their Heads), he hanged himself in his apartment. His name is a reference to the comedian Emo Philips.

=== Cecil ===
An anthropomorphic gopher (refential to the strip's setting of the Twin Cities of Minnesota.) Very sarcastic, and at one time insulted people for spare change. According to the comic, has played bass for Screeching Weasel, roadied for Fifteen and secretly written songs for The Donnas. Played bass for The Negative Adjectives before he quit right before their first show. Cecil has apparently rejoined the band since Joe Banks (see below) joined. Usually seen wearing a Quincy Punx shirt.

=== Charlie/Chris ===
A vegan, hardcore-crust punk. The rest of the cast tends to walk on egg shells around him due to his veganism, as they're afraid they might upset him if he so much as touches an object that has been in contact with dairy products. He has been referred to as both "Charlie" and "Chris," an error that Clem has jokingly acknowledged.

=== Karen ===
A radical feminist (riot grrrl). Spends a lot of her time getting upset at Blake and Fletcher for allegedly objectifying female punk rock band members, yet started dating Alice only because a "strong lesbian stance" would improve her image as a feminist.

=== Joe ===
The comic's youngest character. He's a skater and tends to get made fun of by Blake and Fletcher, as they see most skaters as "corporate whores". He confused buttons of fashion companies with wearing "cool" buttons of punk bands.

=== Joe Banks ===
In 2005, Nothing Nice To Say and Joe and Monkey had a crossover, featuring Joe, the titular hero of the latter, auditioning for Blake and Fletcher's band, The Negative Adjectives (after seeing a poster written by Fletcher proclaiming that the band needed no new members). Banks was accepted as the band's new singer and second guitarist and has since been featured in strips featuring the band performing.

== Spin-offs and related content ==
=== San Antonio Rock City ===
San Antonio Rock City, or SARC, was an autobiographical webcomic about Mitch and his weekly exploits with then-girlfriend Victoria. This comic was updated consistently several times each week, eventually going daily, for approx 6 months, and featured several references to Nothing Nice, including a strip with cameos of Blake, Fletcher, Cecil, Joe Banks, and the Anarchist Fan. Mitch quit the series permanently after he and Victoria broke up in early 2007.

=== The Coffee Achievers ===
The Coffee Achievers originally started out as Nothing Nice story arc, but later turned into its own comic as a collaboration with Joe Dunn, from Joe Loves Crappy Movies. The cast is mostly the same as that of Nothing Nice, but with small alterations, and is not considered to take place in the same universe as the main strip.

The Coffee Achievers began a working relationship between Clem and Joe Dunn that has now developed into a partnership, with Dunn serving as Clem's go-to colorist for his prolific work creating concert fliers and album art. The two have also expressed plans to eventually team up again for Clem's long-planned post-apocalyptic saga, The Rain Dogs.

=== Publications ===
On February 19, 2008, Mitch announced on his MySpace blog and his Livejournal that Dark Horse Comics would be publishing the long-awaited physical copy of NN2S. The book contained:

- All Nothing Nice comics from 2006–2007
- Over 40 pages of guest strips Mitch has done for other comics (including his month-long stint for Joe and Monkey)
- Redrawn strips from the early years to introduce new readers to characters
- Illustrations separating the different sections of the book

The book was released in October 2008. It is now out of print.

Years later, on January 9, 2019, Silver Sprocket published a "complete, definitive collection" of NN2S, titled Nothing Nice to Say: Complete Discography. The book contains:

- The entire archive of Nothing Nice, minus a few strips
- Drawings that never appeared on the site
- Crossovers with other webcomics at the time
- The full run of The Coffee Achievers

Mitch has also created original Nothing Nice comics for Razorcake Magazine, and for MySpace Dark Horse Presents, while strips from the web have been reprinted in countless fanzines.

== Criticism and analysis ==
Nothing Nice To Say was used along with Penny Arcade and American Elf as an example of comics using the web to create "an explosion of diverse genres and styles" in Scott McCloud's book Making Comics
