= Mitch Clem =

American cartoonist (born 1982)

Mitch Andrew Clem
- Born: September 15, 1982 (age 43); Minneapolis, Minnesota, U.S.
- Occupation: Cartoonist

Mitch Andrew Clem (born September 15, 1982) is an American cartoonist best known for his web comics Nothing Nice to Say, San Antonio Rock City, and My Stupid Life.

== Biography ==
=== Early life ===
Clem was born in Minneapolis, on September 15, 1982. He moved around through various locations in Minnesota, including Coon Rapids, Brooklyn Park, Andover, Melrose, Duluth, and St. Cloud. He says that this is a result of his "rampant inability to sit still for more than six months at a time."

Clem became interested in comic strips as a child, reading the newspaper strips. He cites Calvin and Hobbes and The Far Side as the most influential on him in those days. He also credits Looney Tunes as being a childhood influence on his interest in cartooning.

In the later part of elementary school, he began developing an interest in superhero comics Batman and the Flash. In high school, his interest in comic books grew to include what he calls "really weird indie books," The Tick, Johnny the Homicidal Maniac, Sandman, Milk & Cheese, and the crime works of Brian Michael Bendis. He had no interest in superheroes at that time, until he read Watchmen, Batman: The Dark Knight Returns, and Daredevil: Guardian Devil.

=== Present ===
In the summer of 2005, Clem moved from Minneapolis to San Antonio, where he currently resides with his wife (married 2020) and frequent art collaborator Nation of Amanda, as well as his daughter, Mary Lou. He works full-time as a cartoonist and freelance illustrator.

== Works ==
=== Summer's Over ===
Mitch Clem's career as a cartoonist and writer first took published form in the late 1990s with his zine, Summer's Over, of which he published ten issues. He put out his last issue in 2001, when he switched his focus from print to webcomics with the launch of Nothing Nice to Say.

=== Nothing Nice to Say ===
On February 25, 2002, Clem first published the strip for which he is best known, Nothing Nice to Say, which follows Minneapolis punks Blake and Fletcher.

The comic has survived many hiatuses (the lengthiest lasting from August 14, 2004, to January 31, 2005) and much artistic evolution (probably the most drastic change being a switch from full-color to black and white comics, a decision Clem credits partially to discovering his being partially colorblind), but it remains, to this day, one of the longest lasting comics on the internet. The strip is updated on an arbitrary basis.

Dark Horse Comics published an anthology of his Nothing Nice to Say "Volume 2" comic strip in October, 2008. This book is now out of print. In 2018, Silver Sprocket published a complete collection of the full series (including its spinoff series The Coffee Achievers), titled Nothing Nice to Say: Complete Discography.

=== The Coffee Achievers ===
While working on Nothing Nice, Clem also teamed up with fellow web comic artist Joe Dunn, of Joe Loves Crappy Movies. Together they worked on the short series The Coffee Achievers, which totaled nine chapters. Achievers ran from February 1, 2005, to February 10, 2006.

=== San Antonio Rock City ===
On January 22, 2006, Clem launched his first autobiographical comic series San Antonio Rock City, which centered on him and his then-girlfriend Victoria after moving to San Antonio, TX from Minnesota. The strip followed a four-panel format arranged in a square with using the first for the title panel showing Clem and Victoria, parodying American Gothic. Occasionally, there are a few six-strip comics. San Antonio Rock City was his main focus for a while until he canceled it due to his split with his girlfriend Victoria. The entire series will be collected in the upcoming book My Stupid Life, Vol. 1 from New Reliable Press.

=== My Stupid Life ===
On January 16, 2008, Clem began his newest series, My Stupid Life. As the name implies, the strip is autobiographical, in a style reminiscent of San Antonio Rock City. The comic also co-stars his fiancée, Amanda (Nation of Amanda). Amanda sometimes colors the strips in watercolors.

On April 15, 2009, Clem announced on his blog that he would be releasing a new book, My Stupid Life: Volume One, through New Reliable Press in the Fall of 2009. The book would collect the current run of My Stupid Life, as well as the complete San Antonio Rock City series, Clem's first foray into autobiographical comics.

=== Turnstile Comix ===
December 2010 saw the release of the first issue of Clem's first direct-to-print comic series, Turnstile Comix. Each issue in the series would highlight one band and would pair a comic book of true stories about the band with a 7" featuring previously unreleased songs by them. The first issue starred Minneapolis punk band The Slow Death. The second issue, released in late 2012, featured The World/Inferno Friendship Society. The third issue, released in 2014, featured Lemuria.

=== As You Were ===
In 2013, Clem created and began curating a "punk comix anthology" zine called As You Were. Each issue features a centralized theme, based upon which a variety of cartoonists from punk scenes all over the world would create unique comics. It is Clem's most critically acclaimed project to-date, having been praised by the likes of NPR, USA Today, Maximumrockandroll, The A.V. Club, and Razorcake. Three issues have been published as of April 2014, and have included comics by Mitch Clem, Liz Prince, Ben Snakepit, Ramsey Beyer, Liz Suburbia, Cathy G. Johnson, Will Laren, and others.

=== Other work ===
Clem regularly makes concert flyers and album covers for punk rock bands. He has also made album covers for the bands The Ergs!, Andrew WK, The Steinways, Shang-A-Lang, Bomb the Music Industry!, Something Fierce, and others. He also created the art for every record in Vinyl Collective's Under the Influence series, featuring Lemuria, Off With Their Heads, Drag the River, Fake Problems, These Arms Are Snakes, and more.

His artwork is commissioned regularly for Razorcake magazine and the Kansas City Pitch. He also authors Punk Matters, a monthly column about punk music in the San Antonio Current.

On June 25, 2007, Clem's blog Rain of Bastards was selected by the editors of PC World magazine for their article "100 Blogs We Love".

== In print ==
=== Collections ===
- Nothing Nice to Say (2008, Dark Horse Comics) (out of print)
- Nothing Nice to Say: Complete Discography (2018, Silver Sprocket)
- My Stupid Life (2023, Silver Sprocket)

=== Anthologies ===
- You Ain't No Dancer, Vol. 2 (2006, New Reliable Press)
- You Ain't No Dancer, Vol. 3 (2008, New Reliable Press)
- Side B: The Music Lover's Comic Anthology (2009, Poseur Ink)
- Myspace Dark Horse Presents (2009, Dark Horse Comics)
- As You Were, Vol. 1 (2013, Silver Sprocket Bicycle Club)
- As You Were, Vol. 2 (2013, Silver Sprocket Bicycle Club)
- As You Were, Vol. 3 (2014, Silver Sprocket Bicycle Club)
