= Bay Area Science Festival =

Annual science festival held in the San Francisco Bay Area

The Bay Area Science Festival (BASF) is an annual science festival started in 2011 that takes place in the San Francisco Bay Area counties every year at the end of October/beginning of November. The BASF program features over 50 events each year. The program typically features large free hands-on science days called Discovery Days, one in the North Bay, one in the East Bay, and one at Oracle Park in San Francisco. Additionally, the program features lab tours, conversations with leading scientists, and performances from groups from around the nation. In 2013, around 70,000 people attended, which was a 30% increase from the year before.

BASF planning is headquartered at the University of California, San Francisco. BASF's founder is former National Academy of Sciences president Bruce Alberts, and its director in 2011 was Kishore Hari. Principal institutional sponsors have included Chevron, Genentech, and UC San Francisco and funding has been provided in part, from the National Science Foundation.

The 10th BASF was held from October 21−25, 2020 as a virtual event, but online event due to the first year of COVID-19 pandemic. The 11th BASF was held from October 20-24, 2021 as a virtual event, but it was cancelled due to the highly transmissible Deltacron hybrid variant. However, after the first two years of the pandemic, the 12th BASF was held from October 26-30, 2022 as a virtual event again.
