= Groovie Ghoulies =

American pop punk band

- Origin: Sacramento, California, United States
- Genres: Punk rock, pop punk, horror punk
- Years active: 1983–2007
- Labels: Lookout!, Springman, Stardumb, Green Door, Eccentric Pop
- Past members: Kepi; Roach; Scampi; Wendy
- Website: groovie-ghoulies.com

The Groovie Ghoulies were an American pop punk band from Sacramento, California, United States, whose music took inspiration from horror movies. They released numerous albums, EPs, and singles, and toured internationally. The band's name was taken from the 1970s animated television series Groovie Goolies, a spinoff of Sabrina, the Teenage Witch.

== History ==
Though the group's lineup fluctuated significantly throughout their career, bassist/vocalist Jeff Alexander better known under the punk name Kepi Ghoulie remained a constant fixture. Guitarist Rochelle "Roach" Sparman was also a longtime member. Alexander and Sparman were married but eventually divorced, which lead to difficulties in keeping the band together and its eventual breakup. The Groovie Ghoulies' music is best classified as pop-punk and is heavily influenced by early punk groups such as the Ramones, the Misfits, and The Dickies, 1960s garage rock and bubblegum artists such as The Troggs and The Monkees, and 1950s rock and roll artists such as Chuck Berry and Jerry Lee Lewis. Throughout their career the Groovie Ghoulies recorded cover versions of songs by several of these artists as well as other influences including Kiss, Daniel Johnston and Neil Diamond.

The Groovie Ghoulies announced their breakup on May 9, 2007, just days prior to the release of their ninth studio album 99 Lives.

In 2008, two tribute albums were released. Let's Go Ghoulie from US-based Knowhere Records and When The Kids Go Go Go Crazy on German label Kamikaze Records each featured artists from Europe and North America.

Lead singer Kepi has recorded cover versions of Groovie Ghoulies songs on various releases since the band's breakup. Fun In The Dark with The Accelerators was released in 2015; Re-Animation Festival, with The Copyrights, was released in 2019.

In September 2022, Kepi announced that the entire Groovie Ghoulies back catalogue would be released via Pirates Press.

== Former band members ==
- Jeff (Kepi) Alexander – bass, lead vocals (original and final line up)
- Rochelle (Roach) Sparman – guitar, backing vocals (final line up)
- Nora (Scampi) Fasano – drums, backing vocals (final line up)
- John (Rudge) Rudgers – guitar (original line up)
- Geolyn Carvin – guitar, backing vocals (original line up)
- John (Vetty) Vetter – bass (original line up)
- John Phillip (Johny) Sosa – drums (original line up)
- John Harris – drums
- Dan (Panic) Sullivan – drums
- Wendy Powell – drums, backing vocals
- B-Face Rat – bass
- Matt K. Shrugg – drums
- Jaz Brown – drums
- Dan Reynoso (Danny Secretion) – drums
- Jason Patrone – bass (quit after 2 weeks)
- Skid Jones – guitar
- Amy – Drums
- Brian – Drums
- Dave – Drums
- Andrew Phillips – guitar

== Discography ==
=== Albums ===
Year	Title	Label	Format	Other information
1989	Appetite for Adrenochrome	Crimson Corpse Records	LP/CD	First album. Re-released in 1996 by Lookout! Records, in 2003 by Springman Records, and in 2015 by Green Door Records and Eccentric Pop Records.
1994	Born in the Basement	Green Door Records	LP/CD	Re-released in 1996 by Lookout! Records and in 2004 by Springman Records.
1996	World Contact Day	Lookout! Records	LP/CD	Re-released in 2002 by Springman Records.
1997	Re-Animation Festival	Lookout! Records	LP/CD	Re-released in 2003 by Springman Records.
1999	Fun in the Dark	Lookout! Records	LP/CD	Re-released in 2003 by Springman Records.
2000	Travels with My Amp	Lookout! Records	LP/CD	
2002	Go! Stories	Stardumb Records	LP/CD	Re-released with bonus tracks in 2002 by Green Door Records.
2003	Monster Club	Stardumb Records	CD	Re-released in 2004 by Green Door Records.
2007	99 Lives	Green Door Records	CD	Final album.
2014	Flying Saucer Rock N Roll	Green Door Records, Eccentric Pop Records	LP/CD	First three 7"s remastered onto a full-length LP

=== EPs ===
Year	Title	Label	Format	Other information
1997	"Planet Brian Jones"	Supersonic RefrigeRecords	7"	Italy Release
2001	Freaks on Parade	Stardumb Records	CD	Re-released on vinyl by Surfin' Ki Records in 2014.
2001	Summer Fun with the Groovie Ghoulies	Green Door Records	CD	2001 tour CD with Fanzine
2002	Summer Fun 2002	Green Door Records	CD	2002 tour CD with Fanzine
2005	Berry'd Alive	Green Door Records	CD/10"	Covers of songs originally performed by Chuck Berry.

=== Singles ===
Year	Title	Label	Format	Other information
1986	"Flying Saucer"	Crimson Corpse Records	7"	Groovie Ghoulies first release
1988	"Don't Go Out Into the Rain"	Crimson Corpse Records	7"	Side B: Dead Moon/Child of the Moon
1988	"Armageddon 2000"	Crimson Corpse Records	7"	
1990	"Hello Hello"	Crimson Corpse Records	7"	
1992	"Lost Generation"	Gift of Life	7"	
1992	"Christmas on Mars"	Crimson Corpse Records	7"	
1995	"The Beast with 5 Hands"	Green Door Records	7"	
1996	"Island of Pogo Pogo"	Lookout! Records	7"	Lookout No. 146 Side B:"Gates of Steel"
1997	"Magic 8 Ball"	What Else?	7"	
1997	"Running With Bigfoot"	Lookout! Records	CD/ 7"	Lookout No. 177
1997	"Graveyard Girlfriend"	Lookout! Records	7"	Side B: Trick or Treat (Chuck Berry)/Devil Town (Daniel Johnston)
2000	"Vampire Girl"	Supersonic RefrigeRecords	7"	Picture Disc Italy Release

=== Splits ===
Year	Title	Label	Format	Other information
2004	Cake Sprit EP	Stingray	7"	4-way split Groovie Ghoulies/The Spazzys/Dazes/Mach Pelican
1997	3 for the Price of One	Sell Out	7"	Groovie Ghoulies/Wankin' Teenagers/Receivers split
1998	Chronic for the Troops	Delmonico	CD/7"	Split with Chixdiggit!
1998	"Funny Funny"	Gearhead Records	7"	RPM No. 007 – b/w The Donnas "Wig-Wam Bam"
1999	Wedding Invitation	What Else?	12"	heart shaped vinyl made for a wedding invitation. Lynrd's Innards/Groovie Ghoulies/Slingshot Episode split
2004	'Til Death do us Party	Springman Records	7"	Split with the Secretions

=== Compilation albums ===
- Tantrum – 1990 LP/CD
- Gabba Gabba Hey – 1991 CD
- Groin Thunder – 1992 CD
- Heide Sez – 1996 CD
- Team Mint – 1996 CD
- Back Asswards – 1996 CD
- More Bounce to the Ounce – 1997 CD
- The Last Great Thing You Did – 1997 CD
- Psycho Sisters – 1998 CD
- Forward Til Death – 1999 CD
- Built For Speed – 1999 CD
- Short Music For Short People – 1999 CD
- Runnin' On Fumes – 2000 CD
- Lookout! Freakout – 2000 CD
- 3 Chord Rocket Science – 2001 CD
- A Tribute to NOFX – 2002 CD
- A Punk Tribute to AC/DC – 2002 CD
- Third Strike Punk Rock Strike Volume Three – 2002 CD
- A Fistful of Rock N Roll Vol. No. 10 – 2002 CD
- Pop Punk Loves You – 2002 CD
- The Rocky Horror Punk Rock Show – 2003 CD
- Punk Rock High School Int. – 2004 CD
- MolokoPlus No. 26 – 2004 CD
- Volume 4: Pop Punk – 2005 CD
- Backyard City Rockers 3 – 2005 CD
