= Springman Records =

American independent music label

Springman Records is an independent record label founded in 1998 by Avi Ehrlich that was run out of his parents' garage in Cupertino, California, until late 2005, when Ehrlich moved the label to Sacramento. The label's official slogan is "Friendly Punks" though many other styles of music appear on the label, such as indie rock, rockabilly, ska, folk music, pop punk, and hardcore.

In 2007, Springman stopped releasing albums, but launched Silver Sprocket, a bicycle club that also releases records with a more collective and community-oriented philosophy. Silver Sprocket members jokingly refer to themselves as a cult on their Myspace page.

The group has been involved in political and community-related projects around Sacramento. As an imprint, Silver Sprocket has released albums, clothing, toys, and art-related projects.

Now based in Ehrlich's San Francisco Victorian, Silver Sprocket's business side works with numerous bands and graphic artists, including Mitch Clem of the Nothing Nice To Say webcomic to release his merchandise and managing his record label, Face Palm Records.

== Roster ==
- Amazing Transparent Man
- The Albert Square
- Andrew Jackson Jihad
- Ashtray
- Attaboy
- Big D and the Kids Table
- Blatz
- Brickfight
- Dan O'Day (Bopper of River City Rebels)
- dj BC
- Enda
- Filth
- Go Real Slow
- The Groovie Ghoulies
- The Gunshy
- Jason Webley
- Hard Girls
- Mitch Clem
- The New Trust
- Pain
- The Phenomenauts
- The Pillowfights
- Pteradon
- River City Rebels
- The Rum Diary
- The Secretions
- Shang-A-Lang
- Shower with Goats
- Sorry About the Fire
- The Teenage Harlets
- Tera Melos
- The Thorns Of Life
- The Tigermilks
- The Whyioughtas
- The Wunder Years

== Other projects ==
The label has also released compilation CDs and assorted projects featuring bands such as Alkaline Trio, The Ataris, Down By Law, Mates of State, Me First and the Gimme Gimmes, No Use for a Name, Swingin' Utters, Thrice, Tsunami Bomb and Xiu Xiu.

- The Rocky Horror Punk Rock Show compilation album
- Punk Rock Holocaust film
- Punk Rock Strike Vol. 4 compilation for Gogol Bordello
- Pounded miniseries soundtrack

== See also ==
- List of record labels
