= Hurt discography =

- Studio albums: 6
- Extended plays: 3
- Singles: 8
- Video albums: 1
- Music videos: 4

The following is a discography of albums, singles, music videos, downloads, and unreleased tracks by the American rock band Hurt. Since 2000, the band has released six studio albums and eight singles. Hurt (sometimes typeset as HURT) is an alternative metal band formed in 2000 in Virginia but that is now located out of Los Angeles, California, United States. Currently signed with independent label Carved Records, the band has put out four major label albums. The group consists of lead singer J. Loren Wince, guitarist Michael Roberts, bassist Rek Mohr, and drummer Victor Ribas.

== Studio albums ==
Year	Album details	Peak chart positions		
Year	Album details	US	US Heat.	US Ind.
2000	HURT: Released: 2000	—	—	—
2003	The Consumation: Released: 2003	—	—	—
2006	Vol. I: Released: March 21, 2006; Label: Capitol	175	7	—
2007	Vol. II: Released: September 25, 2007; Label: Capitol	101	1	—
2009	Goodbye to the Machine: Released: April 7, 2009; Label: Amusement	112	1	6
2012	The Crux: Released: May 1, 2012; Label: Carved	71	—	9
"—" denotes a release that did not chart.

== Compilation albums ==
Year	Album details	Peak chart positions		
Year	Album details	US	US Heat.	US Ind.
2015	"Besides & Footnotes": Released: April 24, 2015	—	—	—
"—" denotes a release that did not chart.

== Extended plays ==
Year	EP details
2007	The Blackmarket EP: Released: 2007
2008	The Re-Consumation: Released: 2008; Label: Adrenaline Music
2014	Self-Entitled: Released: 2014

== Singles ==
Year	Song	Peak chart positions			Album
Year	Song	US Alt.	US Main.	US Rock	Album
2006	"Rapture"	—	17	—	Vol. I
2006	"Falls Apart"	—	16	—	Vol. I
2007	"Ten Ton Brick"	28	6	—	Vol. II
2007	"Loded"	—	33	—	Vol. II
2009	"Wars"	—	20	—	Goodbye to the Machine
2009	"Pills"	—	—	—	Goodbye to the Machine
2010	"Numbers"	—	—	—	Non-album single
2012	"How We End Up Alone"	—	18	29	The Crux
2012	"Caught in the Rain"	—	—	—	The Crux
"—" denotes a release that did not chart.

== Music videos ==
Year	Song	Director
2006	"Rapture"	Cuppa Coffee Studios (CG)
2006	"Forever"	Little Red Robot (CG)
2008	"Ten Ton Brick"	Anthony Honn
2012	"How We End Up Alone"	Max Gutierrez

== Downloadable songs ==
Song	From	Album
"Falls Apart"	Live in Studio version of the original.	CONNECTSets
"Shallow"	Live in Studio version of the original.	CONNECTSets
"Rapture"	Live in Studio version of the original.	CONNECTSets
"Danse Russe"*	Live in Studio version of the original.	CONNECTSets

Notes

- Danse Russe from the CONNECTSets collection is also known as the “Danse Russe (Raw Mix) ”
- The CONNECTSets songs are part of a digital download from many of the online music stores such as Amazon. These songs were recorded in studio, and sound much like the versions that are performed at live shows. At a point, "Danse Russe," and "Falls Apart" were both put up for download on the band's Myspace.

== Myspace downloadable songs ==
Song	Type
"Rapture"	Studio Acoustic
"Falls Apart"	Studio Acoustic
"Danse Russe"	Studio Acoustic
"Unkind"	Radio Acoustic
"Better"	Studio Demo
"Yearn"	Album Version
"Talking To God"	Alternative Mix
"On The Radio"	Alternative Mix
"Danse Russe"	Studio Acoustic – WCCC
"Assurance"	Kilo Acoustic
"Talking To God"	Kilo Acoustic
"Alone With The Sea"	Kilo Acoustic
"Ten Ton Brick"	Kilo Acoustic
"Fighting Tao"	album, preview
"Wars"	album, preview

Notes

- All the songs here were placed for download on HURT's official Myspace page as downloadable tracks.

== Unreleased material ==
=== Live ===
- "Incomplete" - (Performed during a show in St. Louis, MO in 2008. Fan recordings only.)

=== In studio ===
- "Eat" - (Recorded to be on The Consumation album, but never released.)
- "Incomplete" - (Recorded to be on ”Self-Titled” album, but never released.)

=== Besides & Footnotes ===
In 2015, a "B Side" record of previously unreleased tracks re-recorded in the studio was announced on the band's official social media pages with a second disk with J Loren talking about the history of those songs.

Track Listing

1. Danse Russe Redux
2. Incomplete
3. House of Cards
4. Hospital Scene
5. Another Time
6. That (Such A Thing) (Jazzy Remix)
7. Trigger Happy Jesus
8. Rock 'N' Roll
9. Letter's From Nowhere
10. The Party
11. Danse Russe (Demo Ver)
12. Incomplete (Demo Ver)
13. Hospital Scene (Demo Ver)
14. Eat

== Cover songs ==
=== Live ===
- "Nothingman" - (Originally performed by Pearl Jam, played acoustically during a Huntsville, AL show, and again in studio at FM Talk 105.7)
- "Grind" - (Originally performed by Alice In Chains, performed at the Layne Staley Benefit Concert)
- "Nutshell" - (Originally performed by Alice In Chains, performed at the Layne Staley Benefit Concert)

=== Studio ===
- "Nothingman" -Originally performed by Pearl Jam
- "No Excuses" - Originally performed by Alice In Chains, this was a studio cover/collaboration with the band Smile Empty Soul.

== Other appearances ==
Song	Appearance	Year
"Rapture"	The A-Team (film) Trailer	2010
"Ten Ton Brick"	World’s Strongest Man - The Soundtrack	2007
"Rapture"	Criminal Minds commercial	2006
