= You by Me =

You By Me is a series of split albums featuring Tomas Kalnoky, best known as the lead singer of Streetlight Manifesto. The first release, Vol. 1, was released on November 16, 2010, through Kalnoky's Pentimento Music Company, with the second, Vol. 2, released on August 12, 2014.

== Vol. 1 - with Dan P. ==
You By Me: Vol. 1

Studio album (Split) by Toh Kay & Dan P.
- Released: November 16, 2010
- Genre: Folk; Acoustic; Ska
- Length: 36:23
- Label: Pentimento Music Company

You By Me series chronology
You By Me: Vol. 1 (2010)	You By Me: Vol. 2 (2014)

Toh Kay chronology
You By Me: Vol. 1 (2010)	Streetlight Lullabies (2011)

Dan Potthast chronology
Around the World (2010)	You By Me: Vol. 1 (2010)	My Living Room (2014)

You By Me: Vol. 1 is a split album featuring Toh Kay (Tomas Kalnoky, of Streetlight Manifesto) and Dan P. (Dan Potthast, of MU330). It was released on November 16, 2010, through Kalnoky's Pentimento Music Company.

The album features Kalnoky covering five songs written by Potthast (four being covers of Potthast's solo work, and one originally by MU330), and Potthast covering five Streetlight Manifesto songs, all written by Kalnoky. Some songs are radically reworked from their original versions, both lyrically and musically.

=== Track listing ===
Songs performed by Toh Kay, originally by Dan P.
No.	Title	Original version appears on	Length
1.	"I've Set Sail"	Eyeballs	2:57
2.	"Downtown"	Chumps on Parade (MU330)	3:25
3.	"I Went In"	Eyeballs	2:33
4.	"Tornado Joe"	Sweets and Meats	3:19
5.	"Got Through Another One"	Sweets and Meats	2:05

Songs performed by Dan P., originally by Streetlight Manifesto
No.	Title	Original version appears on	Length
6.	"A Moment of Silence"	Everything Goes Numb	4:19
7.	"Somewhere in the Between"	Somewhere in the Between	3:37
8.	"Watch It Crash"	Somewhere in the Between	4:48
9.	"We Will Fall Together"	Somewhere in the Between	4:34
10.	"The Big Sleep"	Everything Goes Numb	4:46

== Vol. 2 - with Sycamore Smith ==
You By Me: Vol. 2

Studio album (Split) by Toh Kay & Sycamore Smith
- Released: August 12, 2014
- Genre: Folk; Acoustic
- Label: Pentimento Music Company

You By Me series chronology
You By Me: Vol. 1 (2010)	You By Me: Vol. 2 (2014)

Toh Kay chronology
The Hand That Thieves (2013)	You By Me: Vol. 2 (2014)

Sycamore Smith chronology
Redux (2013)	You By Me: Vol. 2 (2014)

You By Me: Vol. 2 is a split album featuring Toh Kay and Sycamore Smith. It was released on August 12, 2014, by the Pentimento Music Company.

Like its predecessor, the album features Kalnoky covering three songs originally written and performed by Smith and Smith covering three Streetlight Manifesto songs, all written by Kalnoky.

=== Track listing ===
Songs performed by Toh Kay, originally by Sycamore Smith
No.	Title	Original version appears on	Length
1.	"Shantantitty Town"	The Wreck of the Muldoons (The Muldoons)
2.	"The Man with the Skeleton Arms"	Redux
3.	"Hokum All Ye Faithful"	Redux

Songs performed by Sycamore Smith, originally by Streetlight Manifesto
No.	Title	Original version appears on	Length
4.	"The Hand That Thieves"	The Hand That Thieves
5.	"Would You Be Impressed?"	Somewhere in the Between
6.	"A Better Place, A Better Time"	Everything Goes Numb

== See also ==
- 99 Songs of Revolution
- MU330
- Streetlight Manifesto
