= Streetlight Lullabies =

Studio album by Toh Kay
- Released: November 22, 2011
- Genre: Folk, acoustic
- Length: 43:02
- Label: Pentimento Music Company

Toh Kay chronology
You By Me: Vol. 1 (2010)	Streetlight Lullabies (2011)	The Hand That Thieves (2013)

Professional ratings
Review scores
Source	Rating
Punknews.org	3.5/5 stars
Sputnikmusic	3.5/5

Streetlight Lullabies is a full-length studio album by Toh Kay (Tomas Kalnoky, of Streetlight Manifesto), released November 22, 2011. The album features 10 acoustic solo versions of Streetlight Manifesto songs.

The album's cover art previously appeared on the back cover of the booklet for Everything Goes Numb.

== Track listing ==
No.	Title	Original version appears on	Length
1.	"Watch It Crash"	Somewhere in the Between	3:38
2.	"Somewhere in the Between"	Somewhere in the Between	3:15
3.	"Forty Days"	Somewhere in the Between	3:20
4.	"We Will Fall Together"	Somewhere in the Between	6:46
5.	"Dear Sergio"	Keasbey Nights	4:06
6.	"Would You Be Impressed?"	Somewhere in the Between	3:03
7.	"Sick and Sad"	Keasbey Nights	3:13
8.	"A Moment of Silence"	Everything Goes Numb	4:22
9.	"The Big Sleep"	Everything Goes Numb	5:13
10.	"A Better Place, A Better Time"	Everything Goes Numb	6:06

== Reception ==
The album has received positive reviews, with many critics commenting positively on Kalnoky's skill as a guitarist and ability to keep the songs interesting despite the simplicity of the instrumentation. Negative comments usually focused on the derivative and unoriginal nature of the album (with all the material on the album being songs previously recorded by Streetlight Manifesto).

== See also ==
- You By Me: Vol. 1
- Streetlight Manifesto
