= The Hands That Thieve =

2013 album by Streetlight Manifesto

Studio album by Streetlight Manifesto
- Released: April 30, 2013
- Recorded: 2012–2013
- Genres: Ska punk, punk rock
- Length: 50:04
- Labels: Pentimento, Victory

Streetlight Manifesto chronology
99 Songs of Revolution: Vol. 1 (2010)	The Hands That Thieve (2013)	The Place Behind the Stars (TBA)

Singles from The Hands That Thieve
- 1. "The Three of Us" Released: April 2, 2013

The Hands That Thieve is the fifth studio album by the American ska-punk band Streetlight Manifesto. It was their first studio album since 2010's 99 Songs of Revolution: Vol. 1, and their first album of original material since 2007's Somewhere in the Between. Along with the Streetlight album, an acoustic version of the album (titled The Hand That Thieves) was intended to be released by Toh Kay, but was cancelled. The album was originally set to be released in the summer of 2012, but was pushed back several times due to label problems and rewrites, to its eventual release date of April 30, 2013. The album has received generally favorable critical reception.

Professional ratings
Aggregate scores
Source	Rating
Metacritic	77/100
Review scores
Source	Rating
Allmusic	3.5/5 stars
Punknews.org	4.5/5 stars
Popmatters	7/10
Alternative Press	4/5 stars
Sputnikmusic	4.2/5

== Release ==
The band completed the album in mid-January, and it was announced on February 15 that the album would be finally released on April 30. The band also planned to produce a live EP to compensate for the various delays, which they claimed would be "an exclusive RISC Store gift and...the only professional live Streetlight Manifesto recording to date." On April 1, the band released the first full song from the album "The Three of Us". On April 19, the album was leaked on many sites. On April 30, the album was released as planned, but due to conflicts with Victory Records, the band was prevented from releasing the album and fulfilling preorders from their own website. There were also claims that the live EP was cancelled due to legal issues.

In May 2014, fans who originally preordered the album through the RISC Store received a "mystery gift" instead of the actual album, due to Victory Records not releasing any physical copies to the band. Fans received a white Digipak with a photograph of an orange tabby cat on its front cover and booklet cover, with no text or identifiers other than the track listing on the back cover. The booklet contains the lyrics to all ten songs, photographs of the band, and Aesop's Fable The Dog and the Wolf on its final page. The Digipak contained a blank CD-R that had artwork of a barren tree, with the band commenting on their Facebook page:

"You can use the blank cd to store your digital files, as a coaster, or even to burn your favorite songs. Any songs you want to put on it, you can put on it. You can put any amount of songs on it, as long as that amount will fit on a standard CD-R. You can burn 2 songs, 30 songs or even 10 songs, it's up to you. You can find music to burn onto the cd on the internet, or even ask fellow fans of bands you like to share their favorite songs so you can burn them, as long as you do so legally, or whatever. Then when you're done burning the cd (it takes a few minutes, but it's really quite simple to do), you can put the cd on your shelf, in your car, wherever. There are no words on the cd (besides the poems), no bar codes, no logos, no mean-hearted little dogs, nothing. It's just a blank cd that we're providing for you, along with a booklet of poetry and photography."

== Track listing ==
All tracks are written by Tomas Kalnoky.

No.	Title	Length
1.	"The Three of Us"	5:18
2.	"Ungrateful"	4:31
3.	"The Littlest Things"	4:50
4.	"The Hands That Thieve"	5:40
5.	"With Any Sort of Certainty"	6:10
6.	"If Only for Memories"	5:28
7.	"They Broke Him Down"	5:20
8.	"Toe to Toe"	4:22
9.	"Oh Me, Oh My"	3:45
10.	"Your Day Will Come"	4:44
Total length:		50:04

== Personnel ==
=== Streetlight Manifesto ===
- Mike Brown – alto saxophone, baritone saxophone, backing vocals
- Jim Conti – alto saxophone, tenor saxophone, backing vocals
- Tomas Kalnoky – vocals, guitar, songwriting, photography
- Pete McCullough – double bass, bass guitar, backing vocals
- Nadav Nirenberg – trombone, backing vocals
- Matt Stewart – trumpet, backing vocals
- Chris Thatcher – drums

=== Additional personnel ===
- Mac Miller – gang vocals
- Reade Wolcott – gang vocals
- Brendt Rioux – gang vocals
- Kevin Silva – gang vocals
- Kasey Clark – gang vocals
- Matt Medina – gang vocals
- Kyle Clark – gang vocals
- Peggy Burrows – gang vocals
- Demian Arriaga – percussion
- Phred Brown – keys
- James Whitten – recording engineer
- Matt Messenger – mixing
- Alan Douches – mastering

== Charts ==
Chart performance
Chart (2013)	Peak position
UK Rock & Metal Albums (Official Charts)	21
US Billboard 200	95
US Independent Albums (Billboard)	21
US Top Alternative Albums (Billboard)	19
US Top Rock Albums (Billboard)	26

== Toh Kay version ==
The Hand That Thieves

Studio album by Toh Kay
- Released: April 30, 2013
- Recorded: 2012-2013
- Genres: Folk, acoustic
- Length: 53:00
- Label: Pentimento

Toh Kay chronology
Streetlight Lullabies (2011)	The Hand That Thieves (2013)	You By Me: Vol. 2 (2014)

In addition to the Streetlight Manifesto album, an acoustic version of the album titled The Hand That Thieves was planned to be released by Toh Kay and his acoustic trio. Tomas Kalnoky stated, "The albums may have the same song titles, lyrics and chord progressions, but the similarities end there. The album has a laid back, late night, lazy feel - something to put your feet up to, when you're not quite in the mood for the ball of frenetic energy that is Streetlight Manifesto." This album, along with the Streetlight version, was pushed back due to rewrites and label issues, and was planned to be released on April 30, 2013. On April 15, Tomas released his first full song from the album "With Any Sort Of Certainty" along with a music video animated by Scott Benson. However, the video has since been taken down by Victory Records. On April 21, 2013, according to Kalnoky's Twitter account, Victory records successfully had the Toh Kay version of the album removed from Amazon. On April 30, Kalnoky announced that the Toh Kay version of the album would not be released in the foreseeable future due to legal problems with Victory Records. According to the band's website, Victory Records had given Streetlight the choice between pulling the Toh Kay record completely or releasing it through Victory Records. The band and Kalnoky, who have shared a notoriously turbulent relationship with the record label, decided to cancel the record. Although the album was cancelled, it was leaked on its expected release day. CDs including the album and Toh Kay's music video of "With Any Sort Of Certainty" appeared during "The End of the Beginning" tour. The CD's metadata lists the title of the disc as "Fuck Victory" and a "FuckVictory.txt" file is included on the disc, with a message from "the Punk Rock Pirate". However, after their legal troubles were settled with Victory Records, the band announced their plan to release the album under Tomas' own Pentimento Music Company, though this has not happened as of 2026.

=== Track listing ===
No.	Title	Length
1.	"The Three of Us"	4:55
2.	"Ungrateful"	6:04
3.	"The Littlest Things"	4:52
4.	"The Hands That Thieve"	4:54
5.	"With Any Sort of Certainty"	6:56
6.	"If Only for Memories"	5:44
7.	"They Broke Him Down"	5:20
8.	"Toe to Toe"	4:21
9.	"Oh Me, Oh My"	4:10
10.	"Your Day Will Come"	5:44
Total length:		53:00
