= A Call to Arms (EP) =

EP by Bandits of the Acoustic Revolution
- Released: 21 December 2001
- Genre: Acoustic, folk, alternative rock
- Length: 18:19
- Label: The R.I.S.C. Group; Pentimento Music Company

A Call to Arms is the 2001 debut EP by Bandits of the Acoustic Revolution, a musical collective headed by Tomas Kalnoky (of Streetlight Manifesto and early Catch 22). It was released by The R.I.S.C. Group in 2001 to little fanfare but has been positively reviewed retrospectively. "Dear Sergio" is a cover of the first song on Catch 22's debut album Keasbey Nights, while the tracks "Here's to Life" and "They Provide the Paint for the Picture-Perfect Masterpiece That You Will Paint on the Insides of Your Eyelids" would later appear with new versions on the Streetlight Manifesto albums Everything Goes Numb and 99 Songs of Revolution: Vol. 1, respectively.

== Reception ==
A Call to Arms did not receive many reviews at the time of its initial release but has been positively reviewed in the wake of Kalnoky's other band Streelight Manifesto's popularity. In a 2003 review, Brian Shultz of Punknews.org called the EP "a fun, laid-back approach to the horn-indulged genre which proves there are still bands that couldn't care less what the flavor of the week is." Substream Magazine referred to it as a "cult favorite" in the ska scene. Terry Eagan of Ink 19 described A Call to Arms as "Eclectic and high energy, with enough attitude to sway even the most cynical observer." BrooklynVegan's Gordon Phillips said that the EP "showcased instrumentation beyond typical third-wave [ska] fare".

Professional ratings
Review scores
| Source | Rating |
|---|---|
| Punknews.org | 3.5/5 stars |

== Track listing ==
| No. | Title | Length |
|---|---|---|
| 1. | "Intro: This is a Call to Arms" | 1:22 |
| 2. | "Here's to Life" | 5:18 |
| 3. | "Dear Sergio" | 3:04 |
| 4. | "It's a Wonderful Life" | 4:56 |
| 5. | "They Provide the Paint for the Picture-Perfect Masterpiece That You Will Paint on the Insides of Your Eyelids" | 3:39 |
| Total length: | | 18:19 |

== Personnel ==
- Tomas Kalnoky - guitar, vocals, songwriting, artwork
- Jamie Egan - trombone
- Nick Afflitto - trumpet
- Marcy Ciuffreda - cello
- Rachel Goldstein - viola, vocals
- Matt Dannenberg - vocals
- Layton Hayes - piano
- John Paul Jones - trumpet
- Achilles Kalnoky - violin
- Paul Lowndes - drums
- Chris Paszik - double bass
- Mark Rendeiro - horn
- Dan Ross - baritone saxophone, alto saxophone
- Pete Sibilia - tenor saxophone
- Shane Thompson - congas, timbales
- Natalia Ushak - vocals
- Dan Potthast - guitar

=== Additional personnel ===
- Josh Ansley - gang vocals
- Greg Davidson - gang vocals
- Jeff Davidson - gang vocals
- Rebecca Mozo - gang vocals
- Dave Piava - gang vocals
- Mike Struening - gang vocals
- John Noll - mastering
