= This Is Why We Can't Have Nice Things =

This Is Why We Can't Have Nice Things may refer to:

== Literature ==
- This Is Why We Can't Have Nice Things, a 2015 book by Whitney Phillips
- This Is Why We Can't Have Nice Things, a 2024 short-story collection by Naomi Wood

== Music ==
=== Albums ===
- This Is Why We Can't Have Nice Things, by Alter Der Ruine, 2010
- This Is Why We Can't Have Nice Things, by Barleyjuice, 2013
- This Is Why We Can't Have Nice Things, by Get Set Go, 2017
- This Is Why We Can't Have Nice Things, by the Stanford Band, 2003

=== Songs ===
- "This Is Why We Can't Have Nice Things", by the Blackout from The Best in Town, 2009
- "This Is Why We Can't Have Nice Things", by Olympia from Self Talk, 2016
- "This Is Why We Can't Have Nice Things", by Taylor Swift from Reputation, 2017

== Other uses ==
- This Is Why We Can't Have Nice Things, a 2011 collection of photographs by David Carol
- This is why we can't have nice things..., a 2011 art exhibition by Luke Cornish

== See also ==
- This Is Why We Don't Have Nice Things, an album by Rodeo Ruby Love
- This Is Why We Don't Have Nice Things, an EP by Every Avenue
