= Ten Ton Brick =

Single by Hurt

from the album Vol. II
- Released: June 26, 2007
- Recorded: March 2007
- Genre: Nu metal
- Length: 3:50
- Label: Capitol
- Songwriters: J. Loren Wince, Paul Spatola, Josh Ansley
- Producer: Eric Greedy

Hurt singles chronology
"Falls Apart" (2006)	"Ten Ton Brick" (2007)	"Loded" (2008)

"Ten Ton Brick" is a song by American rock band Hurt. The song was released as the lead single from the band's fourth studio album Vol. II. "Ten Ton Brick" is arguably Hurt's most well known song, peaking at no. 6 on the Billboard Mainstream Rock chart.

== Music video ==
The song's music video was directed by Anthony Honn.

== Reception ==
On May 12, 2009, Hurt received an award for the song during SESAC’s 13th annual New York Music Awards.

== Track listing ==
No.	Title	Length
1.	"Ten Ton Brick" (explicit version)	3:50
2.	"Ten Ton Brick" (clean version)	3:50

== Chart positions ==
Chart (2007)	Peak position
US Alternative Songs	28
US Mainstream Rock	6
