= The Place Behind the Stars =

2026 studio album by Streetlight Manifesto

Studio album by Streetlight Manifesto
- Released: TBA
- Recorded: 2019–2026
- Genres: Ska punk, punk rock
- Label: Pentimento
- Producer: Tomas Kalnoky

Streetlight Manifesto chronology
The Hands That Thieve (2013)	The Place Behind the Stars (TBA)

Singles from The Place Behind the Stars
- 1. "Enormous" Released: June 24, 2025; 2. "Everything to Everyone" Released: June 24, 2025; 3. "Imagine This" Released: June 24, 2025

The Place Behind the Stars is the upcoming sixth studio album by American ska-punk band Streetlight Manifesto. The album is set to be released in two parts; the first six songs were released on June 22, 2026 as an EP and the remaining songs and complete album are set to be released through Pentimento Music Company. The album is preceded by three singles released on June 24, 2025, "Imagine This", "Everything to Everyone", and "Enormous".

== Background ==
Halfway to the Place Behind the Stars

EP by Streetlight Manifesto
- Released: June 22, 2026
- Recorded: 2019–2026
- Genres: Ska punk, punk rock
- Length: 34:48
- Label: Pentimento

A new Streetlight Manifesto album was first hinted at in April 2024, with lead singer and guitarist Tomas Kalnoky stating the band had begun working on the album in 2019 and the album was "85% complete." In April 2025, Streetlight Manifesto posted a teaser trailer for the new album. Days later they revealed the title of the album and gave a release date, June 24, 2025, through their own label, Pentimento Music Company. When the original release date for the album came, the band instead released three singles, "Enormous", "Everything to Everyone", and "Imagine This", all with the subtitle "(20250624) Mix" exclusively on their YouTube channel. The release date of the album was then pushed to the fall of 2025. By fall, Kalnoky released a social media post apologizing and subsequently delaying the album's release indefinitely. The band continued to tour throughout the delays. On June 19, 2026, Kalnoky made another post to the band's Instagram page, apologizing for the continued delays and announcing the new album release date of September 2026, along with the release of five songs (including the three previously released) from the album to streaming services the following week. On June 22, the band released the EP Halfway to the Place Behind the Stars containing the new songs "Oooo", "All the Pieces", and "How Do You Sleep at Night?" (one track more than originally promised) along with new mixes for the previously released singles, with each track subtitled as the "Halfway Version". On September 11, 2026, Kalnoky announced on the band's Instagram that the album would again be delayed, this time giving no speculated release date.

== Reception ==
The Verge journalist David Imel called the Halfway to the Place Behind the Stars EP a "blessing" from the band and listed it as one of his favorite recent releases.

== Track listing ==
All tracks are written by Tomas Kalnoky.

Halfway to the Place Behind the Stars track listing
No.	Title	Length
1.	"Oooo"	1:35
2.	"Enormous"	7:18
3.	"Everything to Everyone"	6:30
4.	"All the Pieces"	8:03
5.	"Imagine This"	6:08
6.	"How Do You Sleep at Night?"	5:13

== Personnel ==
=== Streetlight Manifesto ===
- Tomas Kalnoky – lead vocals, guitar
- Matt Stewart (Note: Stewart recorded his parts prior to his death in 2023.) – trumpet
- Joshua Gawel – trumpet
- Karl Lyden – trombone
- Jim Conti – tenor saxophone
- Dan Ross – alto saxophone
- Mike Brown – baritone saxophone
- Pete McCullough – bass guitar
- Chris Thatcher – drum kit

=== Production ===
- Tomas Kalnoky – producer
