= Loded =

Single by Hurt

from the album Vol. II
- Released: April 15, 2008
- Recorded: March 2007
- Genre: Nu metal; post-grunge
- Length: 3:13
- Label: Capitol
- Songwriter(s): J. Loren Wince
- Producer(s): Eric Greedy

Hurt singles chronology
"Ten Ton Brick" (2007)	"Loded" (2008)	"Wars" (2008)

"Loded" is a song by American rock band Hurt. The song was released as the second and final single from the band's album Vol. II. The song failed to reach the same success as previous single "Ten Ton Brick," only peaking at no. 33 on the Mainstream Rock Songs chart. "Loded" is the last single by the band to be released through Capitol Records.

== Background ==
"Loded" originally appeared on the band's second studio album The Consumation, which was released in 2003. The song was re-recorded in 2007 for the album Vol. II. The song was released as a single following a poll on the band's forum.

== Track listing ==
No.	Title	Length
1.	"Loded" (Vol. II version)	3:13
2.	"Loded" (The Consumation version)	3:31

== Chart positions ==
Chart (2008)	Peak position
US Main.	33

== Personnel ==
- J. Loren Wince – vocals, guitar
- Paul Spatola – guitar
- Josh Ansley – bass
- Evan Johns – drums
