= Vol. 1 (Hurt album) =

Vol.1

Studio album by HURT
- Released: March 21, 2006
- Studio: Sound City Studios, Van Nuys, CA; Hammersound, Chatsworth, CA
- Genre: Avant-garde metal, post-grunge, nu metal, progressive rock, emo
- Length: 56:53
- Label: Capitol
- Producer: Eric Greedy; Jane Lewis

HURT chronology
The Consumation (2003)	Vol.1 (2006)	Vol. II (2007)

Singles from Vol. 1
- 1. "Rapture" Released: April 25, 2006; 2. "Falls Apart" Released: August 1, 2006

Professional ratings
Review scores
Source	Rating
Allmusic	3/5 stars

Vol. 1 is the third official album, but first major label release, by the rock band HURT, released on March 21, 2006. This album contains many tracks that are very dark in nature. The album has themes such as twisted logic from over-obsession with religion in "Rapture"; pain from love in both "Falls Apart" and "Unkind"; and drug addiction in "Overdose".

This album was released with two different packages. One was the standard jewel case, and the other a cardboard folding case, featuring a few more pieces of artwork inside, and a red bookmark attached to the case. Both pressings, however, contain exactly the same song material.

"House Carpenter" ends at 6:45, and the track continues with a rainstorm sound effect until 8:29, when an apparent hidden track begins. The hidden track is a guitar and several strings playing over the rainstorm, and continues for 1:04. The rainstorm is also heard at the beginning of this band's fourth full-length release, Vol. II. The song ends with the voice of a woman saying "I love you so much". The phrase is also heard in the background of "Unkind" at 1:24.

At one time, there was rumor of an 11-minute version of the song "Rapture". J. Loren's personal agenda was to have "Rapture" be their first single; this 11-minute version was destroyed, and has been stated to never be heard again.

Two videos have spawned from this album; one for their single, "Rapture", and one for the song "Forever".

Two songs from this album were released on previous albums. "Cold Inside" originally appeared on The Consumation, and "Unkind" had been drastically changed from the older version on their self-titled album.

Four songs from this album have been released as alternate mixes, known as the CONNECTSets. The songs "Falls Apart", "Shallow", "Rapture", and "Danse Russe" were a part of this set, and are all very similar to the versions that are played during live concerts. The album has sold nearly 150,000 copies since its release.

The song "Rapture" was used in the trailer for the film adaptation of The A-Team, and "Unkind" featured in the videogame NHL 07

== Track listing ==
All tracks are written by J. Loren Wince.

No.	Title	Length
1.	"Shallow"	3:50
2.	"Rapture"	5:40
3.	"Overdose"	6:37
4.	"Falls Apart"	4:41
5.	"Forever"	3:34
6.	"Losing"	5:08
7.	"Unkind"	4:07
8.	"Danse Russe"	3:53
9.	"Dirty"	5:27
10.	"Cold Inside"	4:21
11.	"House Carpenter"	9:33

== Chart positions ==
Information taken from this source.

Album

Chart (2006)	Peak position
The Billboard 200	175
Top Heatseekers (Billboard)	7

Singles

Year	Song	Chart positions
Year	Song	US Mainstream Rock
2006	"Rapture"	17
2006	"Falls Apart"	16

== Personnel ==
Personnel information from album liner notes

- J. Loren Wince - vocals, guitar, violin
- Evan Johns - drums, percussion, piano
- Josh Ansley - bass, backing vocals
- Paul Spatola - guitar, backing vocals

=== Additional personnel ===
- Jane Lewis - executive producer
- Eric Greedy - producer, engineering
- Mick Guzauski - mixing
- Tom Bender - mixing
- Brian Gardner - mastering
- Pete Martinez - additional engineering
- Brian Winshell - additional engineering
- Justin Meldal-Johnsen - bass
- Ted Taylor - art director
