= WMTU-FM =

Radio station in Houghton, Michigan, US

- Houghton, Michigan; United States
- Broadcast area
- Frequency: 91.9 MHz
- Branding: WMTU Radio

Programming
- Format: Variety; college; student station

Ownership
- Owner: Michigan Technological University

History
- First air date: 1994
- Call sign meaning: Michigan Technological University

Technical information
- Licensing authority: FCC
- Facility ID: 41685
- Class: C3
- ERP: 100 watts
- Transmitter coordinates: 47°07′10.4″N 88°32′58.4″W

Links
- Public license information: Public file; LMS
- Website: wmtu.fm

WMTU-FM 91.9 is a campus radio station run by the students at Michigan Technological University. It is found in the basement of Wadsworth Hall, broadcasts 24 hours a day, 7 days a week, and is operated by a volunteer air staff, general staff, department heads, and a general manager.

== History ==
The station's precursor, WVRW (Voice of Radio, Wadsworth), began broadcasting in 1956, as a carrier current AM station. It changed its callsign to WRS (Wadsworth Radio Service) two years later, to show that it now served all dormitories on campus. The current callsign "WMTU" was adopted in 1975. Two years after that change, WMTU began broadcasting as a cable FM station via the local cable television system. A 24-hour format, with three-hour shows, was adopted two years later in 1979.

In 1993, WMTU received an FM broadcasting license from the Federal Communications Commission (FCC). The following year, the station began over-the-air broadcasting from atop the Mechanical Engineering and Engineering Mechanics building on the Michigan Tech campus with an effective radiated power of 100 watts. In 1998, WMTU began broadcasting via RealAudio, utilizing a Helix server located in the basement of Michigan Tech's Electrical Engineering Resources Center (EERC).

In 2004, renovations to Wadsworth Hall resulted in a move from the original location next to the Tri-Hall Weight Club to a temporary location near the Campus Cafe. In 2005, the FCC approved a request for WMTU to move its transmitter to a university-owned tower atop Arcadia Hill. This allowed the station to upgrade its power from 100 watts to 4400 watts effective radiated power, providing coverage to campus as well as many surrounding communities. Later that year, the station returned to its original location in the basement of Wadsworth hall, now sporting a new "storefront" look to its DJ booth along with nearly triple the music storage space. Renovations also resulted in a "commons" area outside of the station, used for small concerts and other activities, as well as a room which the WMTU staff uses for weekly meetings.

In 2009, WMTU changed its daily schedule to 12 shows in two-hour blocks. In 2012, the station remodeled its DJ booth with new equipment and a new look, and began a continuous, partially automated, 24-hour broadcast.

== Station programming ==
All programming decisions are made by the Program Director and the Broadcast Supervisor, both positions elected yearly by WMTU's General Staff. All DJs are unpaid volunteers and are able to play anything that they would like to during their show provided that the material complies with the rules of Michigan Technological University and the FCC.

WMTU DJs largely have a two-hour time slot; with some opting for shorter and longer times as permitted by the current head of broadcasting.

== Concerts ==
Keweenawesomefest, established in 2007, is a two-day festival sponsored by WMTU presenting a number of musicians from throughout the state of Michigan. Past performers have included Frontier Ruckus, Low, Chris Bathgate, Beep Beep, Deastro, Canada, Fred Thomas, SAH, Matt Jones, Misty Lyn, the Mahonies, Annie Palmer, Terrible Twos, Santa and Rudolph, Charlie Slick, the Betamales, Sycamore Smith, the Mighty Narwhale, Anarkinda, This is Deer Country, The Photographers, Cotton Jones, Drink Up Buttercup, The Daredevil Christopher Wright, Bear Claw, John the Savage, Honda Civic, Millions of Brazilians, and Electric Six.

Other local, regional, and national touring acts WMTU has presented live in concert include Black Eyed Snakes, The French Irish Coalition, Wesley Willis, Small Brown Bike, the Gunshy, Starlight Drifters, Poster Children, MC Juice, Heiruspecs, Great Lakes Myth Society, Chris Bathgate, Jerry Fels, Sycamore Smith, Third Coast, Deadly Waters, Pseudocell, Avert, The Blackflies, Dirty Americans, Paper Street Saints, Quixote, the Blend, the Crest, Modill, The Show Is the Rainbow, the Mae Shi, the Mercury Program, Squirtgun, Das Sücktet, Athletic Mic League, Honda Civic, Calumet-Hecla, the National Bummer, Breathe Smoke, Kristin Forbes, the Saurus, Atombombpocketknife, Kid Brother Collective, Chiodos, Kinetic Stereo Kids, Soma 220, Liquid Sun, Erik Koskinen, Switch, Tall Drink of Water, Milton, Minus, Hell Town Trio, Fried Chinese Donalds, Old Victoria, Nobody Likes a Tricycle, VSEPR, Mustard Plug, Djiaant, Tom Berringer and the Pisst-Off Androids.

== See also ==
- Campus radio
- List of college radio stations in the United States
