= Keasbey Nights =

1998 album by Catch 22

Studio album by Catch 22
- Released: March 24, 1998
- Recorded: 1997
- Genre: Ska punk
- Length: 46:13
- Label: Victory
- Producer: Hillary Johnson, James Egan

Catch 22 chronology
Rules of the Game (1996)	Keasbey Nights (1998)	Washed Up! (1999)

Catch 22 studio chronology
Keasbey Nights (1998)	Alone in a Crowd (2000)

Keasbey Nights is the debut album by the American ska punk band Catch 22, released on March 24, 1998, by Victory Records. It is the only album by the band's original lineup, as singer/songwriter/guitarist Tomas Kalnoky, bassist Josh Ansley, and horn player James Egan all left the group later that year. Kalnoky re-recorded the entire album in 2006 with his new band Streetlight Manifesto in response to Victory's plan to re-release it. The album's title references Keasbey, New Jersey, an unincorporated area within the Woodbridge Township of Middlesex County.

== Track listing ==
All songs written by Tomas Kalnoky

1. "Dear Sergio" – 2:31
2. "Sick and Sad" – 2:21
3. "Keasbey Nights" – 3:02
4. "Day In, Day Out" – 3:22
5. "Walking Away" – 4:06
6. "Giving Up, Giving In" – 2:48
7. "On & On & On" – 3:14
8. "Riding the Fourth Wave" – 1:50
9. "This One Goes Out To…" – 2:35
10. "Supernothing" – 2:49
11. "9mm and a Three Piece Suit" – 1:56
12. "Kristina She Don't Know I Exist" – 5:10
13. "As the Footsteps Die Out Forever" – 3:11
14. "1234, 1234" – 7:09

Five of the tracks were previously included in Rules of the Game, the band's previous recording.

== Personnel ==
- Tomas Kalnoky - concept, guitars, music, photography, lead vocals, lyrics
- Josh Ansley - bass guitar, backing vocals
- Sean Bonner - construction
- Alan Douches - mastering
- Jamie Egan - co-production, trombone, flute, French horn, tin whistle, backing vocals
- Ryan Eldred - saxophone, backing vocals
- Grace Falconer - assistant Engineer
- Chris Greer - drum kit
- Kevin Gunther - trumpet, backing vocals
- Hillary Johnson - co-production, mixing, recording
- Augusto F. Menezes - photography

== Streetlight Manifesto version ==
Keasbey Nights

Studio album by Streetlight Manifesto
- Released: March 7, 2006
- Recorded: 2004, June–September 2005
- Genre: Ska punk
- Length: 46:57
- Label: Victory

Streetlight Manifesto chronology
Everything Goes Numb (2003)	Keasbey Nights (2006)	Somewhere in the Between (2007)

In 2004, Kalnoky decided to re-record Keasbey Nights with his new band Streetlight Manifesto. The decision was prompted by Victory Records' plan to re-release the album with additional content. The Streetlight Manifesto version was originally scheduled to be released in late 2004, but was continually delayed until being released on March 7, 2006.

The re-recorded version includes several musical and lyrical changes from the original. "Dear Sergio" includes an extra verse that Kalnoky had added when he recorded the song with the Bandits of the Acoustic Revolution on A Call to Arms (2001). Day In, Day Out features a new verse in place of playing the first verse again. The muted trumpet solo in "This One Goes Out To..." was replaced with a tenor saxophone, and different instruments were also used during the solo section of "Kristina She Don't Know I Exist". In "As the Footsteps Die out Forever", the line "I got a lot to do, I got a lot to be" is replaced with "You've got a lot to do, you've got a lot to be". Most notably, Kalnoky replaced the shout-outs during the extended ending of "1234, 1234" with a text-to-speech transcription of an interview in which he explains his motivations for re-recording the album:

"We wanted to get it right for once. Plus it helps me sleep at night knowing blood, sweat, and tears were put into a record as opposed to making people pay thirteen bucks for a record and they only get flashy new cover art. This release is a preemptive strike, I guess. Whatever you want to call it, it'll piss people off, and that, at the end of the day, is all that really matters.

If there's one thing I can't stand it's when a CD is re-released untouched sonically, with a new cover and maybe a live video, and kids are duped into buying this new edition of something they already have. I was upset when I was told the guys were going to do this for Keasbey, so I offered to re-record it because I've always thought it sounded like pure garbage sound-wise. Plus the budgets we get are laughable, particularly for a band with seven musicians to record. So we used some of our own money and took our time with this one. I'll tell you right now, we have no intent on hiding our intentions. We wanted to prevent the re-release of Keasbey untouched as well as get the record to sound how it should have sounded originally. For that we sacrificed months of our time and our money, and now we feel what we have is worth paying for. Although, truth be told, I don't care if a single record is sold, as it is indeed old music, and kids have a right to know what it is and to decide whether or not they'll pay for it. Do I think it's worth thirteen dollars? Yes, very much so, but that's my opinion. What other people decide, that's their own opinion. We're going to keep doing what we do whether or not a single record is sold."

The liner notes for the album include a message: "There is absolutely no way of explaining the existence of the record you now hold in your hands without somehow offending, infuriating, confusing or alienating certain parties, so we won't even try. Please enjoy this for what it is."

=== Personnel ===
- Jim Conti - tenor saxophone
- Jamie Egan - trumpet, backing vocals
- Tomas Kalnoky - guitar, mixing, music, recording, lead vocals, lyrics
- Chris Paszik - bass guitar, backing vocals
- Dan Ross - alto saxophone, baritone saxophone
- Mike Soprano - trombone
- Chris Thatcher - drum kit
- Colin Bell, Kenny Holland, Christopher Knowles, and Jeff Smith - gang vocals
- Jay Franco - mastering
- Rob Thatcher - hand percussion, gang vocals

== Reception of both albums ==
Professional ratings
Review scores
Source	Rating
Allmusic	4/5 stars

Allmusic's Corey Apar rated both versions of Keasbey Nights four out of five stars. Of the original version, she stated that "ska revival fans of the late '90s will recognize the title immediately". Of the newer version, she explained that the tone "comes off a bit smoother and lacking some of the raw, youthful energy that made the original album such a cult classic." Putting both albums into perspective, she also stated: "Lacking the energy or desire to pick both albums apart and compare song by song, [the listener] shall instead be left with these thoughts."
