= Vol. II (Hurt album) =

Studio album by Hurt
- Released: September 25, 2007
- Recorded: March 2007
- Genres: Nu metal, alternative metal, post-grunge
- Length: 58:04
- Label: Capitol
- Producer: Eric Greedy

Hurt chronology
Vol. I (2006)	Vol. II (2007)	Goodbye to the Machine (2009)

Singles from Vol. II
- 1. "Ten Ton Brick" Released: June 26, 2007; 2. "Loded" Released: April 15, 2008

Vol. II is the fourth full-length studio album by the rock band Hurt, and was released on September 25, 2007.

== Sound and musical style ==
This album shares many of the sorrowful and painful themes as Vol. I. However, many songs on this album have slower tempos and more acoustic instrumentation, while still maintaining a hard rock sound. Another change from Vol. I is the inclusion of different instruments, such as the banjo and dobro, and a lineup of female backup singers.

== Background ==
Before having Eric Greedy mix the album, the band had sent it to a mixing engineer who did not mix the album to the band's satisfaction. J. Loren said of the situation, "...he was a very notable person that we paid a large sum of money to, and he destroyed the record. It sounded so horrible, I actually had a nervous breakdown when I heard the record, and they threw me in a van before the cops came. So, I thought that my life was over, I just literally could not handle the devastation of it."

Many of the songs on this album are rerecorded from previous works. The songs "Summers Lost," "Abuse of SID," and "Better" are originally from Hurt's self-titled album. "Alone With the Sea," "Loded," and "Et Al" are originally from The Consumation.

"Loded," the second single from this album, was chosen by a poll taken on the band's forum.

The band also released alternate mixes to the songs "Talking to God" and "On the Radio" through their MySpace.

== Track listing ==
All tracks are written by J. Loren Wince, except where noted.

No.	Title	Writer(s)	Length
1.	"Summers Lost"		6:10
2.	"Ten Ton Brick"	L. Wince, P. Spatola, J. Ansley	3:50
3.	"Aftermath"	L. Wince, P. Spatola	3:13
4.	"Abuse of SID"		4:50
5.	"Alone With the Sea"		5:22
6.	"Talking to God"		4:53
7.	"Loded"		3:13
8.	"Better"		4:27
9.	"Assurance"		4:34
10.	"On the Radio"		5:10
11.	"Et Al"		5:22
12.	"Thank You for Listening"		6:55

== Personnel ==
Personnel information from album liner notes.

- J. Loren Wince - vocals, guitar, violin, banjo, string arrangement
- Paul Spatola - guitar, dobro, piano
- Josh Ansley - bass
- Evan Johns - drums

=== Additional personnel ===
- Eric Greedy - producer, engineering, mixing
- Leon Zervos - mastering
- Lenny Castro - percussion
- Valerie Carter - additional vocal support
- Machan Taylor - additional vocal support
- Elaine Caswell - additional vocal support
- Eyvonne Williams-Hines - additional vocal support
- Lynn Fiddmont - additional vocal support
- Novi Novog - string arrangement
- Dave Klotz - string arrangement, programming
- Larry Tuttle - string arrangement
- Brian Winshell - programming
- Jason Benham - additional engineering
- Cecil Gregory - additional engineering
- Tom Gloady - additional engineering
- Ted Taylor - art director, photography

== Reception ==
Professional ratings
Review scores
Source	Rating
AbsolutePunk	(94%)
Allmusic	4.5/5 stars

The album was praised by both fans and critics. It did exceptionally well in many professional reviews. It has sold nearly 50,000 copies since its release.

On May 12, 2009, Hurt received an award for the song "Ten Ton Brick" during SESAC’s 13th annual New York Music Awards.

== Charts ==
Chart (2007)	Peak position
US Billboard 200	101
US Top Heatseekers	1

=== Singles ===
Year	Title	Peak chart position	
Year	Title	US Mainstream Rock	US Modern Rock
2007	"Ten Ton Brick"	6	28
2008	"Loded"	33	—
