= Rodeo Ruby Love =

- Origin: Marion, Indiana, United States
- Genres: Pop, rock
- Years active: 2005–2015
- Labels: Crossroads of America Records, Pentimento Music Company
- Members: Zachary Melton; Annie Cheek; Kurt Friedrich; Dillon Enright; Ben Claghorn; Steve Marino; Breezy Fox
- Website: rodeorubylove.tumblr.com

Rodeo Ruby Love was a pop/rock band that formed in Marion, Indiana. They were signed to Pentimento Music Company, an independent record label. The band gained prominence in 2011, when they toured with Streetlight Manifesto and Reel Big Fish. Rodeo Ruby released its first album, Your Love Has Made Everything Beautiful, in 2006. They have since released two EP's, three more studio albums, and a live album.

== History ==
=== Formation and early years ===
Rodeo Ruby Love was founded in 2005 by lead singer Zack Melton. Their music is inspired by the church hymns and pop-country radio of Zack Melton's childhood, and the energy of the scene in central Indiana. The band's name Rodeo Ruby Love was inspired by the name of Zack Melton's grandmother, Ruby, and his second favorite Garth Brooks song, "Rodeo". Rodeo Ruby Love recorded its first album, Your Love Has Made Everything Beautiful (2006), in a basement in Bloomington Indiana. They followed the album by simultaneously releasing two EP's, What Loneliness Can Do To You and Honest To God (2007), and touring through the midwest and southeast. Their second album, Vs. The Great American Cities (2008), was released under Crossroads of America Records. The band disbanded in 2015.

=== Rise to prominence ===
The band's popularity started to spread beyond the midwest in 2010. The band released their third album, This Is Why We Don't Have Nice Things (2010), under Crossroads of America Records, and went on their first self-booked national tour. The band signed onto the label Pentimento Music Company, and kicked off the switch with a re-release of This Is Why We Don't Have Nice Things and by going on a national tour with two prominent ska bands, Streetlight Manifesto, and Reel Big Fish, performing to sold-out crowds at nationally recognized venues.

=== Fourth album ===
Rodeo Ruby Love released its fourth album, The Pits, on June 11, 2013, and went on a month-long national tour with Streetlight Manifesto and Empty Orchestra. The album was engineered and mixed by Wes DeBoy and mastered by Carl Saff.

=== News coverage ===
Rodeo Ruby Love has been reviewed and interviewed on several websites. The Pits has been reviewed on Earth to the Ground Music, Obscure Sound, and received a 5 star review in NUVO, an Indianapolis Newspaper. Zach Melton has been interviewed on Live High Five, and Mind Equals Blown. This Is Why We Don't Have Nice Things has been reviewed on Punknews.org.

=== Members ===
Current members

- Zack Melton - lead vocals, guitar (2005–2015)
- Annie Cheek - vocals (2005–2015)
- Kurt Friedrich - keyboard (2005–2015)
- Dillon Enright - drums (2005–2015)
- Ben Claghorn - bass (2005–2015)
- Steve Marino - guitar (2005–2015)

Former members

- Kyle Kammeyer - guitar (2005–2013)
- Stephen Boyd - drums (2007-2010)
- Alexander Case - bass (2007-2009)

== Discography ==
Albums

- Your Love Has Made Everything Beautiful (2006)
- Vs. the Great American Cities (2008)
- This is Why We Don't Have Nice Things (2011) under Pentimento Music Company
- The Pits (2013)

EPs

- What Loneliness Can Do To You (2007)
- Honest To God (2007)

== Discography details ==
=== This Is Why We Don't Have Nice Things ===
Professional ratings
Review scores
Source	Rating
PunkNews.org	3/5 stars
Indie Vision Music	4/5 stars
Real Detroit Weekly	3.5/5 stars

This Is Why We Don't Have Nice Things is the third album, released June 29, 2010 on Crossroads of America Records. It was re-released on September 27, 2011, by Pentimento Music Company. The album was engineered by Wes DeBoy, mixed by Ed Rose and mastered by Mike Fossenkemper. The album received generally positive reviews. Indie Vision Music called it a "fun, thoughtful, and all-around brilliant record."

Track listing

No.	Title	Length
1.	"Elizabeth"	1:37
2.	"America's Funniest Home Videos"	4:39
3.	"Secrets"	2:47
4.	"Black Sunday"	3:41
5.	"The Melody"	4:33
6.	"The Coming Up Roses"	3:53
7.	"Beast of Joy"	2:59
8.	"Kind to Me"	2:54
9.	"Ricky Henderson"	4:15
10.	"No One But Us"	3:39
11.	"Josephine"	4:10
12.	"Careful With That Axe"	3:14
