= Everything Goes Numb =

Studio album by Streetlight Manifesto
- Released: August 26, 2003
- Recorded: 2002–2003
- Genre: Ska punk
- Length: 55:12
- Label: The RISC Group, Victory, Pentimento
- Producer: Tomas Kalnoky

Streetlight Manifesto chronology
Streetlight Manifesto (2002)	Everything Goes Numb (2003)	Keasbey Nights (2006)

Professional ratings
Review scores
Source	Rating
AllMusic	4/5 stars
Punknews.org	5/5 stars
AbsolutePunk	85%

Everything Goes Numb is the debut studio album by American ska punk band Streetlight Manifesto, released on August 26, 2003. It garnered critical acclaim, with critics commenting on the quality of the band's lyrics and their powerful energy. The album has since acquired a cult following among fans of the third wave ska movement. This is the first full-length album frontman and vocalist Tomas Kalnoky participated in since leaving the ska-punk band Catch 22. The track "If and When We Rise Again" quotes the melody of Hungarian Dance No. 5 by Johannes Brahms.

== Track listing ==
All songs written by Tomas Kalnoky

No.	Title	Length
1.	"Everything Went Numb"	3:29
2.	"That'll Be the Day"	4:42
3.	"Point/Counterpoint"	5:27
4.	"If and When We Rise Again"	4:19
5.	"A Better Place, a Better Time"	6:28
6.	"We Are the Few"	4:56
7.	"Failing, Flailing"	5:28
8.	"Here’s to Life"	4:41
9.	"A Moment of Silence"	5:13
10.	"A Moment of Violence"	2:00
11.	"The Saddest Song"	3:18
12.	"The Big Sleep"	5:02
Total length:		55:12

== Personnel ==
- Josh Ansley – bass guitar
- Jim Conti – alto saxophone, clarinet, tenor saxophone
- Jamie Egan – trombone, trumpet, tuba
- Tomas Kalnoky – lead vocals, guitar, layout, lyrics, music, photos, producer, recording
- Paul Lowndes – drum tracking, drums
- Dan Ross – alto saxophone, baritone saxophone

=== Additional personnel ===
- Chris Bailey, Shane Thompson – auxiliary percussion
- Robbie Krieger – cello (track 12)
- Steve Ho, Lico, Jeff Davidson – gang vocals
- Jason Kanter – mixing
- Dominick Maita – mastering
- Natalia Ushak – cover model
