= Wars (song) =

Single by Hurt

from the album Goodbye to the Machine
- Released: February 3, 2009
- Recorded: October 2008, Shorefire Recording Studios, Long Branch, NJ
- Genre: Alternative rock, hard rock
- Length: 3:59
- Label: Amusement
- Songwriter(s): J. Loren Wince, Paul Spatola
- Producer(s): Hurt

Hurt singles chronology
"Loded" (2008)	"Wars" (2009)	"Pills" (2009)

"Wars" is a song by American rock band Hurt. The song was released as the lead single from the band's fifth studio album Goodbye to the Machine. "Wars" peaked at no. 20 on the Billboard Mainstream Rock Songs chart, staying on the chart for 20 weeks.

== Reception ==
AllMusic reviewer Greg Prato favorably compared J. Loren Wince's vocals to Scott Stapp while comparing the music to Tool.

== Track listing ==
No.	Title	Length
1.	"Wars"	3:59

== Personnel ==
- J. Loren Wince – vocals, guitar, piano
- Paul Spatola – guitar, keyboards
- Rek Mohr – bass
- Louie Sciancalepore – drums, percussion
