= The Crux (Hurt album) =

Studio album by HURT
- Released: May 1, 2012
- Genre: Alternative metal; alternative rock; art rock; hard rock
- Length: 44:37
- Label: Carved Records
- Producer: Hurt

HURT chronology
| Goodbye to the Machine (2009) | The Crux (2012) |

The Crux is the sixth and final studio album from the US band Hurt. It was originally to be released on April 24, 2012, on Carved Records label, but was delayed one week to May 1, 2012. The first single, "How We End Up Alone", was released through iTunes on January 3, 2012. The album was reached number 6 on Billboard's Top Hard Rock Albums chart for 2012.

Professional ratings
Review scores
| Source | Rating |
|---|---|
| Rock. Nothing But | 4/5 stars |
| Alternative Addiction | 3.5/5 stars |

== Track listing ==
| No. | Title | Length |
|---|---|---|
| 1. | "So When" | 3:57 |
| 2. | "Eden" | 4:21 |
| 3. | "Links & Waves" | 1:15 |
| 4. | "Sally Slips" | 4:45 |
| 5. | "When It's Cold" | 4:07 |
| 6. | "Adonai" | 6:38 |
| 7. | "Caught in the Rain" | 4:34 |
| 8. | "Cuffed" | 4:00 |
| 9. | "How We End Up Alone" | 4:07 |
| 10. | "Numbers" | 3:09 |
| 11. | "The Seer" | 3:43 |

== Chart history ==
=== Album ===
| Chart (2012) | Peak position |
|---|---|
| Billboard 200 | 71 |
| Top Independent Albums (Billboard) | 9 |
| Top Rock Albums (Billboard) | 27 |
| Top Alternative Albums (Billboard) | 19 |
| Top Hard Rock Albums (Billboard) | 6 |

=== Singles ===
| Year | Single | Peak chart position | | |
| Year | Single | Rock Songs | Mainstream Rock | Active Rock |
|---|---|---|---|---|
| 2012 | "How We End Up Alone" | 43 | 21 | 18 |

== Personnel ==
Hurt

- J. Loren Wince – vocals, guitar, violin, banjo, string arrangement
- Michael Roberts – guitar
- Rek Mohr – bass
- Victor Ribas – drums

Production

- John Kurzweg – mixing
