= Tomas Kalnoky =

American musician (born 1980)

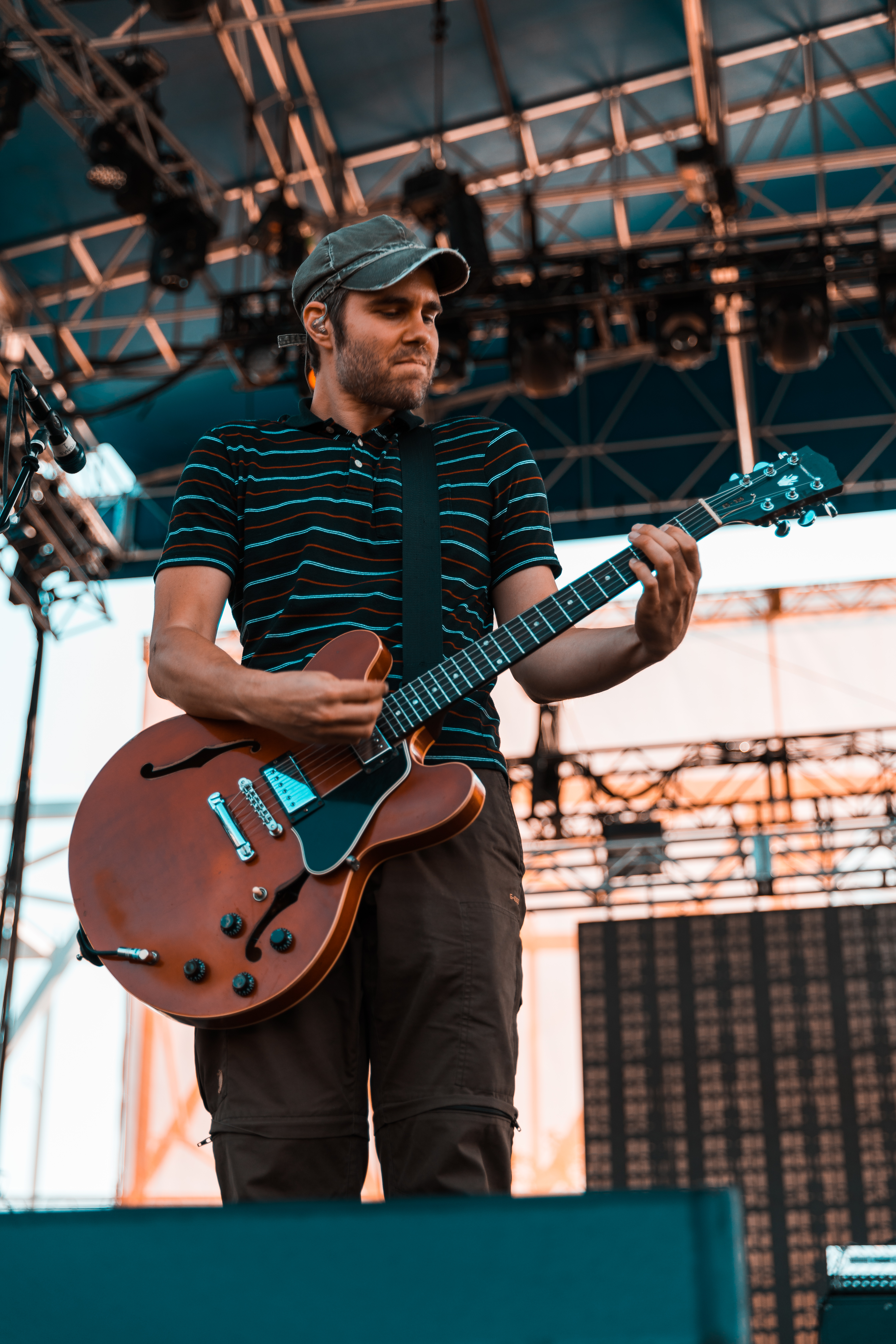
- Kalnoky performing in Cincinnati, Ohio with Streetlight Manifesto on their Summer 2019 tour

Background information
- Also known as: Toh Kay
- Born: December 24, 1980 (age 45); Prague, Czechoslovakia
- Origin: East Brunswick, New Jersey, United States
- Genres: Ska punk, punk rock, world, folk
- Instruments: Guitar, ukulele, drums
- Years active: 1995–present
- Labels: Victory, RISC, Pentimento
- Member of: Streetlight Manifesto; Bandits of the Acoustic Revolution
- Formerly of: Catch 22; Gimp
- Website: www.tohkay.com

Tomas Kalnoky (born December 24, 1980) is a Czechoslovak-born American musician. He is the lead singer/guitarist and songwriter of the bands Streetlight Manifesto and Bandits of the Acoustic Revolution, and goes by the pseudonym Toh Kay as a solo performer. He is the former lead singer/guitarist for 3rd-wave ska band Catch 22, but left the band after making only one album (their debut, Keasbey Nights) to attend Savannah College of Art and Design in Savannah, Georgia, for visual art. According to the booklet of Somewhere in the Between, Kalnoky attended Rutgers University. He is the owner of Pentimento Music Company, a record company.

== Biography ==
Raised in East Brunswick, New Jersey, Kalnoky graduated in 1997 from East Brunswick High School. After high school he attended Rutgers University.

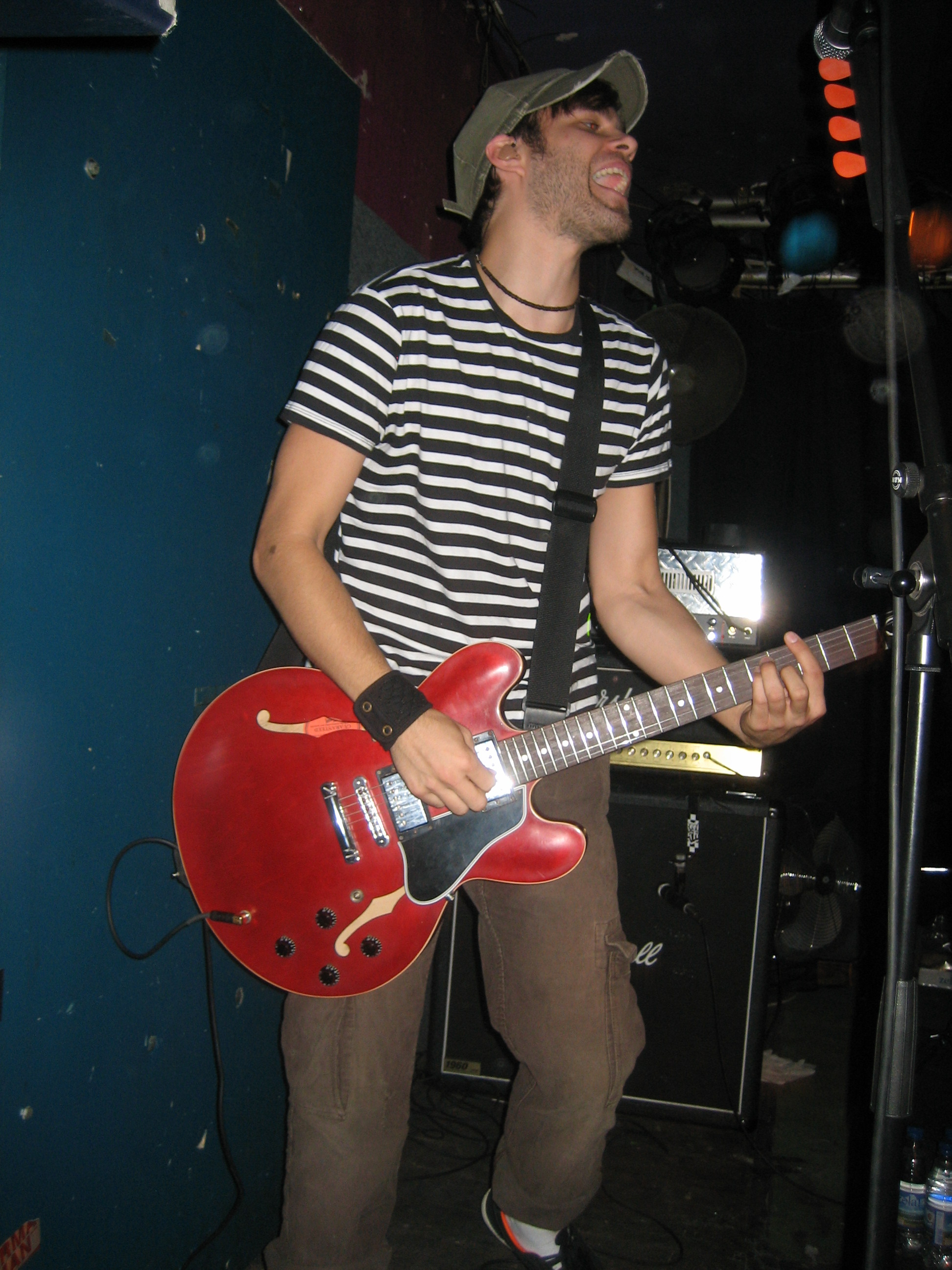
Tomas Kalnoky performing live in 2008

Kalnoky's first foray into the music world began with the punk band Gimp, with whom he released one cassette, Smiles for Macavity, before moving onto Catch 22 (with fellow Gimp members drummer Chris Greer and bassist Jason Scharenguivel). It was in Gimp that Kalnoky first wrote the song "Supernothing" which later appeared on the Catch 22 demo Rules of the Game and the album Keasbey Nights. However, the original version is a much slower acoustic song, which features Kalnoky's brother Achilles on violin (Achilles would later appear on the Bandits EP A Call to Arms, as well as on the first volume of "99 songs of Revolution").

After Kalnoky departed Catch 22, he and two ex-members, Josh Ansley, and Jamie Egan, joined with three ex-members of One Cool Guy, Stuart Karmatz, Dan Ross, and Pete Sibilia, to form Streetlight Manifesto. Despite the horn section, Kalnoky is hesitant to brand them "ska" saying, "Ska is something that you have to tread so lightly with because there are so many, ironically, Nazi-like purists out there who will rip you apart because you don't fit the part of the 'ska band'".

Kalnoky's influences are many, the blending of which creates Streetlight's signature sound. Kalnoky cites The Drifters as a favorite band. Other musical influences include Bad Religion, Nirvana, The Suicide Machines, Squirrel Nut Zippers, and The Dead Milkmen. He has mentioned Czech folk singer Jaromir Nohavica as one of his musical heroes. During one of his early interviews, Kalnoky cited American pop-folk singer Mason Jennings as one of his current CDs playing in his car. Streetlight Manifesto recorded Jennings' Birds Flying Away as a track on "99 Songs of Revolution."

During the 2009 Van's Warped Tour Kalnoky fractured his arm in a bicycle accident, rendering him incapable of playing guitar. While his arm healed, Kalnoky continued to take up the microphone and sing the band's set, with Sean P. Rogan of Big D and the Kids Table filling in on guitar.

Kalnoky is a self-proclaimed perfectionist, explaining the persistent delay of Streetlight Manifesto's second original album, Somewhere in the Between, and the next album by the Bandits of the Acoustic Revolution, which he said in 2007 "will be released by the end of this decade." As of 2025, said BOTAR album has not been released.

In 2010, Streetlight Manifesto released the first volume of 99 Songs of Revolution, the first of "...8 or so records that focus entirely on playing music that other musicians have written." One of the songs however, "They Provide the Paint for the Picture Perfect Masterpiece that You Will Paint on the Insides of Your Eyelids," is originally written by Kalnoky and performed by his "side project," Bandits of the Acoustic Revolution. The project/record was originally planned to be solely by Bandits of the Acoustic Revolution, but, as time went on, it faded into a project containing both Streetlight and BOTAR, as well as 2 other potential bands. For this reason, BOTAR has been called "the single least prolific musical group on the face of the planet," by the Pentimento Music Company, a member of the RISC Group. Also in 2010, Kalnoky released a split CD with Dan Potthast of MU330 entitled You By Me: Vol. 1, under the pseudonym "Toh Kay." The first official Toh Kay music video is his interpretation of "I've Set Sail," originally by Potthast, animated by Eric Power of Inked Reality.

On January 29, 2013, Kalnoky announced that he would perform seven shows as part of The Revival Tour alongside Chuck Ragan, Dave Hause of The Loved Ones, Jenny Owen Youngs, Rocky Votolato, Jenny O., and Tim McIlrath of Rise Against. He would later announce 5 additional dates.

== Discography ==
=== Gimp ===
- Smiles for Macavity (Cassette) (1996)

=== Catch 22 ===
- Rules of the Game (EP) (Cassette) (1997)
- Keasbey Nights (1998)

=== Bandits of the Acoustic Revolution ===
- A Call to Arms (EP) (2001)

=== Streetlight Manifesto ===
- Streetlight Manifesto (EP) (2002)
- Everything Goes Numb (2003)
- Keasbey Nights (2006)
- Somewhere in the Between (2007)
- 99 Songs of Revolution: Vol. 1 (2010)
- The Hands That Thieve (2013)
- The Place Behind the Stars (2026)

=== Toh Kay ===
- You By Me: Vol. 1 (With Dan Potthast of MU330 and The Stitch Up) (2010)
- Streetlight Lullabies (2011)
- The Hand That Thieves (2013)
- You By Me: Vol. 2 (with Sycamore Smith, formerly of the Muldoons) (2014)
