= Goodbye to the Machine =

Studio album by HURT
- Released: April 7, 2009
- Recorded: October 2008, Shorefire Recording Studios, Long Branch, NJ
- Genre: Alternative rock, art rock, hard rock
- Length: 54:08
- Label: Amusement
- Producer: HURT

HURT chronology
Vol. II (2007)	Goodbye to the Machine (2009)	The Crux (2012)

Professional ratings
Review scores
Source	Rating
Allmusic	3.5/5 stars
TuneLab Music	6/10 stars
Type 3 Media	10/10 stars

Goodbye to the Machine is the fifth studio album from American band Hurt, released on April 7, 2009, on the independent Amusement record label. The album was released in both CD and vinyl format. On February 3, 2009, the song "Wars" was released for download as a single. Each CD and vinyl comes with a unique code to download "ultra-high-quality MP3s sampled directly from the analog 1/2" master tapes," as well as bonus tracks, including "Flowers", "Another Time" and "That (Such a Thing) – Jazz Club Mix".

== Track listing ==
=== Side 1 ===
No.	Title	Length
1.	"Got Jealous"	4:41
2.	"Pandora"	4:52
3.	"Wars"	3:59
4.	"World Ain't Right" (featuring Shaun Morgan)	3:32
5.	"Sweet Delilah"	3:27
6.	"1331"	3:15

=== Side 2 ===
No.	Title	Length
7.	"Role Martyr"	4:36
8.	"Well"	3:57
9.	"Pills"	3:58
10.	"Dreams Away"	3:49
11.	"Fighting Tao"	4:25
12.	"That (Such a Thing)" (includes hidden track "Flowers")	9:31

=== Downloadable bonus tracks ===
No.	Title	Length
1.	"Flowers" (at the end of "That (Such A Thing)")	4:38
2.	"Another Time"	6:45
3.	"That (Such a Thing) – Jazz Club Mix"	4:21

== Charts ==
Chart (2009)	Peak position
US Billboard 200	112
US Top Heatseekers	1
US Top Independent Albums	6
US Top Alternative Albums	22
US Top Hard Rock Albums	15
US Top Internet Albums	25

=== Singles ===
Year	Single	Peak Chart Position
Year	Single	US Mainstream Rock
2009	"Wars"	20
2009	"Pills (Remix)"	—

== Personnel ==
Personnel information from album liner notes

- J. Loren Wince - vocals, violin, guitar
- Paul Spatola - guitar, keyboards, background vocals
- Rek Mohr - bass
- Lou Sciancalepore - drums, percussion

=== Additional personnel ===
- Shaun Morgan - vocals on "World Ain't Right"
- Joe DeMaio - engineering, mixing
- Michael Roberts - engineering, mixing
- Eric Sarafin - mixing on "That (Such A Thing)"
- Bernie Grundman - mastering
- Ilene Novog - string arrangement on "World Ain't Right"
- Sean Odell - artwork, design
- Anthony Honn - photography
