= Sycamore Smith =

American musician

Sycamore Smith is the stage name of Marc Smith, a musician from Marquette, Michigan. Smith, formerly of The Muldoons, has toured the United States with his comic brand of folk music, complete with derby hat, guitar, and gold-plated resonator kazoo. He is signed to the Pentimento Music Company.

Though still little known outside of the Michigan area, since his stint as lead singer of The Muldoons, Smith has built a reputation as an accomplished lyricist.

Smith writes folk songs in an old-fashioned, vaudevillian rural style; songs about heroes and swindlers where characters including Wolfskin Rosie, Legless Paul, and Bobo have adventures that are at times triumphant and other times melancholic. Sycamore uses his first name when referring to himself in his songs (as in The Razor Ball).

Most recently, Smith appeared on an episode of The Happy Birthday Podcast in which he revealed that he would never change his birthday for anything in the whole world.

== Discography ==
- Grosspapa (2017)
- You By Me: Vol. 2 (with Toh Kay) (2014)
- Sycotron (with Troy Graham) (2012)
- Redux (2011)
- Sickdom (2008)
- Baboon (2007)
- Sycamore Smith & The Pendulum (2006)
- M...Some Racy Hits! (2005)

With The Gray Beast:

- Demos (2015)
- Syc Nurse (with Wett Nurse) (2013)

With The Redettes:

- Ed (2011)

With The Muldoons:

- You Are Lost & Gone Forever, Dreadful Sorry, the Muldoons (2004)
- The Wreck of the Muldoons (2001)
- Goodnight Muldoons, Goodnight Muldoons, I'll See You In My Dreams (recorded in 1997, released in 2011)
- DiM (1994)
- New Low (1993)

Guest Appearances:

- What Was That Sound? by Papa Crow (2012) (Song: Fart like a Pirate)

Compilations:

- Snickers New Music Search 1990-1991 Presented By Campus Voice Semi Finalists (1991) (The Muldoons: Rot)
- Misery Sessions Vol. 1 (1994) (The Muldoons: In Something)
- Misery Sessions Vol. 2 (1995) (The Muldoons: All Fours)
- Misery Sessions Vol. 3 (1996) (The Muldoons: Remote)
- Misery Four (1997) (The Muldoons: Every Single Last One)
- Misery 5 (2003) (The Muldoons: Shanty-Town Lullaby)
- Pentimento Music Company Summer/Fall 2011 Sampler (2011) (The Man with the Skeleton Arms) & (The Reaper's Favor)
- Isolated Culture Vol. 1 (2013) (The Gray Beast: The Figmoron Tree)
