= Bandits of the Acoustic Revolution =

American musical collective

- Origin: United States
- Genres: Acoustic, classical, folk, ska
- Years active: 2001–present
- Labels: Pentimento, RISC
- Members: Tomas Kalnoky; Jamie Egan; Nick Afflitto; Marcy Ciuffreda; Rachel Goldstein; Matt Dannenberg; Layton Hayes; John Paul Jones; Achilles Kalnoky; Paul Lowndes; Chris Paszik; Mark Rendeiro; Dan Ross; Pete Sibilia; Shane Thompson; Natalia Ushak
- Website: http://www.acousticbandits.com

Bandits of the Acoustic Revolution (BOTAR) is a musical collective including influences from ska, punk, classical, and eastern European music, entirely in an acoustic format including classically trained musicians. It is composed of former Catch 22 members Tomas Kalnoky and Jamie Egan, in addition to Nick Afflitto, Marcy Ciuffreda, Matt Dannenberg, Rachel Goldstein, Layton Hayes, John Paul Jones, Achilles Kalnoky, Paul Lowndes, Chris Paszik, Mark Rendeiro, Dan Ross, Pete Sibilia, Shane Thomson, and Natalia Ushak.

== Career ==
They self-released their first recording, an EP entitled A Call to Arms, in late 2001. Among its five songs was a new arrangement of the Catch 22 song "Dear Sergio", originally written by Tomas Kalnoky, which included a new verse and a minor renaming to "Hey Sergio:". They quickly sold out of their self-produced album, deciding to then offer it on their homepage for free. The EP has since been re-released in CD-DA format.

Bandits of the Acoustic Revolution can be considered only a smaller side project, as it has taken a back seat to Tomas Kalnoky's main focus, Streetlight Manifesto. A few of BOTAR's members belong to Streetlight Manifesto. As of late 2003, BOTAR has been placed on hiatus while Streetlight Manifesto tours, but there are plans for future recordings. Both bands are members of The RISC Group.

They have two LPs that have been in the works since 2001: 99 Songs of Revolution and an as yet untitled album. 99 Songs is to be a wide-ranging 8-record collection of covers, with only two of the records done by BOTAR (two others will be produced by Streetlight Manifesto and four will be performed by two Streetlight Manifesto-related projects, with two for each group). The untitled album is planned to be original material.

In an October 8, 2006 interview, Kalnoky said that 30 songs are written and expected to be released by BOTAR.

According to an update on March 16, the next album would hopefully be released around the time of or after Streetlight Manifesto's next release, which was released on November 13, 2007. However, the update also states, "But we're dealing with you-know-who here so expect it sometime before the end of our current decade". The update also contained a recruitment statement for musicians of certain instruments who live in the Los Angeles area. To form a West Coast Division, the band wants skilled musicians for recording and hopefully touring. Also in the update was information about Pentimento Music Company, stating that it is a small label that will be releasing the group's future albums and that its website is soon to be running. The update also stated that both BOTAR and Streetlight Manifesto have recruited people to start helping with updates to the websites.

"The 99 Songs of Revolution Project will consist of 8 full length records. Two from SM, two from BOTAR, and two each from two other SM related groups. Yes, this is indeed the record that Victory mistakenly posted as coming out in Oct of 08. Not sure how they got that date, but it was never even a possibility. The first SM record for 99SOR will be out March 16, 2010, simultaneously with another of the 8 CDs (no, not the BOTAR one). Victory will be putting out the CDs and mp3s and Pentimento will be releasing and distributing the vinyl. We are aware of our reputation to take forever to release records and miss our self imposed deadlines, so we are not giving anyone solid dates, not even our labels. Early 09 release, that's it. We are, though, working hard on it. The demos are all but done and we head into the studio to begin tracking in October. Our upcoming tour schedule, as you know, is borderline impossible/insane, so cut us some slack".

An April 3, 2009 update to their website states

"As for 99 Songs, sit tight a tiny bit longer. The record is out of our hands now, in terms of recording, so we're all waiting at this point. We'll be posting a track list on the site very soon".

On the November 17, 2009, update to the Streetlight Manifesto website, the band writes "we will be heading into the studio soon (as is a particular electricity deficient collective..)", implying that Bandits of the Acoustic Revolution will begin recording their first full-length album (part of the 99 Songs of Revolution project) in the near future.

On August 23, 2017, their official website was updated to only feature links to their newly minted social media accounts.

== Members ==
- Tomas Kalnoky (guitar, vocals, songwriter)
- Jamie Egan (trombone)
- Nick Afflitto (trumpet)
- Marcy Ciuffreda (cello)
- Rachel Goldstein (viola, vocals)
- Matt Dannenberg (vocals)
- Layton Hayes (piano)
- John Paul Jones (trumpet)
- Achilles Kalnoky (violin)
- Paul Lowndes (drums)
- Chris Paszik (double bass)
- Mark Rendeiro (horn)
- Dan Ross (baritone saxophone, alto saxophone)
- Pete Sibilia (tenor saxophone)
- Shane Thompson (congas, timbales)
- Natalia Ushak (vocals)
- Dan Potthast (guitar)

== Discography ==
- A Call to Arms (EP) (2001)

== See also ==
- Tomas Kalnoky
- Streetlight Manifesto
- Catch 22
