= Pentimento Music Company =

American independent record label

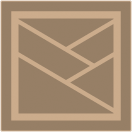
- Founded: 2007
- Founder: Tomas Kalnoky
- Genre: Indie rock, ska
- Country of origin: U.S.
- Location: Los Angeles, California
- Official website: www.pentimentomusic.com

Pentimento Music Company is an American independent record label founded by Streetlight Manifesto frontman Tomas Kalnoky. Pentimento was launched in 2007 to re-release A Call to Arms, the 2002 debut EP from Bandits of the Acoustic Revolution. Pentimento has since released albums related to Dan Potthast and Tomas Kalnoky and their respective bands. While Streetlight Manifesto was signed to Victory Records, Pentimento was responsible for the vinyl release of the band's 2010 album, 99 Songs of Revolution: Volume 1, which is possibly due to a deal in which Pentimento and Victory "co-release project-type records." In 2011, Pentimento signed Indiana-based indie rock band Rodeo Ruby Love. In 2017, after legal disputes with Victory Records were settled, Streetlight Manifesto is now fully signed to Pentimento.

== Current roster ==
=== Current artists ===
- Bandits of the Acoustic Revolution
- Dan Potthast
- Empty Orchestra
- Lionize
- The Stitch Up
- Streetlight Manifesto
- Sycamore Smith
- Toh Kay

=== Former artists ===
- Rodeo Ruby Love
