= Somewhere in the Between =

Studio album by Streetlight Manifesto
- Released: November 13, 2007
- Genre: Ska punk
- Length: 44:28
- Label: Victory

Streetlight Manifesto chronology
Keasbey Nights (2006)	Somewhere in the Between (2007)	99 Songs of Revolution: Vol. 1 (2010)

Somewhere in the Between is the third studio album by American ska punk band Streetlight Manifesto.

== Release ==
In July and August 2007, Streetlight Manifesto supported Less Than Jake and Reel Big Fish on their co-headlining US tour. On August 23, 2007, the group revealed the name of their next album: Somewhere in the Between. On September 7, the album was announced for release in two months' time, and the album's track listing and artwork was posted online. "We Will Fall Together" and "Down, Down, Down to Mephisto's Cafe" were released as a double A-side single in October, 2007. Somewhere in the Between was released on November 13, 2007; the band had been selling CD copies at one of their shows four days prior. In November and December 2007, the band went on a US tour alongside Suburban Legends and the Stitch Up. On November 26, an animated music video was released for "We Will Fall Together". A version of it had appeared online the previous of it, which was reported to be a rough cut. They ended the year supporting Less Than Jake on their headlining tour of Australia.

Streetlight Manifesto played a handful of West Coast and Midwestern shows in January 2008, prior to a tour of Europe with Reel Big Fish until March 2008. Between March and May 2008, the band toured the US with ZOX and Dan Potthast, which included appearances at the Bamboozle Left and The Bamboozle festivals. Partway through this, saxophonist Jim Conti had to be hospitalized because of a facial infection; the band continued touring with a shorter set and more of an emphasis on songs from Everything Goes Numb. In October 2008, the band played a handful of US shows with the Swellers and the A.K.A.s, prior to an Australian tour with the Resignators and Dan Potthast and a Japan tour with Potthast. They ended the year with a tour of the UK with Random Hand and Potthast. In January 2009, the band went on tour with Reel Big Fish and One Pin Short. Following this, the band went on a headlining tour of the US, with support from A Wilhelm Scream, the Swellers and the Stitch Up, until February 2009. Between late June and late August, the band performed on the Warped Tour. On August 12, 2009, a music video was released for "Would You Be Impressed?".

== Reception ==
Professional ratings
Review scores
Source	Rating
AllMusic	3.5/5 stars
Punknews.org	3.5/5 stars
PopMatters	7/10

Punknews.org ranked the album at number 19 on their list of the year's 20 best releases.

== Track listing ==
All tracks are written by Tomas Kalnoky.

No.	Title	Length
1.	"We Will Fall Together"	4:49
2.	"Down, Down, Down to Mephisto's Cafe"	5:03
3.	"Would You Be Impressed?"	3:22
4.	"One Foot on the Gas, One Foot in the Grave"	5:28
5.	"Watch It Crash"	4:43
6.	"Somewhere in the Between"	3:43
7.	"Forty Days"	3:53
8.	"The Blonde Lead the Blind"	4:49
9.	"The Receiving End of It All"	5:18
10.	"What a Wicked Gang Are We"	3:23
Total length:		44:28

== Personnel ==
=== Streetlight Manifesto ===
- Mike Brown – alto saxophone, baritone saxophone, backing vocals
- Jim Conti – alto, tenor saxophone, backing vocals
- Tomas Kalnoky – vocals, guitar, songwriting, artwork, layout, mixing
- Pete McCullough – bass guitar, backing vocals
- Mike Soprano – trombone, backing vocals
- Matt Stewart – trumpet, backing vocals
- Chris Thatcher – drums
- Demian Arriaga – percussion

=== Additional personnel ===
- Mark R. Sullivan – photography
- Amanda Stevens – photography
- Jason Kanter – assistant mixing
- Alan Douches – mastering

== Chart performance ==
Chart (2007)	Peak position
US Billboard 200	154
US Billboard Heatseekers Albums	2
US Billboard Independent Albums	18
