= Hurt (band) =

American rock band

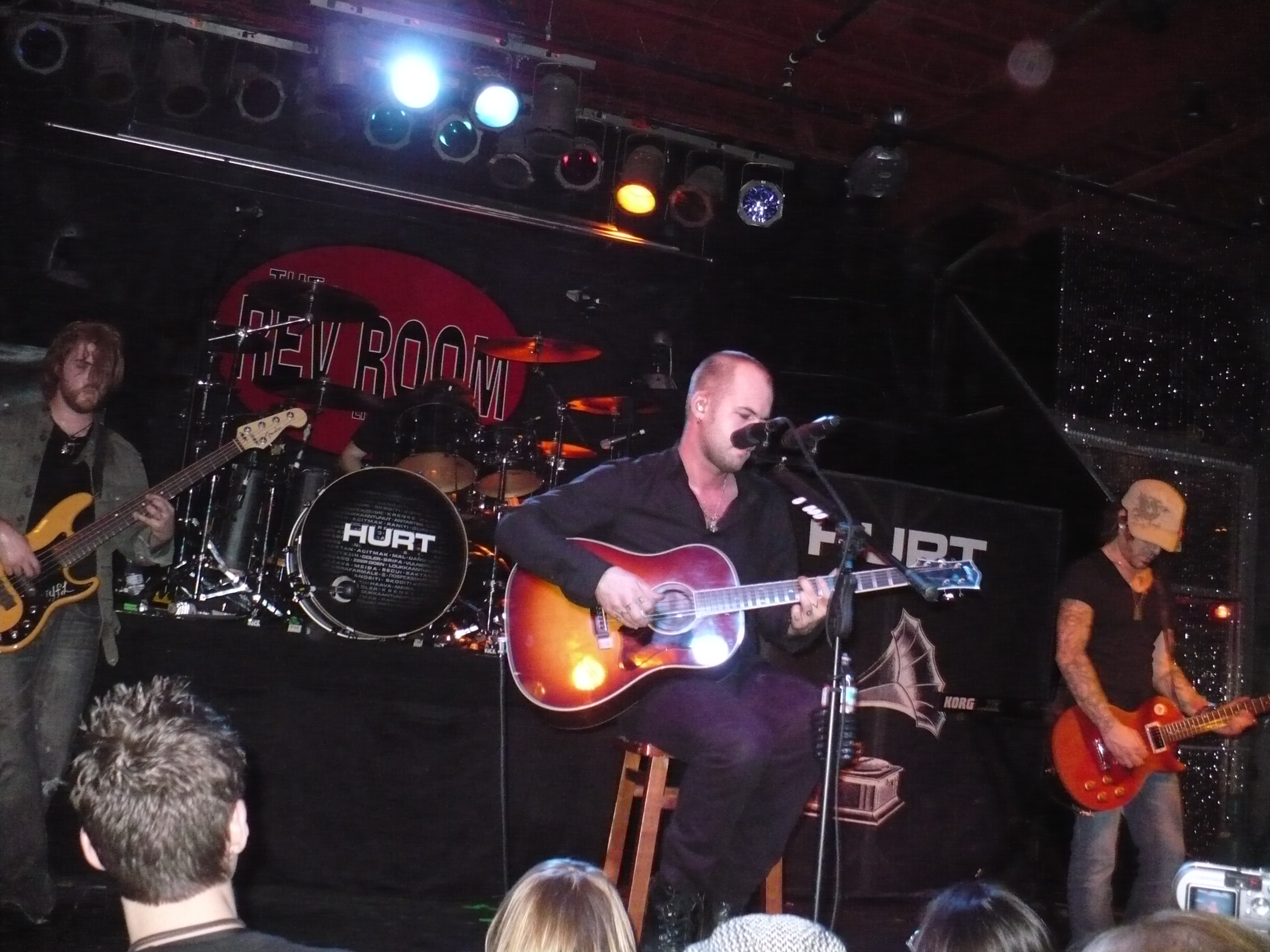
- HURT performing at the Rev Room in Little Rock, Arkansas, 2008

Background information
- Origin: Virginia, U.S.
- Genres: Alternative rock; art rock; hard rock; post-grunge
- Years active: 2000–2015
- Labels: Carved Records; Capitol Records
- Past members: J. Loren Wince; Victor Ribas; Wilson Quaintance IV; Stephen Fletcher; Shawn Sawyer; Paul Spatola; Joshua Ansley; Evan Johns; Louie Sciancalepore; Rek Mohr; Michael Roberts

Hurt, stylized as HURT, was an American rock band formed in Virginia in 2000. The band has released four major label albums. They first released the independent albums Hurt in 2000 and The Consumation in 2003. HURT released their major label debut album, Vol. 1, on March 21, 2006. The singles "Rapture" and "Falls Apart" received significant radio airplay. Their second album was the critically acclaimed Vol. II, released on September 25, 2007, and they had their largest radio hit yet with the single "Ten Ton Brick".

The band released two more albums, Goodbye to the Machine and The Crux. They disbanded in 2015 a year after Self-Entitled, a re-release of their first album came out. No music has been released since 2012. Cryptic videos were posted to the band's official Facebook page on December 24 and 27, 2019, suggesting the band would release new songs.

== History ==
=== Formation and independent releases (2000–2005) ===
HURT was originally composed of J. Loren Wince, 15, the main singer, songwriter, and guitarist and Wil Quaintance on drums. They looked for other band members for years until picking up Steven Fletcher to play bass guitar. The band was named two years later, upon conception of their first album.

J. Loren Wince, HURT's lead singer, performing in Little Rock

Their self-titled first studio album was written and performed by Wince and Quaintance with programming credits given to Brian Winshell for the album, except "Confession" by Jonathan Minis. About 1200 copies of the album were released in 2000. The band's second independently released album, The Consumation was also written and performed by Wince with Quaintance playing drums, Shawn Sawyer on bass and given credits on the song "Unclean" with Winshell on engineering for "House of Cards" and "Velvet Rolls Royce". The album was released in 2003 in Wince's home state of Virginia, with approximately 2000 sold and about 3000 promos and full albums given away.

Jay Silverman, a friend of Tom Lewis (who was formerly in A&R at Universal Records) passed the band's CD (with the original lineup) to Lewis at a show at The Continental in Midtown Manhattan in New York. Eight months later they heard from Lewis again. The band met with Lewis and his company (Metropolitan Hybrid). HURT recorded a demo to find a record label. After undisclosed circumstances with Quaintance, with Wince's agreement, session drummer Evan Johns was asked to be part of the project. During the search for a label, Sawyer decided it would be best if he quit the band. Former Streetlight Manifesto bassist Josh Ansley was found to replace him.

Paul Spatola said that Ansley called him saying that he should fly to New York City and try out for the band, as they were looking for a guitarist. Spatola said, "A month later I didn't hear anything and I said 'I just gotta fly out there.'" His first performance with the band was at The Mint and Spatola intended on being with the band for a few days but ended up staying for two weeks. The first day he tried out for the band and with a little help from Tom Lewis, Wince was convinced to bring Spatola into the band.

The next day, the band played a showcase in Manhattan, New York. At the time, they had spoken with several record companies including Columbia Records, Interscope Records, Island Records, Universal, Virgin Records, and Atlantic Records, but nothing came of the conversations. Initially, Capitol Records purchased the album, Vol. 1, from the band at cost which was approximately $100k. No apparent changes other than signing over the recordings rights to them happened.

=== Vol. 1 and Vol. II (2006–2008) ===
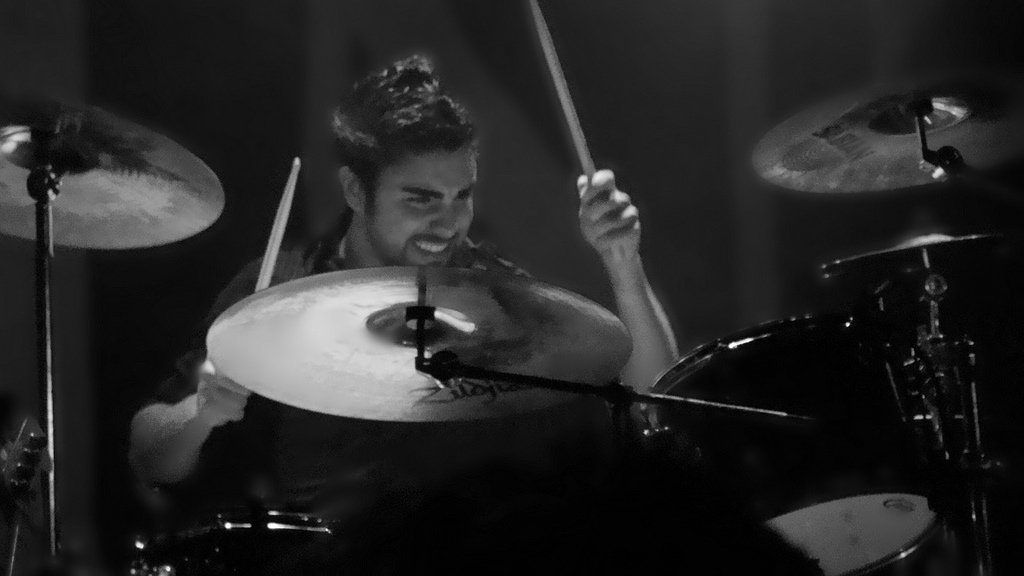
Victor Ribas, HURT's drummer

The band recorded two albums entitled Vol. 1 and Vol. II under Capitol. They were both recorded and produced with Eric Greedy. The plan was to have the albums be released as a double album, but Capitol rejected the idea as being "too much of an investment at once". Instead, the band used the extra time to re-record and improve Vol. II. Vol. 1 was released on March 21, 2006. Three singles were released to radio, "Rapture", "Falls Apart", and "Danse Russe". Vol. II was later released on September 25, 2007, along with two more singles, "Ten Ton Brick" and "Loded".

After the deal with Capitol, the band opted to re-release The Consumation as The Re-Consumation on February 19, 2008. That was in response to fans spending hundreds of dollars to buy their now-rare original independent releases. The re-release contained a new song and two altered songs. In April 2008, Ansley announced his departure from the band, to pursue a career in writing and directing. On May 12, 2009, HURT received an award for the song "Ten Ton Brick" during SESAC's 13th annual New York Music Awards.

=== Goodbye to the Machine (2009–2010) ===
Vol. 1 and Vol. II were not commercial successes and as a result, the band was dropped from Capitol Records. Their next album, Goodbye to the Machine, is an allusion to the band's negativity towards major record labels. It was released on April 7, 2009, on a much smaller label Amusement Records. Prior to the release, the single "Wars" was released to radio on February 3, 2009. The album peaked at No.100 on the Billboard 200.

=== The Crux (2010–2014) ===
HURT began working on new songs in early 2010. On February 5, "Numbers" made its debut radio play on 94.1 WJJO in Madison, Wisconsin. It was released on iTunes on March 9, 2010, with artwork by Paul Spatola. On March 21, the band announced that all tracking had been completed. In August, they announced that they had signed to Carved Records aiming to release an album in early 2012. It was also announced that Spatola had left the band due to personal issues. On September 27, 2011, on HURT's Facebook page, the band said that the new album would be a return to the sound and style to both of the Vol. albums.

The first single, "How We End Up Alone", was released through iTunes on January 3, 2012, and peaked at No. 10 on the Billboard 200. The Crux was released on May 1, 2012, and peaked at Number 75 on Billboard 200. That was the highest Billboard placement in the band's history and the last music released by the band.

On April 8, 2014, Amusement Management announced their intentions to release a remastered version of the often spoke of the band's self-titled album saying, "It will be remastered and come with a handwritten replication of the lyrics by J. It will most likely not be available digitally". The announcement was made on the band's Facebook. The album was released in a limited quantity of only 2000, each individual numbered and signed by J. Loren Wince. The album included two bonus tracks; one previously unreleased, "Cellophane", and another, the original version of "Talking to God".

== Members ==
Former members

- J. Loren Wince – lead vocals, guitar, violin (2000–2015)
- Stephen Fletcher – bass (2000)
- Shawn Sawyer – bass (2000–2004)
- Joshua Ansley – bass, backing vocals (2004–2008)
- Rek Mohr – bass (2008–2013)
- Wil Quaintance – drums (2000–2004)
- Evan Johns – drums (2004–2008)
- Louie Sciancalepore – drums (2008–2010)
- Victor Ribas – drums, percussion, piano, backing vocals (2010–2015)
- Paul Spatola – lead guitar, piano, backing vocals (2004–2011)
- Michael Roberts – guitar, backing vocals (2009–2012)

== Discography ==
Studio albums

- Hurt (2000)
- The Consumation (2003)
- Vol. 1 (2006)
- Vol. II (2007)
- Goodbye to the Machine (2009)
- The Crux (2012)
