= Josh Ansley =

American musical artist

Joshua Ansley
- Origin: New Jersey, US
- Instrument: Bass

Joshua David Ansley was the bass player for the band HURT and the ska bands Catch 22 and Streetlight Manifesto. Raised in Old Bridge Township, New Jersey, United States, Ansley was a Ford model and an actor as a tween/preteen. He was in Social Butterfly, an alternative band that also featured future HURT guitarist and bandmate Paul Spatola. Then he joined the pop-punk band The Youth Ahead before graduating high school and eventually joined the influential ska-punk group Catch 22. Josh went to Mason Gross School of the Arts at Rutgers University to study acting and also attended the London Academy of Theatre at The Globe. While in London he wrote a play in Iambic Pentameter called Cirque de Lumiere which he later produced back at home. He took off a year of school to tour with the band Catch 22. He played a fretless bass when he started but later for Streetlight Manifesto, he played a five-string bass. Ansley left Catch 22 a few months after the original release of Keasbey Nights in order to finish his degree. After graduating with a Bachelor of Fine Arts in Theatre, he rejoined with Tomas Kalnoky to form Streetlight Manifesto. He played with them for a while and recorded bass on the album Everything Goes Numb, released on Victory Records and the RISC Group, before later leaving to move to Los Angeles; he was then replaced by Chris Paszik.

He became the bass player for the band HURT on Capitol Records, which toured with Alice In Chains, Staind, Three Days Grace, Breaking Benjamin, Seether and others. He played on HURT's major label debut Volume I which came out March 21, 2006, and Volume II which was released on September 25, 2007. On April 3, 2008, he announced via HURT's forums and their Myspace page that he would be leaving the band to pursue different avenues.

== After 2008 ==
As of May 2025, Ansley is the spiritual advisor for Avisa, a mental health/addiction recovery service in Toms River, New Jersey.
