= Streetlight Manifesto =

American ska punk band from New Jersey

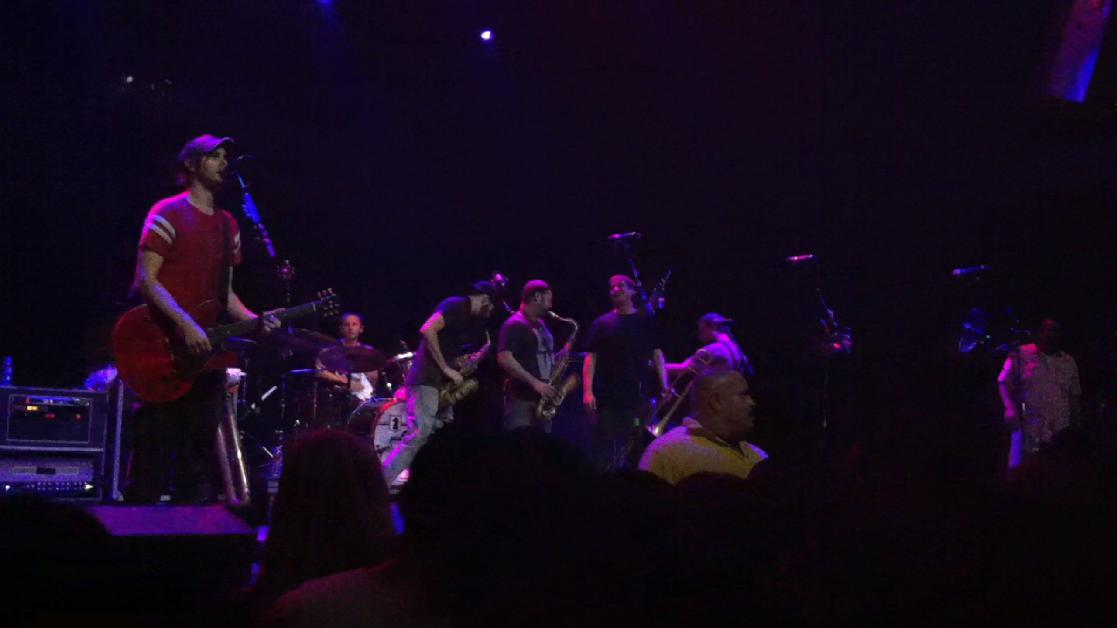
- Streetlight Manifesto performing at the Mayan Theatre in 2012. Left to right: Kalnoky, Thatcher, Brown, Conti, Nirenberg, McCullough, and Stewart.

Background information
- Origin: New Brunswick, New Jersey, United States
- Genres: Punk rock; ska punk
- Years active: 2002–present
- Labels: Victory; RISC; Pentimento
- Spinoff of: Catch 22; Bandits of the Acoustic Revolution
- Members: Tomas Kalnoky; Jim Conti; Chris Thatcher; Mike Brown; Pete McCullough; Karl Lyden; Dan Ross; Joshua Gawel
- Past members: Jamie Egan; Josh Ansley; Stuart Karmatz; Pete Sibilia; Paul Lowndes; Mike Soprano; Chris Paszik; Delano Bonner; Nadav Nirenberg; Matt Stewart
- Website: www.streetlightmanifesto.com

Streetlight Manifesto is an American ska punk band from New Brunswick, New Jersey, formed in 2002. They released their debut album, Everything Goes Numb, through Victory Records on August 26, 2003. The band headlined and sold out their first concert at Rutgers University in New Brunswick on December 9, 2003. Several members were previously involved in New Jersey's third wave ska scene, most notably Tomas Kalnoky, a founding member of Catch 22, and members of the band One Cool Guy. Kalnoky and several other members also attended Rutgers University.

== History ==
=== 2001–2002: Formation ===
Kalnoky, Ansley and Egan (also from New Jersey) had previously been members of Catch 22. In 2002, Kalnoky gathered a large number of musicians—including Ansley and Egan, several members of One Cool Guy, his brother Achilles, and several of Achilles' orchestra friends—to perform on the Bandits of the Acoustic Revolution EP, A Call to Arms. Included on the five track independently released CD is "Here's to Life", a song which Streetlight Manifesto reworked and included on Everything Goes Numb, and a new version of Catch 22's "Dear Sergio", which included a new verse. Both Streetlight and the Bandits are members of The RISC Group, a collaboration of artists to self produce and retain rights to their music.

=== 2003–2004: Everything Goes Numb ===
Streetlight Manifesto's first recording consisted of a four-track demo EP, featuring the songs "Everything Went Numb", "Point/Counterpoint", "The Saddest Song" and "We Are the Few", all of which were re-recorded for their debut album. The line-up that recorded the demo consisted almost entirely of musicians from Bandits of the Acoustic Revolution: Josh Ansley (bass guitar), Jamie Egan (trombone and trumpet), Tomas Kalnoky (guitar and vocals), Stuart Karmatz (drums), Dan Ross (alto and baritone saxophone) and Pete Sibilia (tenor saxophone). The band was signed to Victory Records, the same label as Catch 22.

After the demo was recorded Karmatz left and was replaced by Paul Lowndes and Jim Conti took the place of Pete Sibilia. This line-up then recorded Everything Goes Numb, but changed again before the band could perform any live shows. Jamie Egan played both trumpet and trombone while recording, but as he would not be able to do this live, Mike Soprano joined on trombone. Paul Lowndes resigned as drummer and was replaced by Chris Thatcher.

=== 2004–2007: More lineup changes and continued touring ===
In September 2004, Ansley announced his departure to pursue an acting career. The next departure was Egan, who left on January 22, 2005, before Streetlight Manifesto began the Ska Is Dead 2 tour, headlining alongside MU330 and the Voodoo Glow Skulls. Delano Bonner came in to play trumpet starting on January 25, 2005, performing at Rowan University in Glassboro, New Jersey. Dan Ross had planned to leave after the Ska Is Dead 2 tour to pursue a business career, but was forced to leave early just before the end of the tour due to a family crisis. He would later go on to teach math at Piscataway High School. He was replaced by Mike Brown, whose first concert was at the start of the European tour. Brown's first concert in the United States was on May 31, 2005 in Baltimore.

In April 2005, the band headed overseas to Europe for their first tour outside North America despite personnel difficulties, including visa trouble for various members. Then in October 2005, in Jacksonville, Florida, the band's van was broken into; in total around $80,000 worth of instruments, merchandise, and personal belongings were stolen. Following the burglary and theft, the band was forced to cancel their following four shows. In November 2005, they were robbed again, in Paris, France, and the band lost "the one expensive piece of equipment that wasn't stolen in last month's debacle, a 24 track hard drive recorder we've been using to document our live shows." Sometime between December 3, 2006 and July 3, 2007, Delano Bonner left the band. Sometime before the recording of Somewhere in the Between, Matt Stewart took over for Bonner.

=== 2006–2010: Keasbey Nights and Somewhere in the Between ===
In 2004, Kalnoky decided to re-record Keasbey Nights, originally recorded by his previous band Catch 22. The decision was prompted by Victory Records' plan to re-release the album with additional content. The Streetlight Manifesto version was originally scheduled to be released in late 2004, but was continually delayed until being released on March 7, 2006.

Streetlight Manifesto's second album, Somewhere in the Between, was released in November 2007 through Victory Records to generally positive reviews.

=== 2010–2012: 99 Songs of Revolution ===
99 Songs of Revolution is a collaborative project that intended to consist of two full-length albums by Streetlight Manifesto, two full-length albums by the Bandits of the Acoustic Revolution; as well as four other albums, two each by two other Streetlight-related artists. The project consists entirely of cover songs. Volume No. 1 of the project was released by Streetlight Manifesto on March 16, 2010, and is the only volume of the project released as of 2026.

=== 2012–2016: The Hands That Thieve, The End of the Beginning Tour and Victory Records dispute ===
On August 22, 2012, the band announced that their new album would be called The Hands That Thieve. It was originally set to be released on November 6, 2012. On October 23, however, Tomas addressed the fans of their Facebook page, apologizing that he would need to set the release date back to sometime in January 2013. Victory Records was slated to announce the release date on February 1, 2013, but did not follow through. On February 15, it was announced by Victory Records that the album would be released on April 30, 2013. An acoustic version of the album was released by Toh Kay on the same date with the name The Hand That Thieves. The album was leaked on April 19, 2013. The album has received positive reviews.

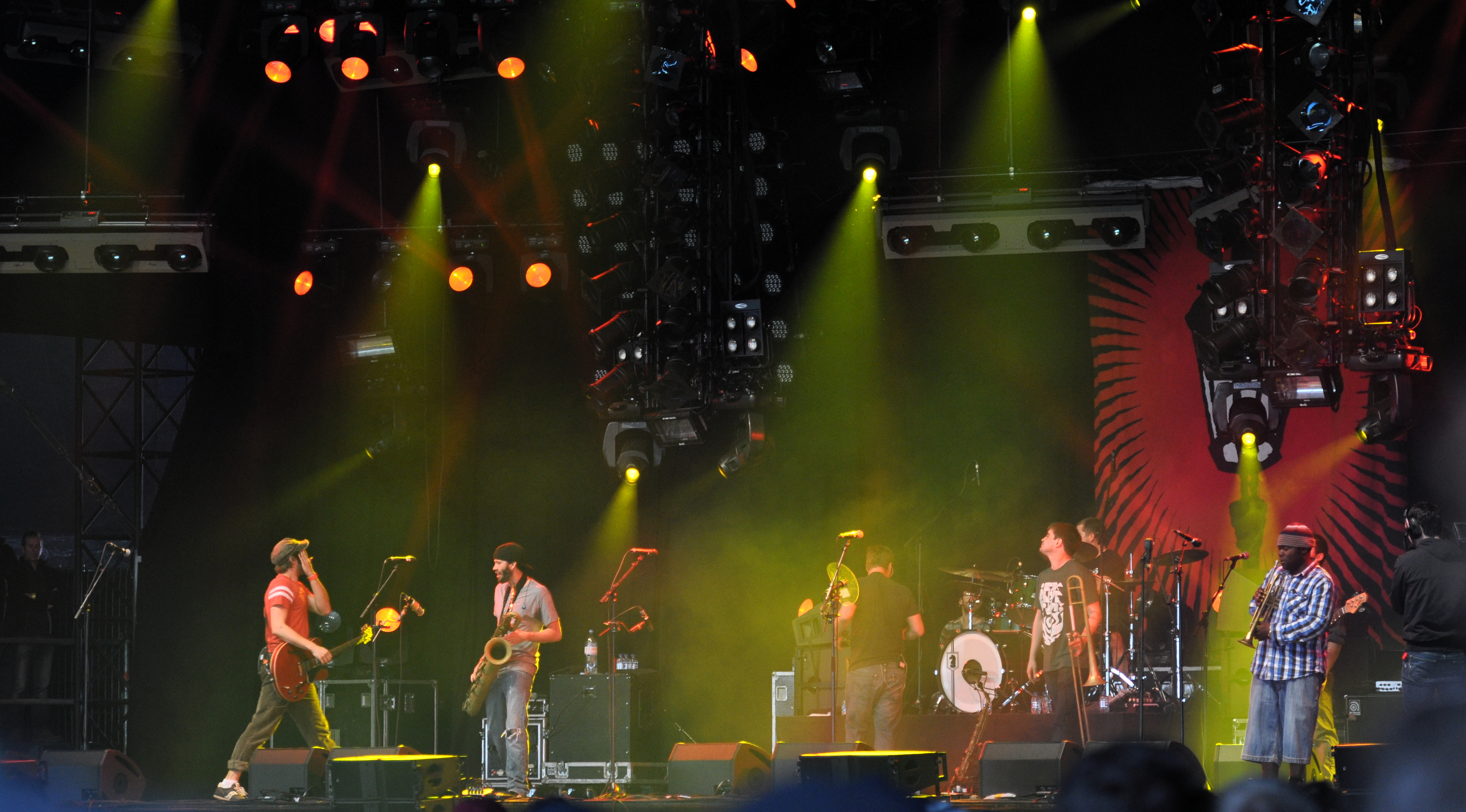
Streetlight Manifesto, Groezrock 2013

In February 2013, Victory Records allegedly withheld all copies of The Hands That Thieve from both Streetlight Manifesto and those that had pre-ordered the album through Streetlight's web store, and barred Streetlight Manifesto from releasing the Toh Kay album. The album was available via Victory Records' website, along with all the major physical retailers. The band called for a boycott of all merchandise and music purchased from Victory Records, be it through online sources such as Amazon.com or through traditional methods of buying physical CDs. They instructed their fans and customers to instead buy merchandise from their website, such as shirts and stickers. Despite the fact that Streetlight allegedly had no physical copies they had been continuously taking pre-orders for the album, which culminated in the band asking customers not to ask for a refund and rather accept an unspecified gift sent instead of the actual album. On May 16 it was announced the mystery gift to be a digipack case containing a blank CD-R with a custom label and 24 page booklet with poems and photos.

On March 1, 2013, Streetlight announced plans to dramatically cut down on touring within the next year:

"We've solidified plans to tour our well-traveled asses off for one last year, until the end of 2013, at which time we will be not necessarily be moving on from the band, but changing our approach to what we do with the majority of our time. More specifically, we will no longer be touring year round, nor will we be touring much at all anymore.

Streetlight is not actually breaking up, and we have no plans to ever do so, really. As of now, we still plan to play festivals, both in the US and overseas, occasional one-off shows here and there and even sporadic short-run tours. Hell, we may even do an extended tour a few years from now, who can say? One thing is certain, though: we will still make music together. We've recently submitted an album (The Hands That Thieve) to the record label we've been under contract with since the beginning, and with that, we are now free of a very contentious, very unhappy relationship (you may have heard, ha!) that has caused us much frustration and anguish over the years. We have no plans to ever sign with another label and we will happily continue to release records, on our own and on our own terms."

They continued by announcing their End of the Beginning Tour, a multiple-leg outing that will last until the end of the year. On May 16, 2014, the band announced its only tour for the year, titled Once More Into the Fray, a series of six shows in the North American Northeast, with support from Dan Potthast and Chris Murray.

On October 20, 2015, after years of poor relations between Streetlight Manifesto and Victory Records, media outlets reported of a $1,000,000 lawsuit filed against Kalnoky. The lawsuit was filed in regard to the band not fulfilling their record deal of four studio albums to be released under Victory Records. The band released five albums under Victory Records however, Victory claims that "... the band agreed not to count this album as one of the four albums under its contract to receive a $10,000 emergency advance." Victory also claims that the album 99 Songs of Revolution: Vol. 1 does not count towards the contract due to it being a covers album. The lawsuit claims the $1,000,000 is to be paid for Streetlight not fulfilling their four-album record deal, as well as damages for copyright infringement relating to the release of their last album, The Hands That Thieve, in which Kalnoky released an acoustic version of the album under his pseudonym Toh Kay titled The Hand That Thieves. Kalnoky took to the band's Twitter account to comment on the removal of the Victory catalog from streaming service Spotify:

"Ironically, @victoryrecords hasn't paid us a cent in royalties in over 2 yrs. More info soon. #irony #douchenuggets"

On October 23 the band uploaded the following statement to their Facebook page:

"THE REPORTS ARE SIMPLY NOT TRUE. Tony Brummel / Victory Records are NOT suing Tomas for $1 Million… ...He's actually suing Tomas for FIVE MILLION DOLLARS."

During the second leg of The Last Good Fight Tour, it was revealed that Dan Ross had returned to the band, now playing alto and tenor saxophone. It was also revealed that Nadav Nirenberg had parted ways with the band and been replaced by Karl Lyden.

=== 2017–present: Independence and The Place Behind the Stars ===
On April 19, 2017, Streetlight Manifesto and Victory Records issued a joint statement that the two parties had reached a settlement under which the band left the record label, and the record label sold the band all master recordings for an undisclosed sum.

On July 27, 2021, Streetlight announced plans to release a sixth studio album "sometime in 2022." On an Instagram post at the start of 2023, they stated they were slowly approaching the end of that endeavor.

On December 16, 2022, Streetlight teased a new song, titled "Mayday", at their performance at the Starland Ballroom in Sayreville, NJ, during their The Calm Before The Chaos Tour.

Trumpet player Matthew Stewart died on September 10, 2023, at the age of 41. Following Stewart's passing, Mike Soprano returned to the band on trumpet and trombone for September shows in San Francisco and Los Angeles. Soprano would later be replaced by Joshua Gawel of brass-funk band Lucky Chops.

On April 25, 2024, Streetlight Manifesto announced information about the new album. The album is close to finished, according to the band. The album is long, but "in length of each song, complexity of parts, variety of melodies, etc." On December 14, at the last show of the year, Tomas stated that the album was going to be pushed back to the first half of 2025.

On April 3, 2025, Streetlight Manifesto released a teaser on their YouTube channel, previewing new material and indicating that further details would be revealed on April 9. On that date, the band officially announced their album, The Place Behind the Stars, would be released on June 24, 2025. On June 16, the band postponed the release of The Place Behind the Stars indefinitely, and announced that three new songs would be debuted on June 24 instead. That day, three songs were released exclusively on YouTube in a pre-release mix, suggesting that they would be slightly tweaked by the time of the album’s actual release.

== Musical influences and style ==
Kalnoky writes the band's songs on an acoustic guitar and then fleshes out the song structure on the computer and hums basic hornlines, after which the rest of the band comes in and adds their parts. He has cited the soundtrack of the film Stand By Me as his biggest musical influence, and stated that he looks to the 1950s and 1960s for inspiration when writing. For Somewhere in the Between he sought to "branch out in different directions", adding "eastern European and gypsy sounds" to give the album "a world influence".

== Members ==
Current members

- Tomas Kalnoky – lead vocals, guitar (2002–present)
- Jim Conti – vocals, tenor saxophone, alto saxophone (2002–present), baritone saxophone (2005–present)
- Chris Thatcher – drums (2003–present)
- Mike Brown – baritone and alto saxophone, backing vocals (2005–present)
- Pete McCullough – bass, backing vocals (2006–present)
- Karl Lyden – trombone, backing vocals (2015–present)
- Dan Ross – baritone saxophone (2002–2005), alto and tenor saxophone (2015–present)
- Joshua Gawel – trumpet (2021, 2023–present)

Former members

- Jamie Egan – trumpet (2002–2005), trombone (2002–2003)
- Josh Ansley – bass (2002–2004)
- Pete Sibilia – tenor saxophone (2002)
- Stuart Karmatz – drums (2002)
- Paul Lowndes – drums (2002–2003)
- Chris Paszik – bass (2004–2006)
- Delano Bonner – trumpet (2005–2007)
- Nadav Nirenberg – trombone, backing vocals (2010–2015)
- Matt Stewart – trumpet, backing vocals (2007–2023); died 2023
- Mike Soprano – trombone, backing vocals (2003–2010), trumpet (2023)

=== Timeline ===
- Note: Mike Soprano played trombone on 99 Songs of Revolution but left the band before the album was released.
- Note: Jamie Egan recorded trumpet on Keasbey Nights in 2006 but was not touring with the band at the time. He and Kalnoky are the only two to appear on both versions of Keasbey Nights.

== Discography ==
Studio albums

- Everything Goes Numb (2003)
- Keasbey Nights (2006)
- Somewhere in the Between (2007)
- 99 Songs of Revolution: Vol. 1 (2010)
- The Hands That Thieve (2013)
- The Place Behind the Stars (TBA)

EPs

- Halfway to the Place Behind the Stars (2026)

== See also ==
- Catch 22
- Gimp
- Bandits of the Acoustic Revolution
