= Victory Records =

American record label

- Parent company: Concord
- Founded: 1989
- Founder: Tony Brummel
- Status: Inactive
- Distributor: Universal Music Group
- Genre: Punk rock; pop-punk; hardcore punk; emo; heavy metal; alternative rock
- Country of origin: U.S.
- Location: Chicago, Illinois
- Official website: victoryrecords.com

Victory Records was a Chicago-based record label founded by Tony Brummel. It operates a music publishing company called "Another Victory, Inc." and is the distributor of several record labels. It has featured many prominent artists including Thursday, Hawthorne Heights, Silverstein, Taking Back Sunday, Bayside, Streetlight Manifesto, and A Day to Remember.

In September 2019, years after acquiring a portion of the label's catalogue, Concord acquired Victory Records and Another Victory for $30 million. Craft Recordings has been managing Victory Record's catalog since Concord acquired the label. Victory has not signed any new bands or released any new records since its acquisition. The label now operates solely as the distributor of the label's alumni, in addition to reissues.

Victory's catalogue includes 4,500 master recordings and 3,500 compositions through its publisher Another Victory.

== History ==
Originally focusing on hardcore punk and post-hardcore bands, Victory later expanded its roster to include emo and pop punk acts.

In early 2002, twenty-five percent of the label was announced to have been sold to MCA Records. However, later that year the deal was terminated by Victory. Victory is currently partnered with and distributed by Sony's RED Distribution.

It was announced in April 2014 that the label would be sponsoring a Victory Records stage for the entirety of the Rockstar Energy Drink Mayhem Festival featuring five of their artists: Emmure, Ill Niño, Wretched, Islander and Erimha. They would continue to sponsor the stage through the eighth annual festival with five of their artists to be announced.

== Another Victory Publishing ==
Another Victory is the sister publishing company to Victory Records, founded in 1997. The company holds a variety of worldwide sub-publishing deals, including those with Mushroom Group, BMG Chrysalis, David Gresham Publishing, CTM Publishing, Clipper's Music, FujiPacific Music INC., FujiPacific Music (S.E. ASIA) LTD., Gulliver Music Publishing, Basement Brazil, and Musou LTD. Music Publishing.

Representing a catalog of over 5,000 songs, Another Victory has landed a multitude of big-name placements for its artists tracks various movies, games and advertisements including "Chain Gang" by Close Your Eyes in NHL 15, "Like LaMotta" by Emmure on Secrets and Lies (U.S. TV series), "All I Want" by A Day To Remember in Crazy Taxi: City Rush, "Die Knowing" by Comeback Kid on The Challenge: Free Agents, and "Let Me Teach You How To Eat" by The Reverend Horton Heat on Ridiculousness (TV series).

== Distributed labels ==
Victory has had distribution deals with Sumerian Records, Rise Records, and Red Cord Records.

In July 2012, it was announced that Victory would become the distribution home for Boston, MA based record label, We Are Triumphant. On May 10, 2013, Victory announced they will be distributing I Scream Records. On September 9, 2014, Famined Records signed a distribution deal with Victory. On February 9, 2017, it was announced that Wilhelm Records will be exclusively distributed through Victory Records.

=== Current ===
- AEI
- Carbon Copy Media
- Desperate Fight Records
- Dragon Well
- Famined Records
- GMM Records
- I Scream Records
- Ironbound Records
- JMB Records
- Jumpstart Records
- Life Sentence Records
- Lobster Records
- Luxor Records
- Pop Up Records
- School Night Records
- Smorgasbord Records
- Torque Records
- Toy Box Records
- Undecided Records
- Wilhelm Records

=== Past ===
- Hand of Hope Records
- Lifeforce Records
- Mutant League Records
- Rise Records
- StandBy Records
- Sumerian Records
- We Are Triumphant Records

== Criticism ==
=== Relations with label ===
==== Negative associations ====
Victory Records has had some negative relations with artists signed to the label. Over the years, multiple bands have cited grievances, conflicts, or filed lawsuits against the record label, while others have stayed with record label for years, or even came back to Victory after releasing albums on different labels.

Former Victory band Thursday has had a conflict with the label, citing issues with royalties. The band also cited an incident involving the Victory Records marketing staff producing whoopee cushions for the promotion of their 2001 album Full Collapse, against their wishes.

In a 2021 podcast interview, Atreyu guitarist Dan Jacobs spoke ill of Victory and the label's founder, saying they had issues with "Tony Brummel and his awful, scummy ways".

On July 12, 2015, Wil Francis of post-hardcore band Aiden posted on their official Facebook that they sold 500,000 albums total through Victory Records and were not paid.

Cory Arford of Carnifex has referred to the label as "faggots" and claimed their practices were highly unprofessional when the band was signed to its roster.

==== Positive associations ====
Despite the controversy, relations between Victory Records and its bands have not been all negative. Close Your Eyes and Ill Niño have mentioned positive relations multiple times in interview. East coast metalcore group Emmure has said specifically "Victory does good business, and if you're a band that is expecting more than what you get, then you're going to feel cheated and robbed."

Thursday stated in the DVD accompanying their compilation album Kill the House Lights that they chose to go to a major label (Island Def Jam in 2002) and after fulfilling their contract, Tony Brummel and Victory Records welcomed Thursday "back with open arms."

=== Hawthorne Heights lawsuit ===
On August 7, 2006, the Victory-signed band Hawthorne Heights announced in a "manifesto" on their website that they were leaving the label and filed a lawsuit accusing Victory of fraudulent accounting practices and for "severely damag[ing] the band's reputation and relationship with their fans." Brummel allegedly issued public statements in the band's name criticizing hip-hop singer Ne-Yo (whose CD In My Own Words was Hawthorne Heights' most prominent competition on the Billboard 200 charts), as well as urging fans and street team members to conceal copies of Ne-Yo's CD in record stores to sabotage his sales. On September 13, 2006, Victory records countersued Hawthorne Heights, accusing the band of breach of contract and libel.

In October 2006, a Chicago judge dismissed two of the three main claims in the band's suit, ruling that the trademark and copyright violation allegations were unfounded. On March 5, 2007, a federal judge in Chicago ruled that Victory Records does not hold exclusive rights for the band's recording services and that the band can record for any label. Specifically, the judge stated: "The agreement contains no exclusivity provision, nor does any of its language appear to prevent [the band] from recording elsewhere during the life of the agreement". The judge later reaffirmed this ruling on May 17, 2007, stating that Hawthorne Heights is still contractually bound to deliver two albums to Victory, but may record albums which are released elsewhere.

In January 2008, Victory filed a lawsuit against Virgin/EMI Records alleging that "Virgin/EMI improperly induced platinum-selling band Hawthorne Heights to repudiate its contract with top independent label Victory Records", including allegations that Virgin/EMI funded the initial phase of Hawthorne Heights' lawsuit against Victory. The suit sought actual damages of $10M and punitive damages of $25M.

=== A Day to Remember lawsuit ===
On December 15, 2011, it was announced that metalcore band A Day to Remember planned on filing a civil action against the label for breach of contract. Legal action was reportedly initiated on May 31 of that year, in which the band claimed that Victory owed them over $75,000 in royalties. Victory Records has said, on their behalf, that the lawsuit is actually about the band's refusal to fulfill their five-album contractual commitment to Victory and their newfound desire to move to a major label.

On October 5, 2013, news outlets reported that A Day to Remember had been given permission to self-release their new album Common Courtesy without any involvement from Victory. The album was released digitally on October 8, 2013. Victory and the band released statements in response to the court ruling.

On November 26, 2016, A Day to Remember won the lawsuit against Victory Records. The band was given $4.02 million and won three of the four issues they were suing Victory for fulfilling the band's contract, controlling the band's publishing, and digital royalty withheld from the band. Victory won the band's master recordings.

=== Design the Skyline criticism ===
Beginning in May 2011, the label was widely criticized for signing groups perceived as inferior to many of the bands they signed in the past. Some bloggers called Design the Skyline "the worst band ever." Although Victory refused to comment on the signing, they continued to promote the band regardless of the criticism. The band however, did comment on their controversy, stating; "We really don't mind. We can honestly see why people give us negative feedback for one, the way we look and the fact that we got signed to a mainly hardcore metal label with just one song; we stick out like a sore thumb. And not to mention how young we are."

=== Streetlight Manifesto lawsuit ===
Ska-punk group Streetlight Manifesto has had numerous conflicts and has a generally poor relationship with Victory Records. The band left the label after their album The Hands That Thieve. In February 2012, Streetlight Manifesto went so far as to request that their fans boycott the band's own music and other items from the Victory record label's online store.

On October 20, 2015, media outlets reported of a $1,000,000 lawsuit filed by Victory Records against lead vocalist Tomas Kalnoky. The lawsuit was filed in regard to the band not fulfilling their record deal of four studio albums to be released under Victory. The band released five albums while on the label, however Victory claims that "... the band agreed not to count this album as one of the four albums under its contract to receive a $10,000 emergency advance." Victory also claims that the band's album 99 Songs of Revolution: Vol. 1 does not count towards the contract due to it being a covers album. The lawsuit claims the $1,000,000 is to be paid for Streetlight not fulfilling their 4 album record deal, as well as damages for copyright infringement relating to the release of their last album The Hands That Thieve in which Tomas Kalnoky released an acoustic version of the album under his pseudonym Toh Kay titled "The Hand That Thieves". The Toh Kay release was officially cancelled, however the release was later made available online.

On April 19, 2017, the band announced on their social media pages that a settlement had been reached with Victory Records. As part of the settlement, Victory Records sold all Streetlight Manifesto master tapes back to the band.
