= All Day =

All Day may refer to:

== Music ==
=== Albums ===
- All Day (Girl Talk album), 2010
- All Day (The Pietasters album), 2007
- All Day: Nike+ Original Run, a mixtape by Aesop Rock
- AllDay Project (EP), by AllDay Project

=== Songs ===
- "All Day" (Cody Simpson song), 2011
- "All Day" (The Pietasters song), 2007
- "All Day" (Kanye West song), 2015, featuring Theophilus London, Allan Kingdom and Paul McCartney
- "All Day", a song by Yemi Alade from the album Mama Africa

== Other uses ==
- Adrian Peterson (born 1985), nicknamed "All Day", American football player

== See also ==
- Allday (disambiguation)
- Alldays (disambiguation)
- All Day Long (disambiguation)
