= Alday =

The coat of arms of the Alday family

Alday is a surname. The Basque noble family Alday, whose coat of arms is shown at right, originated in Getxo.

Notable people with the surname include:

- Gene Alday (1957–2016), American Republican politician from Mississippi
- James Alday (1516–1576?), English navigator, explorer and privateer
- John Alday (fl. 1570), English translator of semi-philosophical and classical works
- Luis Trujillo Alday (born 1993), Mexican professional footballer
- Manuel Alday Marticorena (1917–1976), Spanish footballer who played for Real Madrid
- Paul Alday (c. 1763–1835), French violinist and composer resident in Ireland
- Ricardo Alday Castillo (born 1979), Mexican civil engineer
- David Alday Alvarez (born 1991), Mexican Photographer

== See also ==
- Allday (disambiguation)
