= Factory =

Facility where goods are industrially made, or processed

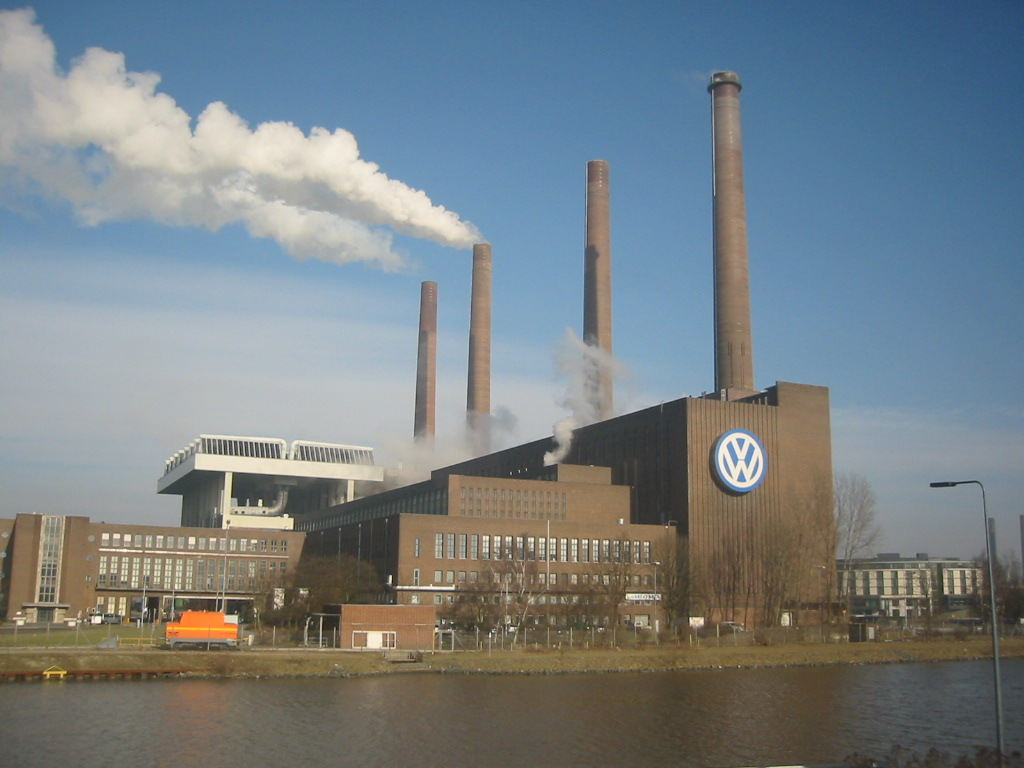
Volkswagen factory in Wolfsburg, Germany

A factory, manufacturing plant or production plant is an industrial facility, often a complex consisting of several buildings filled with machinery, where workers manufacture items or operate machines which process each item into another. They are a critical part of modern economic production, with the majority of the world's goods being created or processed within factories.

Factories arose with the introduction of machinery during the Industrial Revolution, when the capital and space requirements became too great for cottage industry or workshops. Early factories that contained small amounts of machinery, such as one or two spinning mules, and fewer than a dozen workers have been called "glorified workshops".

Most modern factories have large warehouses or warehouse-like facilities that contain heavy equipment used for assembly line production. Large factories tend to be located with access to multiple modes of transportation, some having rail, highway and water loading and unloading facilities. In some countries like Australia, it is common to call a factory building a "Shed".

Factories may either make discrete products or some type of continuously produced material, such as chemicals, pulp and paper, or refined oil products. Factories manufacturing chemicals are often called plants and may have most of their equipment – tanks, pressure vessels, chemical reactors, pumps and piping – outdoors and operated from control rooms. Oil refineries have most of their equipment outdoors.

Discrete products may be final goods, or parts and sub-assemblies which are made into final products elsewhere. Factories may be supplied parts from elsewhere or make them from raw materials. Continuous production industries typically use heat or electricity to transform streams of raw materials into finished products.

The term mill originally referred to the milling of grain, which usually used natural resources such as water or wind power until those were displaced by steam power in the 19th century. Because many processes like spinning and weaving, iron rolling, and paper manufacturing were originally powered by water, the term survives as in steel mill, paper mill, etc.

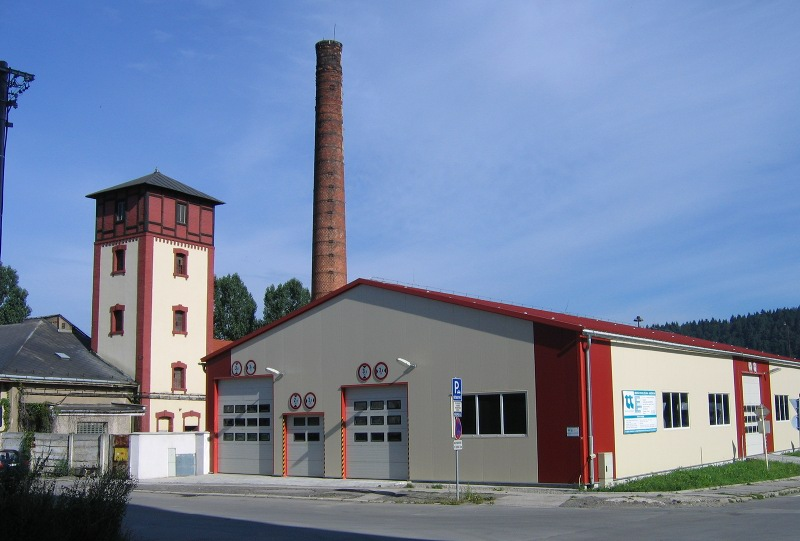
Reconstructed historical factory in Žilina (Slovakia) for production of safety matches. Originally built in 1915 for the business firm Wittenberg and son.

== History ==
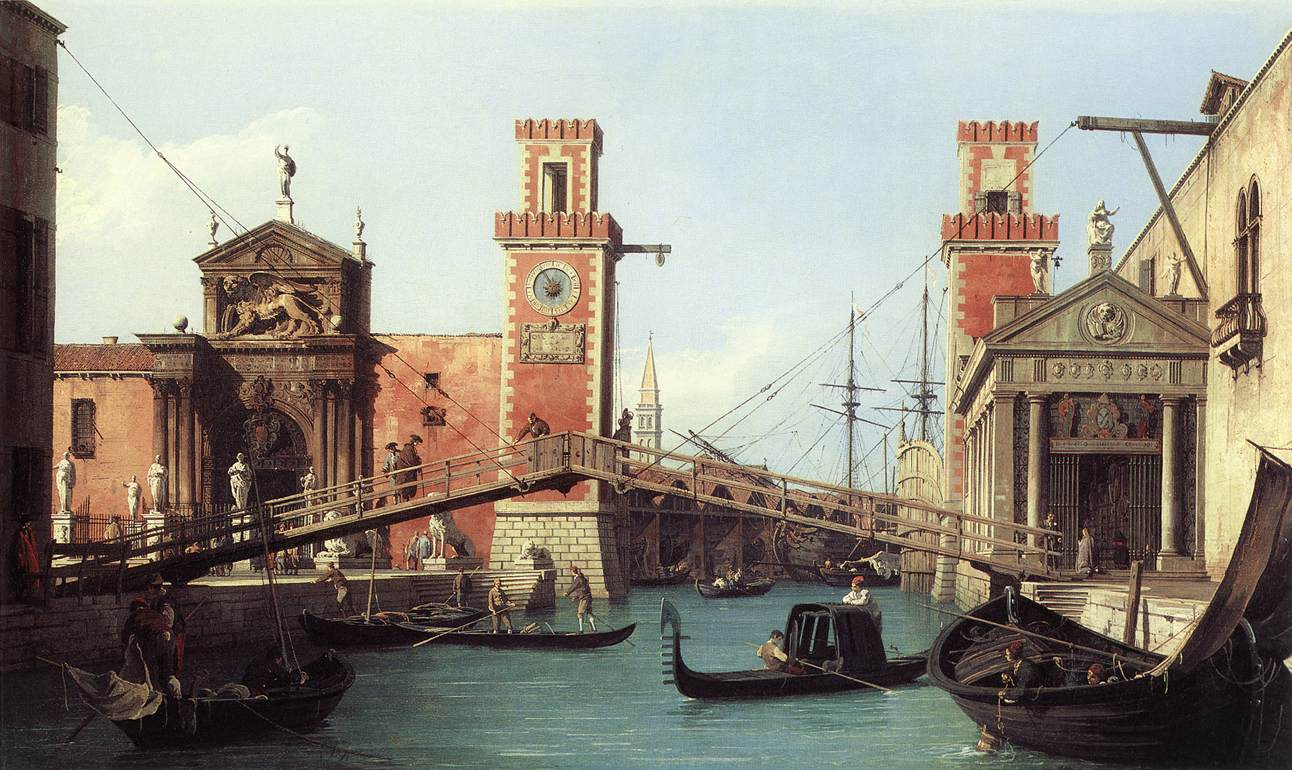
Entrance to the Venetian Arsenal by Canaletto, 1732.

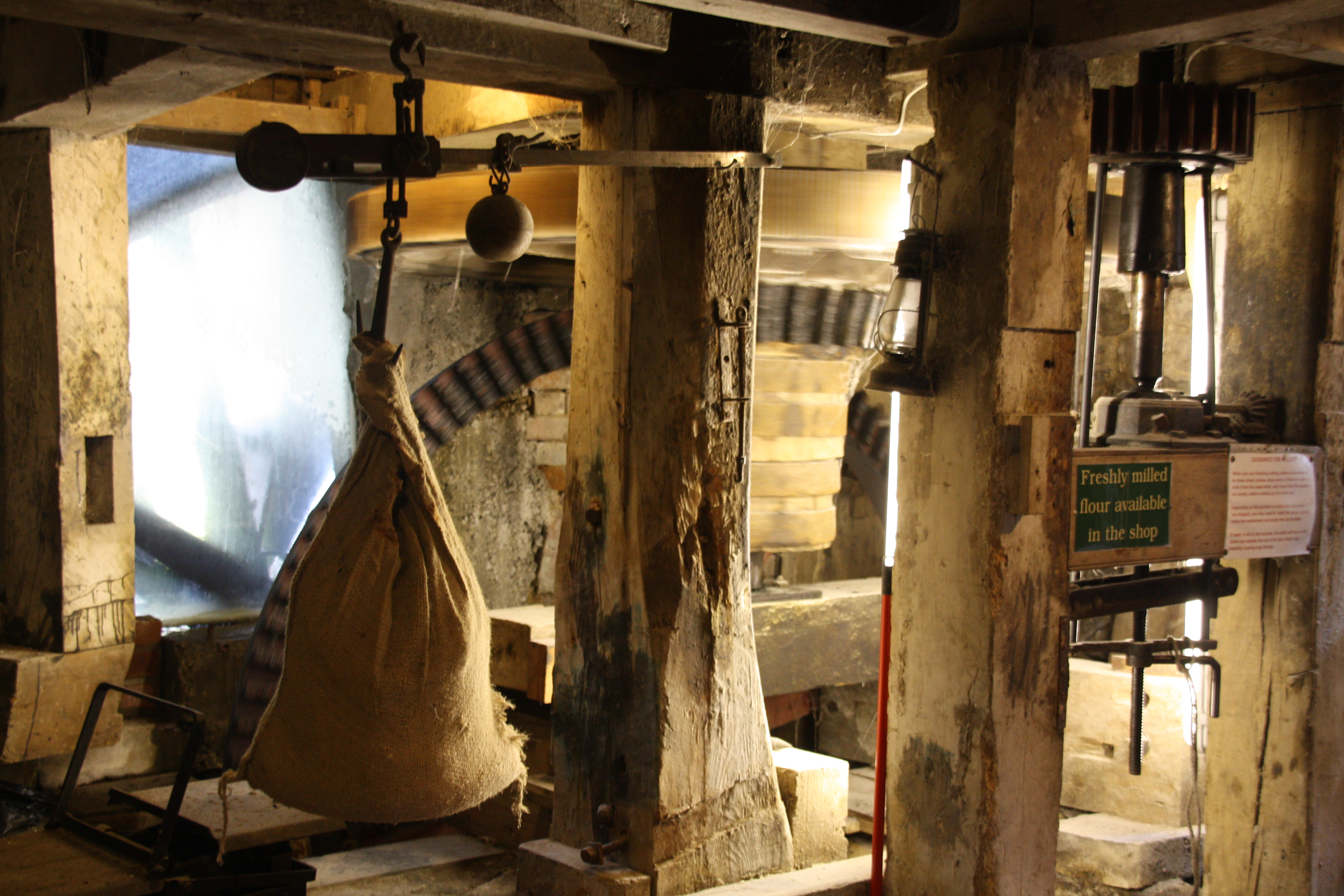
Interior of the Lyme Regis watermill, UK (14th century).

Max Weber considered production during ancient and medieval times as never warranting classification as factories, with methods of production and the contemporary economic situation incomparable to modern or even pre-modern developments of industry. In ancient times, the earliest production limited to the household, developed into a separate endeavor independent to the place of inhabitation with production at that time only beginning to be characteristic of industry, termed as "unfree shop industry", a situation caused especially under the reign of the Egyptian pharaoh, with slave employment and no differentiation of skills within the slave group comparable to modern definitions as division of labour.

According to translations of Demosthenes and Herodotus, Naucratis was a, or the only, factory in the entirety of ancient Egypt. A source of 1983 (Hopkins), states the largest factory production in ancient times was of 120 slaves within fourth century BC Athens. An article within the New York Times article dated 13 October 2011 states:

"In African Cave, Signs of an Ancient Paint Factory" – (John Noble Wilford)

... discovered at Blombos Cave, a cave on the south coast of South Africa where 100,000-year-old tools and ingredients were found with which early modern humans mixed an ochre-based paint.

Although The Cambridge Online Dictionary definition of factory states:

a building or set of buildings where large amounts of goods are made using machines

elsewhere:

... the utilization of machines presupposes social cooperation and the division of labour

— von Mises

The first machine is stated by one source to have been traps used to assist with the capturing of animals, corresponding to the machine as a mechanism operating independently or with very little force by interaction from a human, with a capacity for use repeatedly with operation exactly the same on every occasion of functioning. The wheel was invented c. 3000 BC, the spoked wheel c. 2000 BC. The Iron Age began approximately 1200–1000 BC. However, other sources define machinery as a means of production.

Archaeology provides a date for the earliest city as 5000 BC as Tell Brak (Ur et al. 2006), therefore a date for cooperation and factors of demand, by an increased community size and population to make something like factory level production a conceivable necessity.

Archaeologist Bonnet, unearthed the foundations of numerous workshops in the city of Kerma proving that as early as 2000 BC Kerma was a large urban capital.

The watermill was first made before the end of the third century BC. In the third century BC, Philo of Byzantium describes a water-driven wheel in his technical treatises. Factories producing garum were common in the Roman Empire. The Barbegal aqueduct and mills are an industrial complex from the second century AD found in southern France. By the time of the fourth century AD, there was a water-milling installation with a capacity to grind 28 tons of grain per day, a rate sufficient to meet the needs of 80,000 persons, in the Roman Empire.

The large population increase in medieval Islamic cities, such as Baghdad's 1.5 million population, led to the development of large-scale factory milling installations with higher productivity to feed and support the large growing population. A tenth-century grain-processing factory in the Egyptian town of Bilbays, for example, milled an estimated 300 tons of grain and flour per day. Both watermills and windmills were widely used in the Islamic world at the time.

The Venice Arsenal also provides one of the first examples of a factory in the modern sense of the word. Founded in 1104 in Venice, Republic of Venice, several hundred years before the Industrial Revolution, it mass-produced ships on assembly lines using manufactured parts. The Venice Arsenal apparently produced nearly one ship every day and, at its height, employed 16,000 people.

=== Industrial Revolution ===
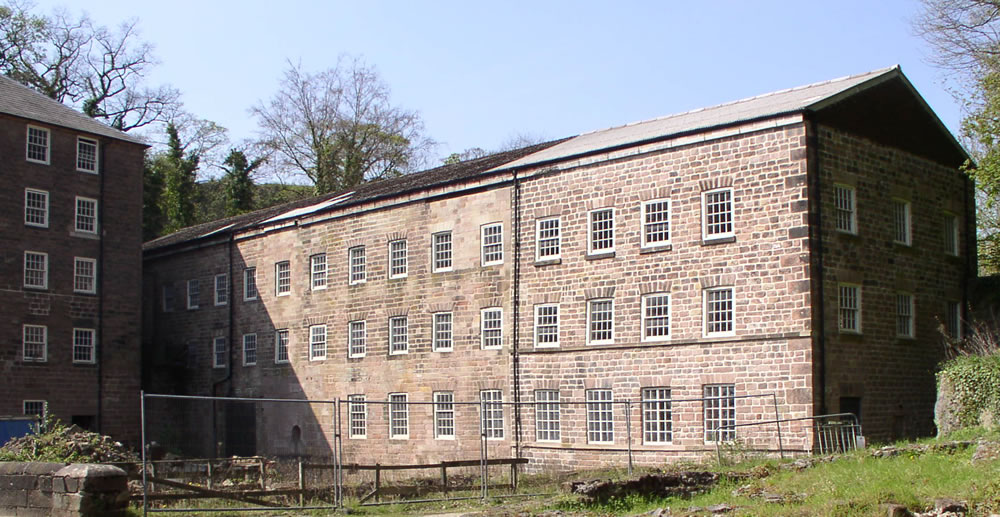
Cromford Mills as it is today.

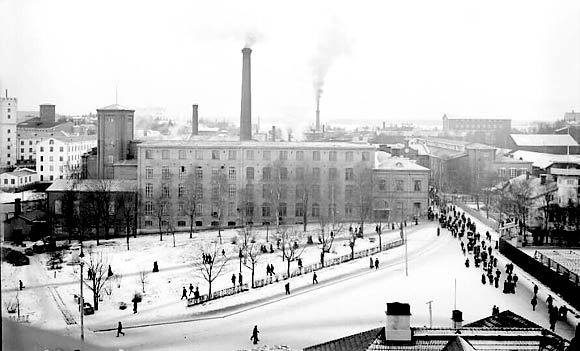
Working day ends at Tampella factory in Tampere, Finland in 1909

One of the earliest factories was John Lombe's water-powered silk mill at Derby, operational by 1721. By 1746, an integrated brass mill was working at Warmley near Bristol. Raw material went in at one end, was smelted into brass and was turned into pans, pins, wire, and other goods. Housing was provided for workers on site. Josiah Wedgwood in Staffordshire and Matthew Boulton at his Soho Manufactory were other prominent early industrialists, who employed the factory system.

The factory system began widespread use somewhat later when cotton spinning was mechanized.

Richard Arkwright is the person credited with inventing the prototype of the modern factory. After he patented his water frame in 1769, he established Cromford Mills in Derbyshire, England, significantly expanding the village of Cromford to accommodate the migrant workers new to the area. The factory system was a new way of organizing workforce made necessary by the development of machines which were too large to house in a worker's cottage. Working hours were as long as they had been for the farmer, that is, from dawn to dusk, six days per week. Overall, this practice essentially reduced skilled and unskilled workers to replaceable commodities. Arkwright's factory was the first successful cotton spinning factory in the world; it showed unequivocally the way ahead for industry and was widely copied.

Between 1770 and 1850 mechanized factories supplanted traditional artisan shops as the predominant form of manufacturing institution, because the larger-scale factories enjoyed a significant technological and supervision advantage over the small artisan shops. The earliest factories (using the factory system) developed in the cotton and wool textiles industry. Later generations of factories included mechanized shoe production and manufacturing of machinery, including machine tools. After this came factories that supplied the railroad industry included rolling mills, foundries and locomotive works, along with agricultural-equipment factories that produced cast-steel plows and reapers. Bicycles were mass-produced beginning in the 1880s.

The Nasmyth, Gaskell and Company's Bridgewater Foundry, which began operation in 1836, was one of the earliest factories to use modern materials handling such as cranes and rail tracks through the buildings for handling heavy items.

Large scale electrification of factories began around 1900 after the development of the AC motor which was able to run at constant speed depending on the number of poles and the current electrical frequency. At first larger motors were added to line shafts, but as soon as small horsepower motors became widely available, factories switched to unit drive. Eliminating line shafts freed factories of layout constraints and allowed factory layout to be more efficient. Electrification enabled sequential automation using relay logic.

=== Assembly line ===
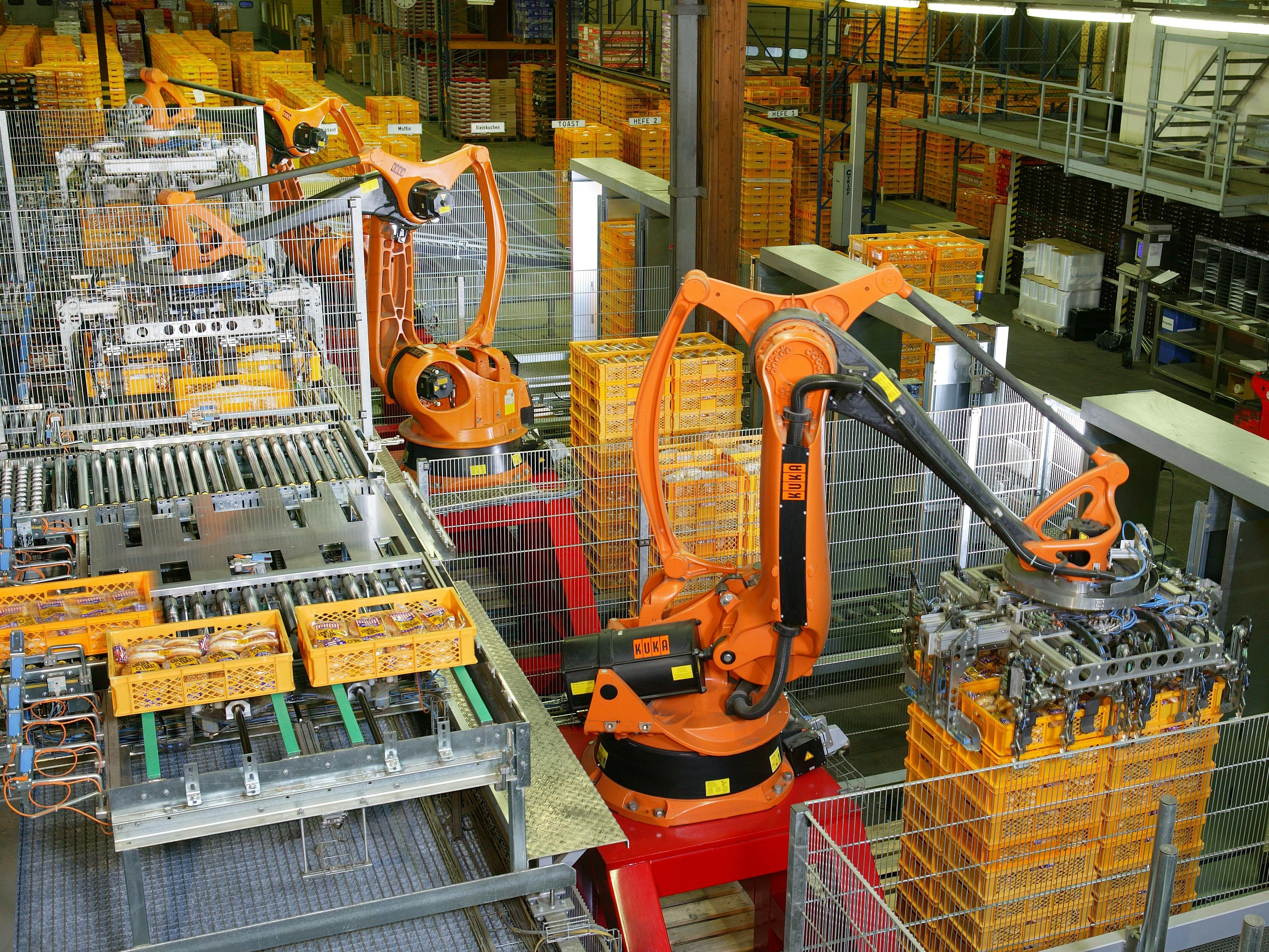
Factory automation with industrial robots for palletizing food products like bread and toast at a bakery in Germany.

Henry Ford further revolutionized the factory concept in the early 20th century, with the innovation of the mass production. Highly specialized laborers situated alongside a series of rolling ramps would build up a product such as (in Ford's case) an automobile. This concept dramatically decreased production costs for virtually all manufactured goods and brought about the age of consumerism.

In the mid - to late 20th century, industrialized countries introduced next-generation factories with two improvements:

1. Advanced statistical methods of quality control, pioneered by the American mathematician William Edwards Deming, whom his home country initially ignored. Quality control turned Japanese factories into world leaders in cost-effectiveness and production quality.
2. Industrial robots on the factory floor, introduced in the late 1970s. These computer-controlled welding arms and grippers could perform simple tasks such as attaching a car door quickly and flawlessly 24 hours a day. This too cut costs and improved speed.

Some speculation as to the future of the factory includes scenarios with rapid prototyping, nanotechnology, and orbital zero-gravity facilities. There is some scepticism about the development of the factories of the future if the robotic industry is not matched by a higher technological level of the people who operate it. According to some authors, the four basic pillars of the factories of the future are strategy, technology, people and habitability, which would take the form of a kind of "laboratory factories", with management models that allow "producing with quality while experimenting to do it better tomorrow".

== Historically significant factories ==
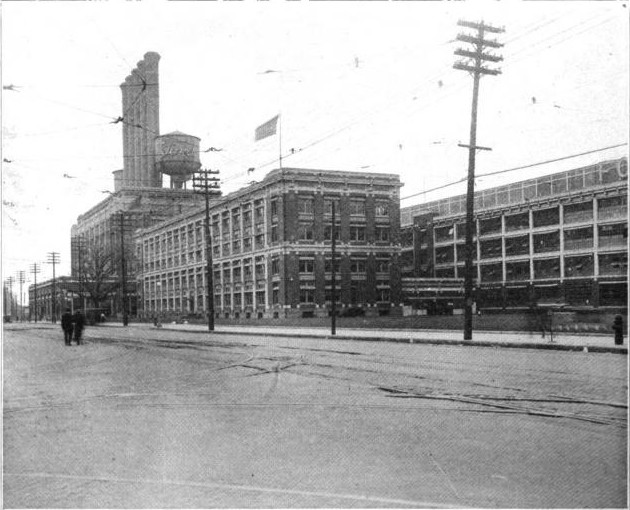
Highland Park Ford plant, c. 1922

- Venetian Arsenal
- Cromford Mills
- Lombe's Mill
- Soho Manufactory
- Portsmouth Block Mills
- Slater Mill Historic Site
- Lowell Mills
- Springfield Armory
- Harpers Ferry Armory
- Nasmyth, Gaskell and Company also called the Bridgewater Foundry
- Baldwin Locomotive Works
- Highland Park Ford Plant
- Ford River Rouge Complex
- Hawthorne Works
- Stalingrad Tractor Plant
- Triangle Shirtwaist Factory
- Amoskeag Manufacturing Company

== Siting the factory ==
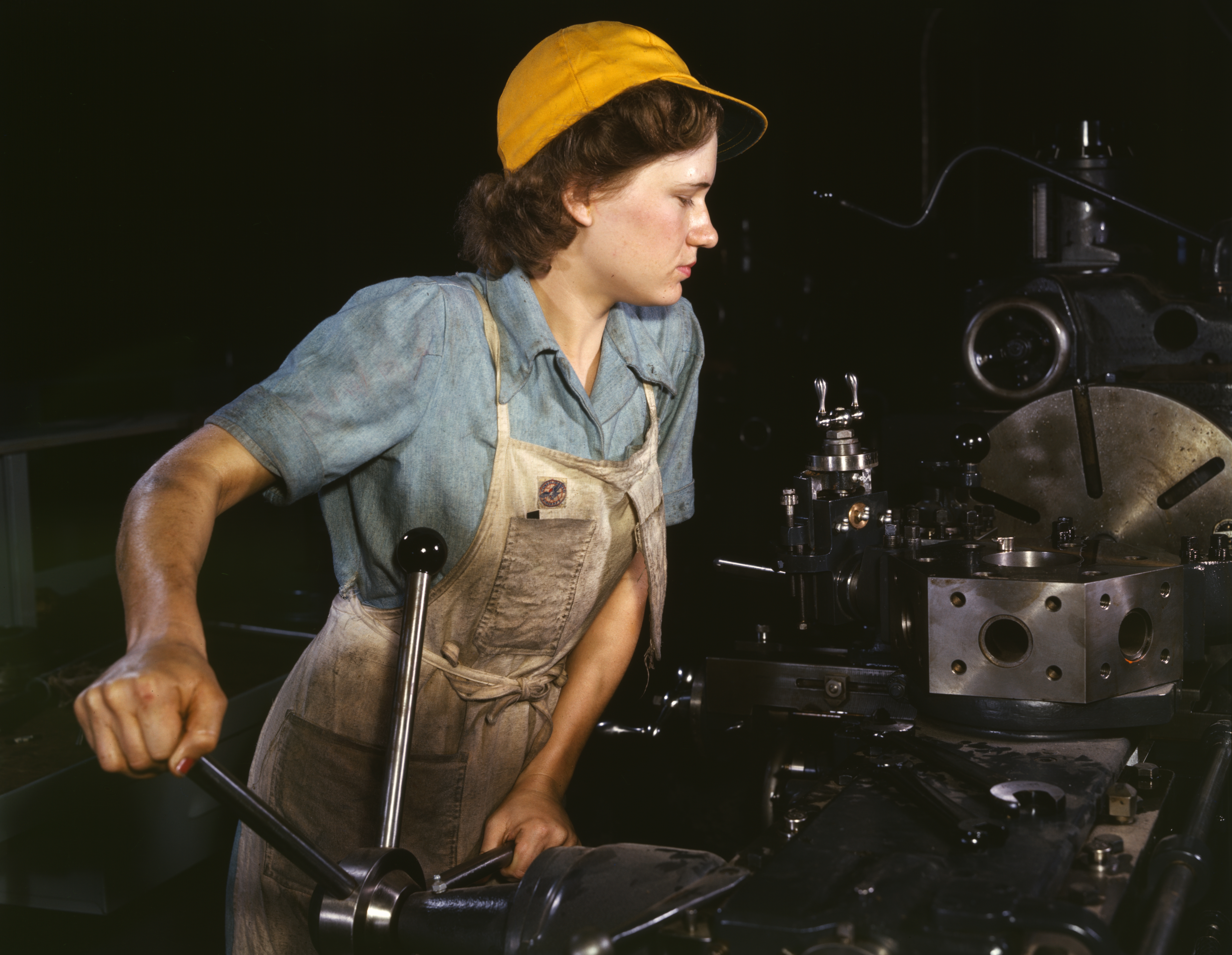
A factory worker in 1942 Fort Worth, Texas, United States.

Before the advent of mass transportation, factories' needs for ever-greater concentrations of labourers meant that they typically grew up in an urban setting or fostered their own urbanization. Industrial slums developed, and reinforced their own development through the interactions between factories, as when one factory's output or waste-product became the raw materials of another factory (preferably nearby). Canals and railways grew as factories spread, each clustering around sources of cheap energy, available materials and/or mass markets. The exception proved the rule: even greenfield factory sites such as Bournville, founded in a rural setting, developed their own housing and profited from convenient communications systems.

Regulation curbed some of the worst excesses of industrialization's factory-based society, labourers of Factory Acts leading the way in Britain. Trams, automobiles and town planning encouraged the separate development of industrial suburbs and residential suburbs, with labourers commuting between them.

Though factories dominated the Industrial Era, the growth in the service sector eventually began to dethrone them: the focus of labour, in general, shifted to central-city office towers or to semi-rural campus-style establishments, and many factories stood deserted in local rust belts.

The next blow to the traditional factories came from globalization. Manufacturing processes (or their logical successors, assembly plants) in the late 20th century re-focussed in many instances on Special Economic Zones in developing countries or on maquiladoras just across the national boundaries of industrialized states. Further re-location to the least industrialized nations appears possible as the benefits of out-sourcing and the lessons of flexible location apply in the future.

== Governing the factory ==
Scientific management developed with factory management principles. Assumptions on the hierarchies of unskilled, semi-skilled and skilled laborers and their supervisors and managers still linger on; however an example of a more contemporary approach to handle design applicable to manufacturing facilities can be found in Socio-Technical Systems (STS).

== Shadow factories ==
In Britain, a shadow factory is one of a number of manufacturing sites built in dispersed locations in times of war to reduce the risk of disruption due to enemy air-raids and often with the dual purpose of increasing manufacturing capacity. In the build-up to World War II Britain built many shadow factories.

Production of the Spitfire at the Supermarine factory at Woolston, Southampton was vulnerable to enemy attack due to it being a high-profile target, and well within range of Luftwaffe bombers and their fighter escort. After several bombing raids caused small amounts of damage, on 26 September 1940 this facility was completely destroyed by a larger attack. The British Government had already established a new factory considerably further to the north at Castle Bromwich specifically for aircraft production, but this was only just producing its first Spitfires. The bombing raids at Southampton prompted further dispersal of Supermarine production around the country using various premises requisitioned by the Ministry of Aircraft Production.

Connected to the Spitfire was production of its equally important Rolls-Royce Merlin engine, Rolls-Royce's main aero engine facility was located at Derby, the need for increased output was met by building new factories in Crewe and Glasgow and using a purpose-built factory of Ford of Britain in Trafford Park Manchester.

== See also ==
- British shadow factories
- Company town
- Factory farm
- Factory system
- Factory (trading post)
- Industrial robot
- Industrial railway
- Industrial Revolution
- List of production topics
- Lockout
- Manufacturing
- Plant layout study
- Software factory
- Powerhouse (instrumental)
- Urban manufacturing
