= Looney Tunes: Back in Action (soundtrack) =

2003 film soundtrack album

Looney Tunes: Back in Action (Original Motion Picture Soundtrack)

Film score by Jerry Goldsmith
- Released: November 18, 2003 (standard); January 8, 2021 (deluxe)
- Recorded: September–October 2003
- Studios: Eastwood Scoring Stage, Warner Bros. Studios, Burbank, California; Todd-AO Scoring Stage, Los Angeles, California
- Genre: Film score
- Length: 37:08 (standard); 123:27 (deluxe)
- Label: Varèse Sarabande
- Producer: Jerry Goldsmith

Jerry Goldsmith chronology
Star Trek: Nemesis (2002)	Looney Tunes: Back in Action (2003)

Looney Tunes: Back in Action (Original Motion Picture Soundtrack) is the film score to the 2003 live-action animated comedy film Looney Tunes: Back in Action directed by Joe Dante starring Brendan Fraser, Jenna Elfman, Steve Martin, Timothy Dalton, Joan Cusack and Heather Locklear. The original score is composed by Jerry Goldsmith in his final film as a composer before his death in July 2004. The score album was released through Varèse Sarabande on November 18, 2003.

== Background ==
Dante's frequent collaborator Jerry Goldsmith scored Looney Tunes: Back in Action. The score was recorded at the Warner Bros. Eastwood Scoring Stage and Todd-AO studios during September–October 2003. It consisted of several short cues that incorporates music from Looney Tunes composed by Carl W. Stalling, excerpts from Raymond Scott's instrumental "Powerhouse" and several classical compositions, which included works from Antonio Vivaldi, Johann Strauss II amongst other composers, all of them being arranged by Cameron Patrick. Due to Goldsmith's failing health, John Debney provided music at the last reel of the film, although Goldsmith remained as the sole composer in the marketing material of the CDs. Debney received an "additional music" in the closing credits and "special thanks" in the soundtrack album credits. Goldsmith died in July 2004, making Looney Tunes: Back in Action his last film he scored in his career.

== Release ==
The soundtrack was released on November 18, 2003, through Varèse Sarabande record label. A deluxe edition was issued on January 8, 2021, featuring several unreleased cues and outtakes of alternate music.

== Reception ==
Christian Clemmensen of Filmtracks wrote "Goldsmith's slapstick material for this film is well developed but not as concise and enjoyable as his own standard of classic parody in The 'Burbs, nor does it have the same electronic creativity. That's likely due, once again, to the speed at which the scenes and moods in Looney Tunes: Back in Action change. It's a very specific sound for a very specific mood, and it should best be left for the marvel of its own construction rather than expectations of a coherent listening experience. With the rejection of Goldsmith's score for the underachieving Timeline earlier in the year, this was his only completed screen credit in 2003, and when he succumbed to his cancer the following summer, Looney Tunes: Back in Action became an arguably unceremonious conclusion to a great career." James Southall of Movie Wave called it "the most energetic and most "fun" score of 2003 without question, a delightful collection of magical moments. It's just so full of excitement and life. Jerry Goldsmith certainly is back in action."

Konstantinos Sotiropoulos of Soundtrack Beat wrote "The globetrotting adventure demanded one of Goldsmith's zaniest scores ever, a sort of indescribable combination of slapstick, action and whimsy that lurches from high-energy symphonic chases to pop-influenced flourishes to Carl Stalling-styled "Mickey Mousing". All of it has Goldsmith's effortlessly melodic touch, with the special brand of left-field inspiration that always accompanied his work for Dante." Heather Phares of AllMusic wrote "A fun and often creative score, Looney Tunes: Back in Action may actually be better than the film for which it was composed." Brian Lowry of Variety wrote "augmented, to the extent it can be, by the always reliable Jerry Goldsmith's score."

== Track listing ==
=== Standard edition ===
All music is composed by Jerry Goldsmith, except where noted.

No.	Title	Length
1.	"Life Story" (composed by Carl W. Stalling; arranged by Cameron Patrick)	0:18
2.	"What's Up?"	1:24
3.	"Another Take"	0:47
4.	"Dead Duck Walking"	3:13
5.	"Out of the Bag"	3:44
6.	"Blue Monkey"	0:54
7.	"In Style"	1:08
8.	"The Bad Guys"	2:55
9.	"Car Trouble"	3:46
10.	"Thin Air" (contains excerpts from "Powerhouse", composed by Raymond Scott)	1:25
11.	"Area 52"	1:29
12.	"Hot Pursuit"	2:25
13.	"We've Got Company"	1:49
14.	"I'll Take That"	1:19
15.	"Paris Street"	1:21
16.	"Free Fall"	1:14
17.	"Tasmanian Devil"	1:08
18.	"Jungle Scene"	1:40
19.	"Pressed Duck"	3:22
20.	"Re-Assembled"	0:51
21.	"Merry Go Round Broke Down" (composed by Cliff Friend and Dave Franklin; arranged by Cameron Patrick)	0:56
Total length:		37:08

=== Deluxe edition ===
All music is composed by Jerry Goldsmith, except where noted.

Disc one
No.	Title	Length
1.	"Looney Tunes Opening (What's Up Doc?) / Rabbit Fire" (composed by Carl W. Stalling; arranged by Cameron Patrick)	1:09
2.	"What's Up?"	1:25
3.	"Another Take"	0:48
4.	"Dead Duck Walking"	3:14
5.	"She Likes You"	0:46
6.	"The Shimmy / Out of the Bag / Save Dad / The Car" (composed by Jerry Goldsmith; additional music composed by Cameron Patrick)	3:53
7.	"Not a Billion"	0:45
8.	"Blue Monkey"	0:58
9.	"Extra Crispy"	0:36
10.	"The Shower / Psycho Parody" (composed by John Debney)	1:15
11.	"In Style"	1:10
12.	"The Bad Guys"	2:57
13.	"Hit Me"	0:30
14.	"Car Trouble / Flying High"	3:46
15.	"Hurry Up"	0:25
16.	"Nice Hair / Burning Tail"	0:55
17.	"A Visit to Walmart / Free Drinks"	0:36
18.	"Wrong Turn Coyote" (composed by Carl W. Stalling with additional music composed and arranged by Cameron Patrick)	0:54
19.	"The Launch" (composed by Cameron Patrick)	0:27
20.	"Thin Air" (contains excerpts from "Powerhouse", composed by Raymond Scott)	1:26
21.	"Area 52 (Take 54)"	1:29
22.	"You're Next"	0:25
23.	"Wacky Marvin in the Jar" (contains excerpts from "Powerhouse", composed by Raymond Scott)	0:49
24.	"Hot Pursuit"	2:26
25.	"We've Got Company / Man & a Woman / I'll Take That"	3:21
26.	"The Painting / The Scream / It Is Spring / Bugs with Mandolin" (contains musical pieces composed by Modest Mussorgsky and Antonio Vivaldi; arranged by Mark McKenzie)	3:20
27.	"The Red Balloon"	0:26
28.	"Paris Street"	1:22
29.	"Free Fall"	1:17
30.	"The Hook / Africa"	0:33
31.	"Tasmanian Devil"	1:09
32.	"Jungle Scene"	1:42
33.	"Pressed Duck"	3:26
34.	"Re-Assembled"	0:51
35.	"Waiting for a Train" (composed by John Debney; contains excerpts from "Powerhouse", composed by Raymond Scott)	2:49
36.	"A New Puppy" (composed by John Debney; contains excerpts from "Powerhouse", composed by Raymond Scott)	3:06
37.	"To the Rescue" (composed by John Debney; contains excerpts from "Powerhouse", composed by Raymond Scott)	4:24
38.	"Heroes" (composed by John Debney)	2:39
39.	"Merry-Go-Round Broke Down (That's All Folks!)" (composed by Cliff Friend and Dave Franklin; arranged by Cameron Patrick)	0:16
40.	"End Title Suite"	5:17
Total length:		69:02

Disc two
No.	Title	Length
1.	"What's Up?"	1:29
2.	"Another Take, #9"	0:53
3.	"Trumpet Wa-Wa"	0:07
4.	"The Shimmy"	0:12
5.	"Out of the Bag"	1:17
6.	"The Car, Part 1"	0:15
7.	"The Car, Part 2"	0:12
8.	"Psycho"	0:37
9.	"Car Trouble"	3:22
10.	"Wrong Turn, Part 1"	1:14
11.	"Wrong Turn, Part 2"	0:25
12.	"Wrong Turn, Part 3"	1:08
13.	"The Launch"	0:30
14.	"The Blue Danube / The Barber of Seville / Can Can" (contains musical pieces composed by Johann Strauss II, Gioachino Rossini, and Jacques Offenbach; arranged by Mark McKenzie)	0:36
15.	"Vivaldi Concerto" (contains musical pieces composed by Antonio Vivaldi; arranged by Mark McKenzie)	0:15
16.	"The Hook"	0:29
17.	"Pressed Duck"	3:39
18.	"Merry-Go-Round Broke Down (That's All Folks!)" (composed by Cliff Friend and Dave Franklin; arranged by Cameron Patrick)	0:23
19.	"Life Story" (composed by Carl Stalling; arranged by Cameron Patrick)	0:19
20.	"What's Up?"	1:25
21.	"Another Take"	0:48
22.	"Dead Duck Walking"	3:14
23.	"Out of the Bag"	3:44
24.	"Blue Monkey"	0:54
25.	"In Style"	1:09
26.	"The Bad Guys"	2:56
27.	"Car Trouble"	3:46
28.	"Thin Air" (contains excerpts from "Powerhouse", composed by Raymond Scott)	1:26
29.	"Area 52"	1:29
30.	"Hot Pursuit"	2:26
31.	"We've Got Company"	1:50
32.	"I'll Take That"	1:22
33.	"Paris Street"	1:21
34.	"Free Fall"	1:15
35.	"Tasmanian Devil"	1:09
36.	"Jungle Scene"	1:40
37.	"Pressed Duck"	3:22
38.	"Re-Assembled"	0:52
39.	"Merry-Go-Round Broke Down (That's All Folks!)"	0:55
Total length:		54:25

== Personnel ==
Credits adapted from liner notes:

- Music composer and producer – Jerry Goldsmith
- Programming – Nick Vidar
- Recording and mixing – Bruce Botnick
- Score Editor – Ken Hall
- Copyist – JoAnn Kane Music Service
- Executive producer – Robert Townson
- Liner notes – Joe Dante
- Executive in charge of music for Warner Bros. – Doug Frank, Gary LeMel
- Musical assistance – Lois Carruth

Orchestra

- Performer – The Hollywood Studio Symphony
- Conductor – Jerry Goldsmith
- Orchestrator – Mark McKenzie
- Contractor – Sandy De Crescent

Instruments

- Accordion – Carl Fortina
- Bass – Arni Egilsson (principal), Bruce Morgenthaler, Christian Kollgaard, Drew D. Dembowski, Edward Meares, Michael Valerio, Neil Stubenhaus, Oscar Hidalgo, Steve Edelman, Susan Ranney
- Bassoon – David Riddles, Kenneth Munday, Michael R. O'Donovan (principal)
- Cello – Antony Cooke, Armen Ksajikian, Cecelia Tsan, Christine Ermacoff, David Low, David Speltz, Dennis Karmazyn (principal), John Walz, Sebastian Toettcher, Steve Richards, Timothy Landauer, Todd Hemmenway, Vanessa B. Freebairn-Smith
- Clarinet – Emily Bernstein, Gary S. Bovyer, James M. Kanter (principal), Joshua Ranz
- Flute – Peter M. Sheridan, Louise M. Ditullio (principal), Sheridon Stokes
- Guitar – Weldon Dean Parks
- Harp – Katie Kirkpatrick
- Horn – Brian D.A. O'Connor, David Duke, James W. Thatcher (principal), Phillip Edward Yao, Richard Todd
- Keyboards – Michael A. Lang
- Oboe – Earle D. Dumler (principal), Lelie Resnick, Phillip Ayling
- Percussion – Alan Estes (principal), Donald J. Williams, Gregory Goodall, Peter Limonick, Steven Schaeffer, Thomas Raney
- Trombone – Andrew Thomas Malloy, Phillip Teele, William Booth (principal)
- Trumpet – Rick Baptist, Malcolm Mc Nab (principal), Warren H. Luening
- Tuba – J. Tommy Johnson
- Viola – Brian Dembow, Cassandra Richburg, Darrin McCann, David F. Walther, Keith Greene, Pamela Goldsmith (principal), Rick Gerding, Roldand Kato, Shanti D. Randall, Shawn Mann, Simon Oswell, Thomas Diener, Victoria Miskolczy
- Violin – Aimee Kreston, Alan Grunfeld, Amy Hershberger, Ana Landauer, Bruce Dukov, Dimitrie Leivici, Eric J. Hosler, Endre Granat (also concertmaster), Eun-Mee Ahn, Franklyn D'Antonio, Irina Voloshina, Katia Popov, Kenneth Yerke, Liane Mautner, Lisa M. Sutton, Marc Sazer, Mark Robertson, Miwako Watanabe, Phillip Levy, Rafael Rishik, Rene M. Mandel (principal 2nd), Richard L. Altenbach, Roberto Cani, Robin Olson, Roger Wilkie, Samuel Formicola, Sara Parkins, Sara Thornblade, Song-A Lee, Sungil Lee, Tamara Hatwan
- Vocals – Sally Stevens

== Awards and nominations ==
Awards	Date of ceremony	Category	Recipient(s)	Result	Ref.
Saturn Awards	May 5, 2004	Best Music	Jerry Goldsmith	Nominated	
