= John Allday =

John Allday may refer to:

- John Alday, 16th-century English translator
- John Allday (Coxswain) fictional character in the 1800 Richard Bolitho novels by Douglas Reeman
