= Library and Museum, Campbeltown =

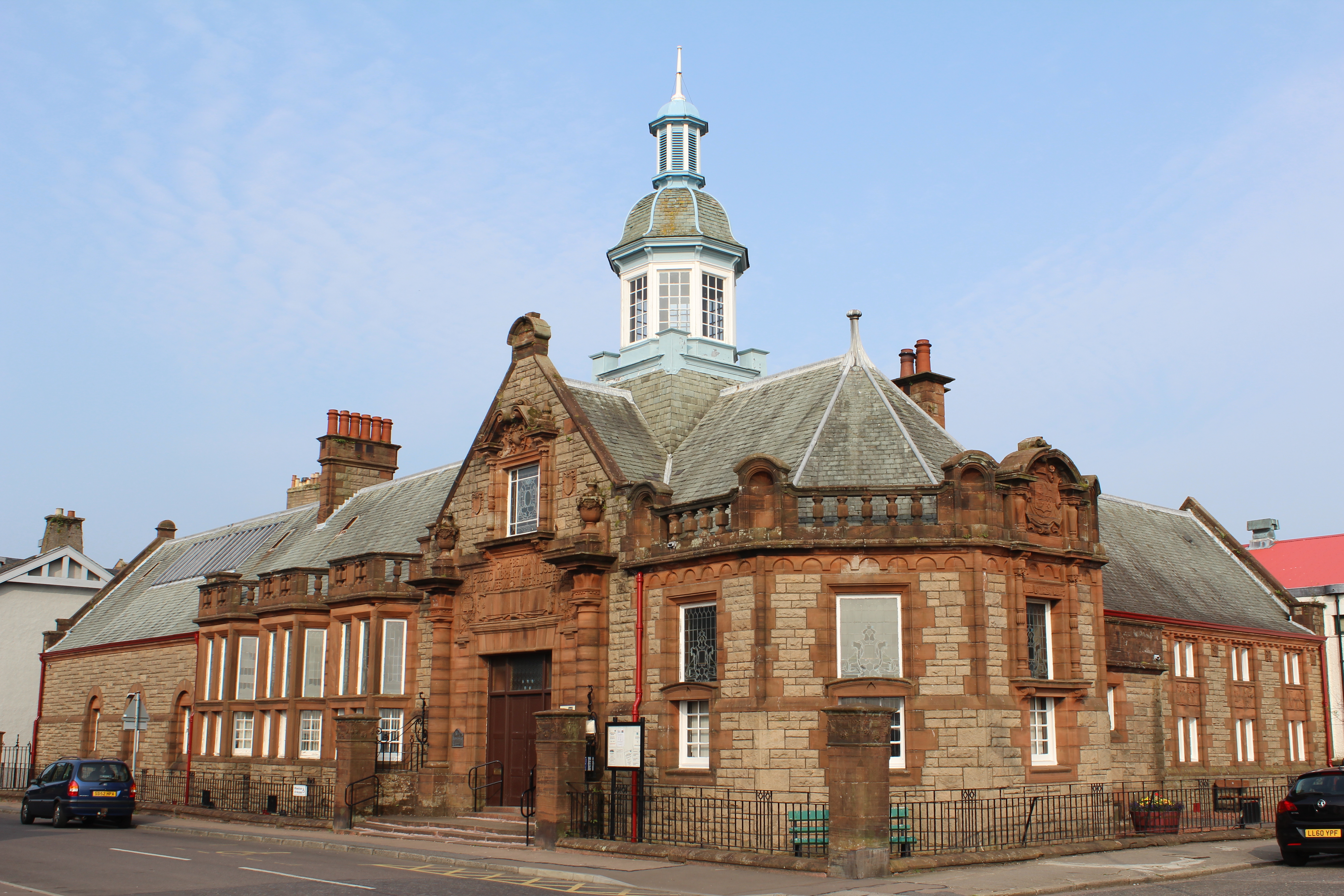
- Library and Museum, Campbeltown
- Interactive map of the Library and Museum, Campbeltown area

General information
- Architectural style: Free Scots Renaissance
- Location: Campbeltown, Argyll and Bute, St John Street, Scotland
- Coordinates: 55°25′25.4″N 5°36′11″W
- Groundbreaking: 25 August 1897
- Opened: 27 January 1899
- Cost: £10,000 (equivalent to £1,111,000 in 2025)

Design and construction
- Architect: John James Burnet
- Designations: Category A listed building

The Library and Museum, Campbeltown is a Category A listed building in Campbeltown, Argyll and Bute.

== History ==
George Campbell, 8th Duke of Argyll laid the foundation stone for the new library on 25 August 1897. Such was the significance of the event that a public holiday was declared in the burgh, and the steamer Culzean Castle brought 1,000 excursionists from Dunoon, Rothesay, Largs, Fairlie and other towns along the coast. The building was designed by the architect John James Burnet

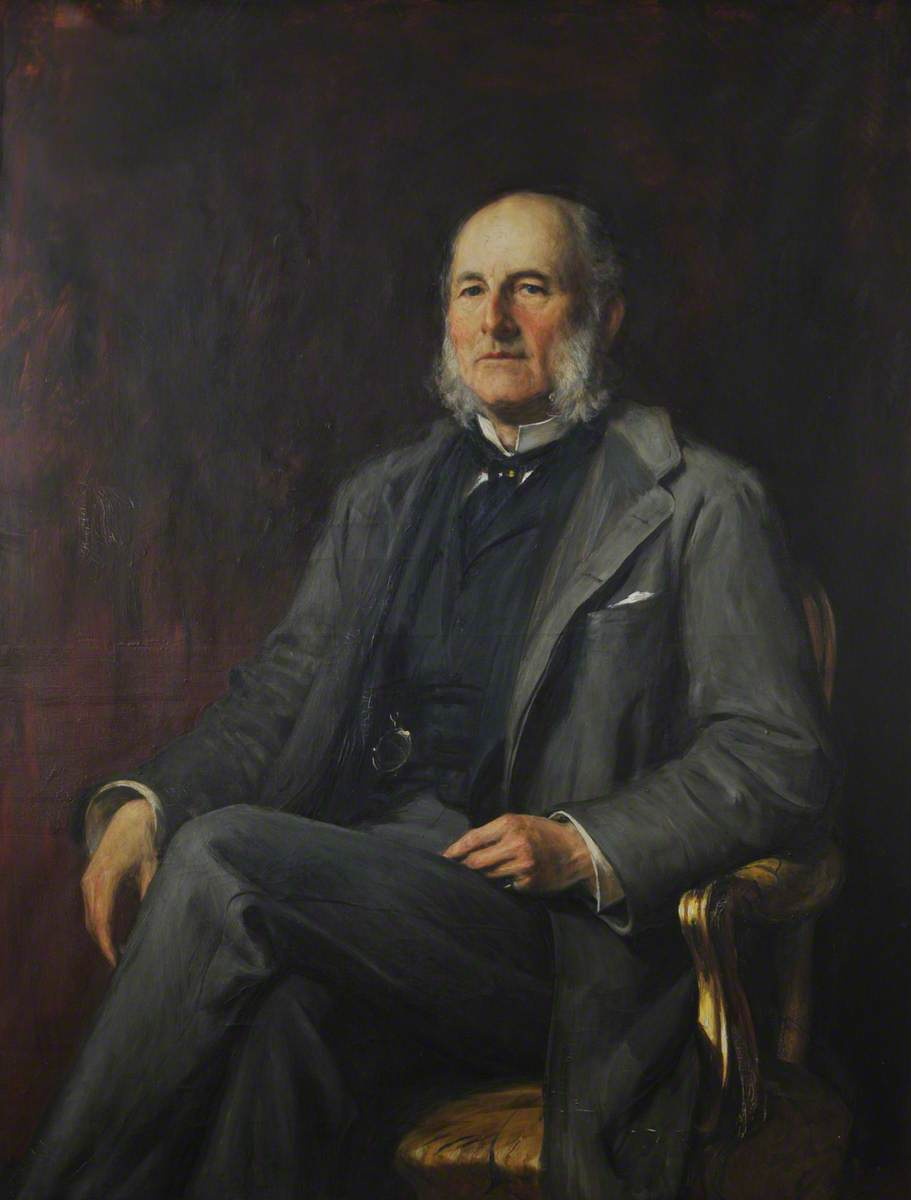
James MacAlister Hall, painted by James Peel

The library was donated by Mr James MacAlister Hall of Tangy and Killean, and in return he was awarded the freedom of the burgh. He also provided an endowment of £3,000 (equivalent to £333,300 in 2025) for the maintenance of the library, payment of salaries and acquisition of books.

It opened on 27 January 1899 and comprises a frontage to the bay of 93 feet (28 m) and on St John Street of 137 feet (42 m). The buildings are divided into a library of 47 feet (14 m) by 24 feet (7.3 m) with a capacity of 10,000 books, a ladies’ reading room of 24 feet (7.3 m) by 18 feet (5.5 m), a general reading room of 37 feet (11 m) by 24 feet (7.3 m),a museum and picture gallery of 48 feet (15 m) by 24 feet (7.3 m), and a news room of 36 feet (11 m) by 19 feet (5.8 m). The building includes a garden for the display of archaeological exhibits not requiring cover. A caretaker’s house with a frontage on Shore Street was also provided. The site occupies 1450 square yards.

In 1991 following a nomination by Kintyre Civic Society the building was floodlit by McKinlay & Blair Ltd with the lantern cupola lit from the inside like a lantern.

In 1993 the museum was the victim of a burglary in which the entire coin collection, guns, five medals and a sword were taken.

== Museum ==
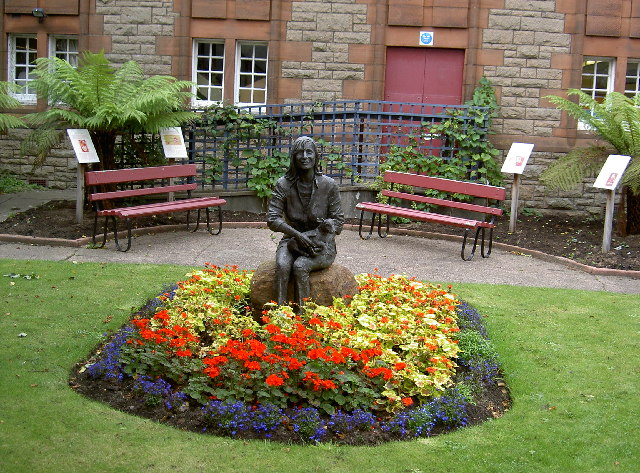
The sculpture by Jane Robbins of Linda McCartney

.

The museum contains a painting of Campbeltown Main Street by local artist Archibald MacKinnon which was done in 1886, and a seascape by William McTaggart. There is also a Bronze Age jet necklace and some urns, a bowl found at Glenramskill House in 1893, and a Cinerery urn found at Dalaruan.

The garden contains a seated life size statue of Linda McCartney holding a lamb (2002) by Jane Robbins installed at a cost of £20,000 (equivalent to £37,100 in 2025). The sculpture is two-thirds life size and was modelled in clay and cast in bronze at Castle Fine Art Foundry in Llanrhaeadr-ym-Mochnant, Wales.
