= Strapped Live! =

Live album by The Pietasters
- Released: April 30, 1996
- Recorded: The Black Cat Club, Washington DC; Captured Live Studios, North Carolina
- Genre: Ska/soul
- Length: 58:16
- Label: Moon Ska Records

The Pietasters chronology
Oolooloo (1995)	Strapped Live! (1996)	Willis (1997)

Professional ratings
Review scores
Source	Rating
Allmusic	4/5 stars

Strapped Live! is a live album by the ska/soul band The Pietasters, recorded at two shows in 1995 and released in 1996 (see 1996 in music).

== Track listing ==
1. "Without You" – 3:02
2. "Tell You Why" – 4:16
3. "Something Better" – 3:57
4. "Must Catch a Train" – 4:39
5. "Fiesta" – 4:00
6. "Girl Take It Easy" – 4:31
7. "Pleasure Bribe" – 3:50
8. "Little Engine" – 3:28
9. "Biblical Sense" – 3:38
10. "Night Owl" – 2:43
11. "Perfect World" – 3:09
12. "Dollar Bill" – 3:50
13. "Freak Show" – 3:02
14. "Movin' On Up" – 3:55
15. "Drinkin' and Drivin'" – 2:48
16. "Factory" – 3:26

== Personnel ==
- Stephen Jackson – vocals
- Tom Goodin – guitar
- Todd Eckhardt – bass guitar
- Rob Steward – drums
- Alan Makranczy – saxophone
- Jeremy Roberts – trombone, backing vocals
- Toby Hansen – trumpet
- Paul T. Ackerman – keyboards
- Caz Gardiner – vocals on track 4
- Shannon Walton – engineer, recorder
