= Willis (album) =

Studio album by The Pietasters
- Released: October 7, 1997
- Recorded: Cherokee Recording Studio; West Beach Recorders
- Genres: Ska; soul
- Length: 45:58
- Label: Hellcat
- Producer: Brett Gurewitz

The Pietasters chronology
Strapped Live! (1996)	Willis (1997)	Awesome Mix Tape vol. 6 (1999)

Willis is an album by the ska/soul band the Pietasters, released in 1997. It was released during the mid- to late-1990s ska explosion, and reached No. 44 on the Heatseekers chart.

The album's first single was "Out All Night". The band supported the album by touring with the Cherry Poppin' Daddies.

== Production ==
The album was produced and engineered by Brett Gurewitz. It contains covers of the Outsiders' "Time Won't Let Me" and Sandy Wynns' "Love's Like Quicksand" (rendered in the track listing as simply "Quicksand").

== Critical reception ==
Professional ratings
Review scores
Source	Rating
AllMusic	4.5/5 stars

The Washington Post wrote that "the Pietasters mix soul and garage-rock just like any frat-party band of the last four decades ... It's a venerable party-rock formula, but rendered fresh by not only the ska-derived musical accents but also the band's solid songwriting and sheer verve." The Hartford Courant thought that "the playing throughout is gloriously sloppy; the tone, pointedly ironic ... This is ska without regrets."

AllMusic wrote that the band returns "to their roots of '60s pop, soul, and Motown R&B, all fueled by a syncopated beat."

== Track listing ==
1. "Crazy Monkey Woman" (Eckhardt/Goodin/Jackson) – 2:38
2. "Out All Night" (Eckhardt/Gurewitz/Linares) – 3:16
3. "Ocean" (Eckhardt/Goodin/Jackson) – 3:38
4. "Fat Sack" (Eckhardt/Goodin/Jackson) – 2:40
5. "Stone Feeling" (Eckhardt/Linares) – 4:06
6. "Higher" (Eckhardt/Goodin/Jackson) – 4:45
7. "Time Won't Let Me" (Tom King/Chet Kelly) – 3:06
8. "Without You" (The Pietasters) – 3:23
9. "Crime" (Eckhardt) – 5:02
10. "Quicksand" (H. Lewis/K. Lewis) – 2:46
11. "Bitter" (Eckhardt/Goodin/Jackson) – 3:53
12. "New Breed" (Jimmy Easter) – 2:59
13. "Moment" (Eckhardt/Goodin/Jackson) – 3:45

== Personnel ==
- Stephen Jackson – vocals
- Tom Goodin – guitar
- Todd Eckhardt – bass guitar
- Rob Steward – drums
- Alan Makranczy – saxophone, backing vocals
- Jeremy Roberts – trombone, backing vocals
- Toby Hansen – trumpet
- DJ Selah – additional vocals on track 4
- Caroline Boutwell – farfisa
- Dave Pinkert – Hammond, B-3, Wurlitzer electric piano
- Andy Kaulkin – piano
- Carlos Linares – additional trumpet on track 7, creative consultant
- Brett Gurewitz – producer, engineer
- Don Cameron – assistant producer
- Paul Dugre – assistant producer
- Joe Breuer – assistant producer
- Paul Naguua – assistant producer
- Maurice Iragorri – assistant producer
- Milton Chan – assistant producer
