= All Day Long =

All Day Long may refer to:

- "All Day Long" (Garth Brooks song), 2018
- All Day Long (Kenny Burrell album), 1957
- "All Day Long" (New Order song), song from the 1986 album Brotherhood
- All Day Long: A Portrait of Britain at Work, 2015 book by Joanna Biggs
