= Oolooloo =

Studio album by The Pietasters
- Released: 1995
- Recorded: Walton Records
- Genre: Ska/soul
- Length: 42:30
- Label: Moon Ska
- Producer: Victor Rice

The Pietasters chronology
The Pietasters (1993)	Oolooloo (1995)	Strapped Live! (1996)

Oolooloo is the second album by the ska/soul band the Pietasters, released in 1995.

It was reissued on vinyl in 2012.

== Critical reception ==
Professional ratings
Review scores
Source	Rating
AllMusic	4/5 stars
Punknews.org	5/5 stars

The Province called the band "lighter of touch and breezier than most of their contemporaries." In 1997, the Albuquerque Journal included Oolooloo at No. 2 on its list of 10 essential ska albums.

== Track listing ==
1. "Something Better" (Raecke/Goodin) – 3:31
2. "Freak Show" (Eckhardt/Goodin/Jackson) – 3:00
3. "Tell You Why" (Goodin/Jackson/Roberts/Watt) – 4:05
4. "Maggie Mae" (Goodin/Raecke/Eckhardt) – 3:01
5. "It's the Same Old Song" (Holland/Dozier/Holland) – 3:02
6. "Pleasure Bribe" (Eckhardt/Jackson/Goodin) – 3:52
7. "Girl Take It Easy" (Goodin/Linares) – 5:03
8. "Can I Change My Mind" (Tyrone Davis, arrg: Goodin/Jackson) – 6:00
9. "Night Before" (Goodin/Jackson) – 3:21
10. "Biblical Sense" (Goodin) – 3:30
11. "Movin' on Up" (Eckhardt/Goodin/Linares/Roberts) – 4:05

== Personnel ==
- Stephen Jackson – vocals
- Tom Goodin – guitar
- Chris Watt – bass guitar
- Todd Eckhardt – guitar, bass guitar, backing vocals
- Rob Steward – drums
- Eric Raecke – saxophone
- Alan Makranczy – saxophone
- Jeremy Roberts – trombone, backing vocals
- Carlos Linares – trumpet
- Toby Hansen – trumpet
- Paul T. Ackerman – keyboards
- Vic Rice – producer, mixing
- Shannon Walton – engineer
