= Tal Bayer =

American rugby coach and musician

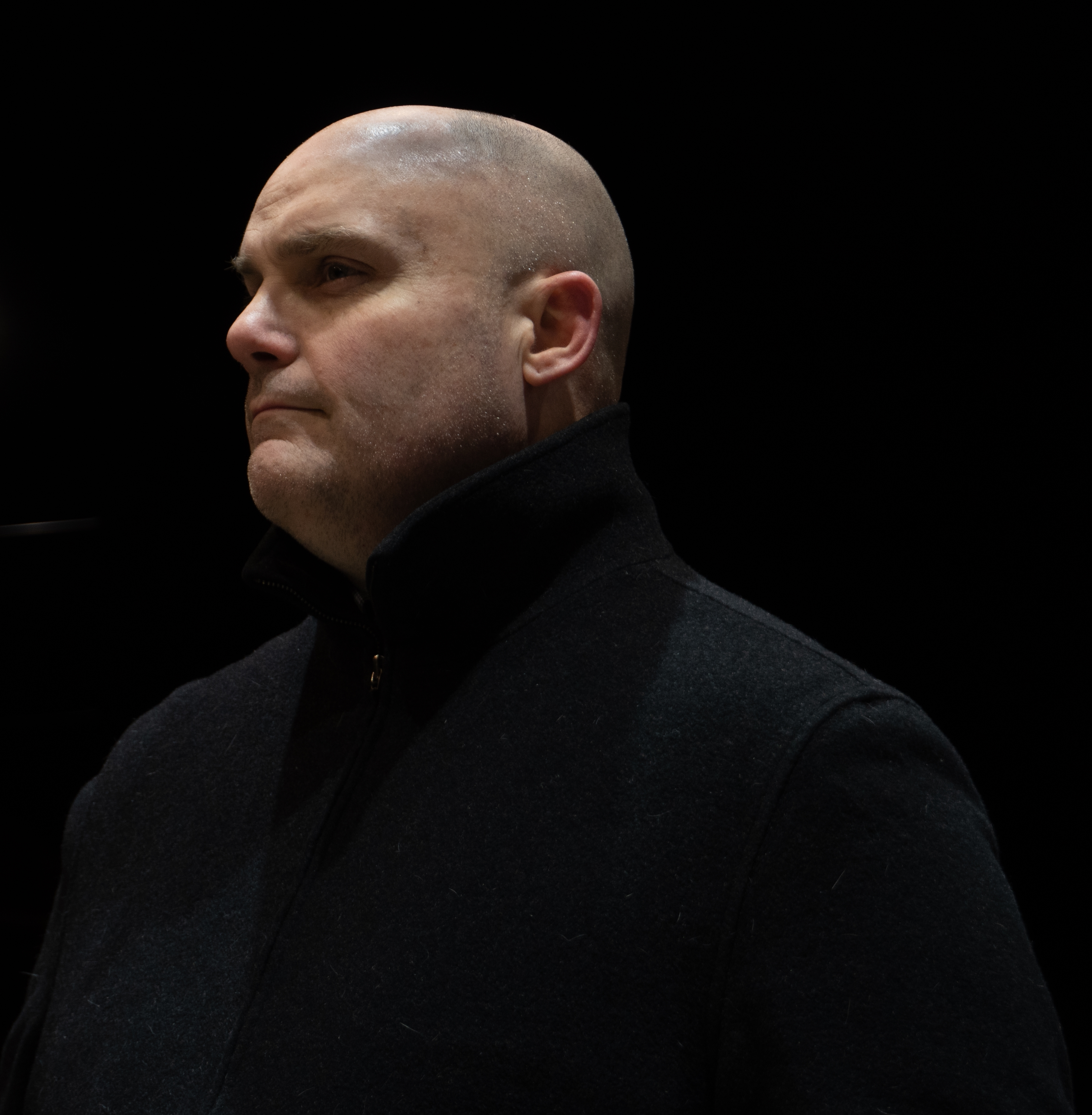
- Born: October 23, 1970 (age 55); Charleston, South Carolina, U.S.
- Education: Radford University
- Occupations: Musician; singer; songwriter; coach; educator
- Musical career
- Genres: Ska; Ska Punk
- Instrument: Vocals
- Formerly of: The Pietasters

Talmage "Tal" Hugh-Ross Bayer (born October 23, 1970), is an American musician, educator, and retired rugby coach. He is best known for being a founding member of the Ska band The Pietasters, and the head coach of the Hyde/Perry Street Prep rugby team, the first all-black rugby team in the U.S.

== Early life ==
Bayer was born October 23, 1970, in Charleston, South Carolina. His father was a colonel in the Air Force, and the family moved around frequently. Bayer attended numerous colleges before graduating from Radford University with a degree in Human Resources management.

== Musical career ==
While in college at Radford, Bayer met fellow college students Stephen Jackson, Chris Watt, Ben Gauslin, and Tom Goodin, who attended nearby Virginia Tech. This group had their own punk band The Slugs, but after moving in with them Bayer convinced them to convert to a ska band instead, with him as the frontman/lead singer.

Soon after this the band was forced to change their name due to another existing band who also went by The Slugs. The replacement name The Pietasters was chosen, due to some of the members portly statures. The band began to play across the East Coast during the Third wave of Ska, and recorded their first Album “The Pietasters”, with Bayer contributing songwriting and lead vocals.

In the summer of 1993 the band set out on their first international tour where they traveled the U.S. and Canada in an old school bus purchased for $900. After this tour, Bayer, along with most of the original members, left the band. He then moved to Atlanta, Georgia, and ended up founding the Atlanta Punk band The Rent Boys while there.

== Rugby ==
Bayer began playing rugby in high school while in Alexandria, Virginia, for Weston RFC, and then proceeded to play in College for Radford University. Initially after graduating from college, Bayer worked in the finance industry in Atlanta, where he played for the Atlanta Renegades. He then moved to Washington DC to help with the opening of the Hyde charter school (where he continued to play Rugby with the Washington Rugby Football club).

While in Atlanta he had begun coaching inner city youth, and soon after the opening of the Hyde Charter school in 1999, Bayer founded a school rugby team, which had its inaugural season in 2000. This team ended up finding success in the world of American rugby, going on to win the 2012 national high school rugby championship. Additionally, many athletes from the team went on to play in College, play for the U.S. national team, and play internationally. This same program would also attract interest from the film world, having a feature length documentary about it, and scripts for a dramatic version of the team's story shopped around. During this time Bayer also helped to start the Rugby program at nearby Model Secondary school for the deaf.

After leaving Perry Street Prep (formerly Hyde Charter school) in 2013, Bayer went on to coach rugby at the collegiate level with Wheeling Jesuit University. Following this he then was head Rugby coach at New England College. Besides Bayer’s school-based rugby experiences, he has also been a coach of the U19 American national team, as well as numerous club and camp experiences. He also serves on the board of the Washington DC Youth Rugby foundation.

== Career in education ==
Initially after graduating from college, Bayer worked in the finance industry in Atlanta, before moving to Washington DC to help with the opening of the Hyde charter school. While there he served as the dean of students for grades K-8, athletic director, and head rugby coach

After leaving his position as coach of the New England College Rugby Team, Bayer proceeded to help open and become the head of school of Kreiva Academy, a charter school in Manchester, New Hampshire serving grades 6-12.

Currently he serves as the State Charter School Administrator in the New Hampshire Department of Education.
