= History of Woolston, Southampton =

History of Woolston, suburb of Southampton, Hampshire.

== Early history ==
Woolston is believed to originate from Olafs tun and it remained part of the Itchen Urban District Council, a fortified tun on the East bank of the River Itchen established by the Viking leader Olaf I of Norway in the 10th century. The small hill in the area surrounding modern day Defender Road conveniently overlooks the Saxon port of Hamwic. This area would thus have been a good strategic location for the Vikings in 994 AD, when they were known to have camped in the Itchen area.

== Toponymy ==
In the Domesday Book of 1086, the area is recorded as Olvestune. Medieval trade in Southampton included the export of wool produced across a large part of Southern England. The "Wool House" still survives in Southampton and was very accessible via the crossing of the River Itchen, Hampshire from Itchen Ferry village. With the next available crossing of the River Itchen, Hampshire several miles upstream at Mansbridge, the area now known as Woolston is certain to have received consignments of wool to be ferried across the River Itchen, Hampshire by the inhabitants of Itchen Ferry village. The evolution of Olvestune into "Woolston" is a result of that trade.

== Occupants ==
In 1424, Richard Inkpen conveyed an estate on the east bank of the River Itchen, Hampshire to his daughter Alice, wife of Richard Chamberlayne. At least part of that estate was to return to the Chamberlayne name in the late 18th century.

In 1536, Niccolo de Marini de Egra, a Genoese merchant, is recorded as purchasing the Manor of Woolston.

In 1631, Sir George Rivers conveyed 340 acres (1.4 km^{2}) of land and the rights to the passage over the river Itchen to Nathaniel Mills. This transaction appears to have been Woolston Manor. The rights to the passage over the River Itchen, was owned by the Lords of the Manors of Southampton and Woolston, but those rights were exercised by the fishermen of Itchen Ferry village who paid for that privilege in cash, providing a useful income for the Lord of the Manor.

In 1781, William Chamberlayne inherited the estates owned by Thomas Dummer, of Woolston House. In 1802 his son, William Chamberlayne (MP) established the Weston Grove Estate on land neighbouring Woolston.

The Dummer/Chamberlayne estate covered a large area, extending as far as Netley and including Netley Abbey. On 3 January 1856, Thomas Chamberlayne sold land that was used to develop the Royal Victoria Military Hospital. Workers from Woolston were used to help with its construction. The hospital was subsequently a significant customer for the traders of Woolston.

== Industry ==
An Ordnance Survey map (NC/03/17894), shows that a shipbuilding yard existed in Woolston in 1870.

In 1876, Thomas Ridley Oswald, a shipbuilder from Sunderland, closed his yard on the River Wear due to financial difficulties and opened a new shipyard on the banks of the River Itchen, Hampshire at Woolston. In 1878 he formed a partnership with John Henry Mordaunt of Warwick, changing the name of the business to Oswald Mordaunt and Company.

Between 1876 and 1889 the yard launched over 100 ships. Despite that success, the Woolston yard also experienced some financial difficulties. In 1881 an official receiver was appointed to manage the company. Shipbuilding continued at the yard for a few years, but in 1889, Oswald Mordaunt and Company sought a new yard in South Wales and closed the yard in Woolston.

William Becket-Hill, who had been managing the yard as official receiver since 1886 soon formed a new consortium and shipbuilding resumed as the Southampton Naval Works under the management of J. Harvard Biles, a naval architect from the Clyde subsequently to become the first Professor of Naval Architecture at the University of Glasgow. The Southampton Naval Works built eighteen ships, but that business also experienced financial problems and went into receivership in 1893.

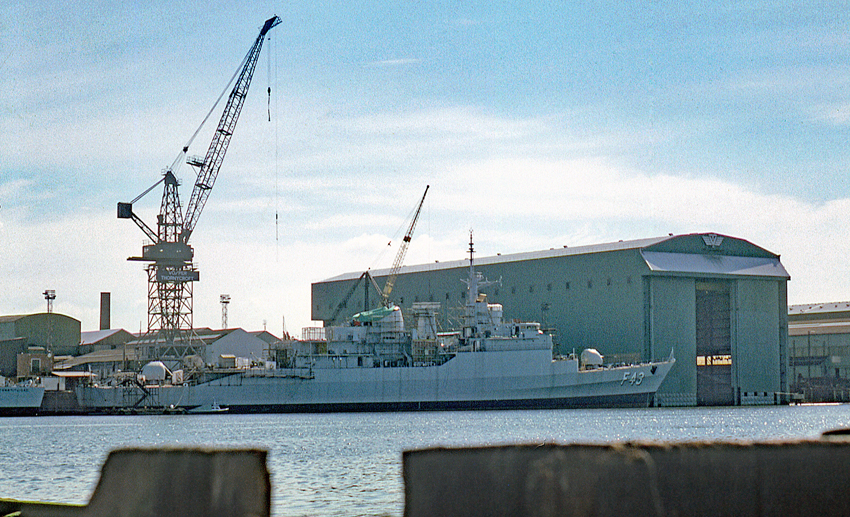
Vosper Thorneycroft, Woolston, 1977, with Brazilian frigate F43 Liberal

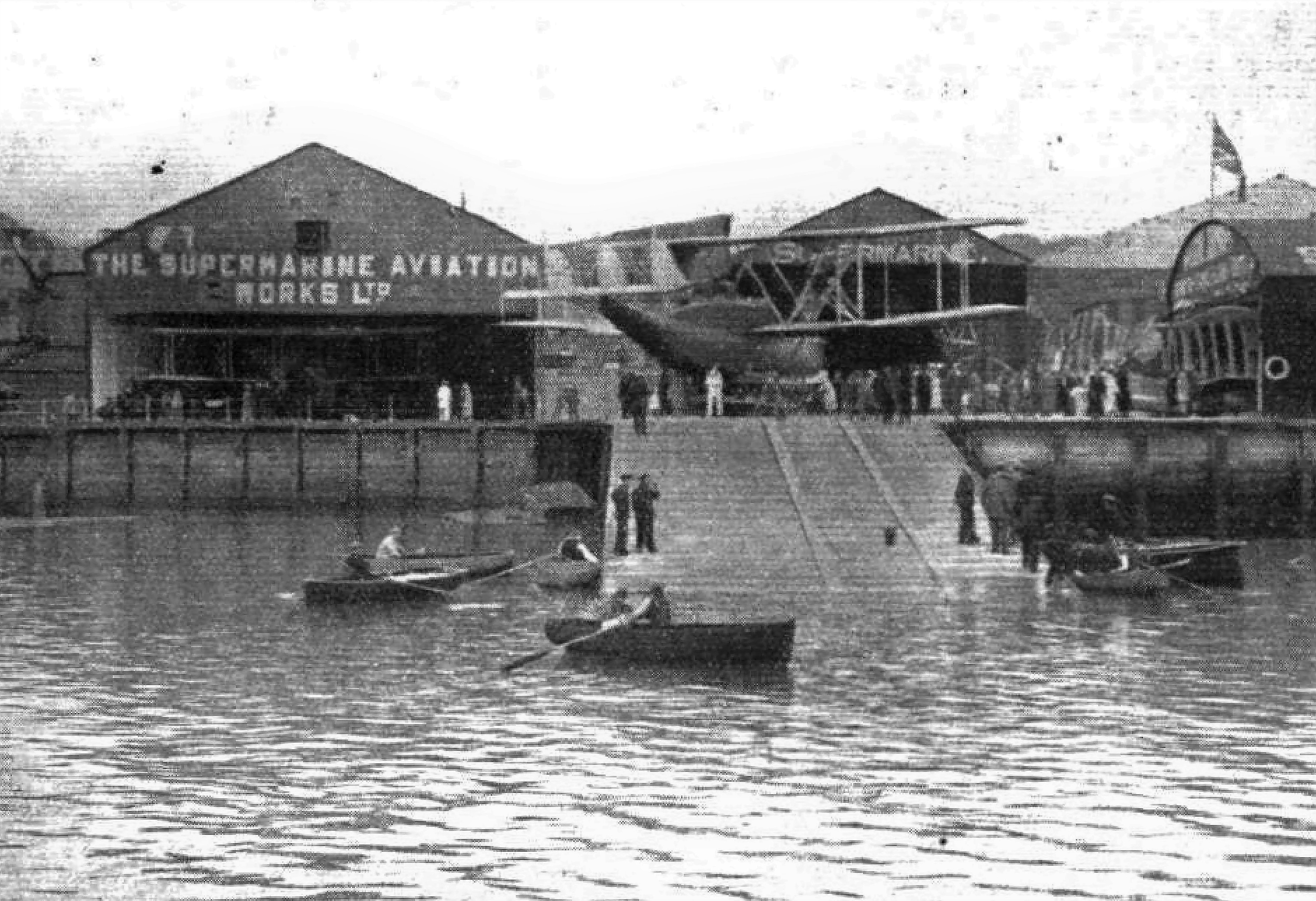
Supermarine Aviation Ltd, Woolston, 1924

The yard was then idle until the yacht building firm, J.G. Fay and Co of Northam, Southampton, expanded their business and took over the Woolston yard in 1897. That venture was also financially unsuccessful, so J.G. Fay and Co sought joint ownership with Mordey Carney and Co. in 1899.

In June 1904 John I. Thornycroft & Company relocated to Woolston from Chiswick where it acquired the shipyard from Mordey Carney and Co. In the late 1920s the yard was expanded by reclaiming land from the sea and in the process the hulls of a Cowes Ketch and a lighter were buried within the reclaimed land.

In 1966 John I. Thornycroft & Company merged with Vosper & Co. to form Vosper Thornycroft. The various shipbuilding companies on this Victoria Road site were thus the major employer in Woolston until 31 March 2004 when Vosper Thorneycroft vacated the site having relocated its operations to Portsmouth.

The other major employer in Woolston, from 1913 to 1960, was Supermarine. This company built seaplanes on its Hazel Road site that were ultimately successful in the Schneider Trophy. Those seaplanes were further developed by R. J. Mitchell to create the Supermarine Spitfire. Alongside its simpler and more numerous counterpart, the Hawker Hurricane, the Spitfire played an important part in World War II and the Battle of Britain. This made Woolston an important target for the Luftwaffe.

The Sopwith Aviation Company opened a small factory in Woolston in 1914, building seaplanes for the Admiralty during World War I.

The Royal Navy also had a large building situated between Archery Road and the waterfront which they used as stores. Originally built in 1917 by the Ministry of Munitions as Rolling Mills for the production of brass strip for shell cases, this building is often thought of and referred to as being within Woolston but it was actually in the neighbouring district of Weston. It was built immediately behind Weston Grove House on land that was originally part of the Weston Grove estate.

Situated slightly to the north of Woolston railway station was a small goods yard, accessible from Bridge Road. This yard was a busy place until it closed in November 1967.

The Hazel Road area of modern Woolston still has some industrial activity, including Siva Group and GriffonHoverwork.

== Wartime ==
With the Supermarine factory making Spitfires, and a major shipbuilding yard situated a short distance downstream, Woolston attracted a lot of attention from the Luftwaffe during World War II. This bombing did significant damage in Woolston and completely destroyed the Supermarine factory and the neighbouring Itchen Ferry village on 26 September 1940, but it did not stop production of the Spitfire which had been safely dispersed around the country.

In 1943, the Admiralty requisitioned the bombed-out remains of the Supermarine factory to provide a base for the planning of PLUTO, an undersea pipeline which supplied the invasion forces after D-Day. This base was known as HMS Abatos.

On 17 August 1943 military restrictions were introduced to facilitate a "military exercise" prior to the invasion of Europe and D-Day in 1944. The southern parts of Woolston were explicitly listed by the Chief Constable (6 August 1943) as one of the areas that would be affected by the exercise. The exercise named Harlequin tested the port of Southampton's capacity for embarking troops and equipment. For the next 9 months Woolston saw a great deal of military activity. It became part of the huge military camp that was established in Hampshire, known as Area C, specifically part of embarkation area C5.

The ruins around Itchen Ferry village were used for training troops that would be fighting in similar conditions on mainland Europe.

Woolston was also situated within Regulated Area (No 2) established 31 March 1944, which placed restrictions on the movement of people in the final build-up to D-Day.

== Other history ==
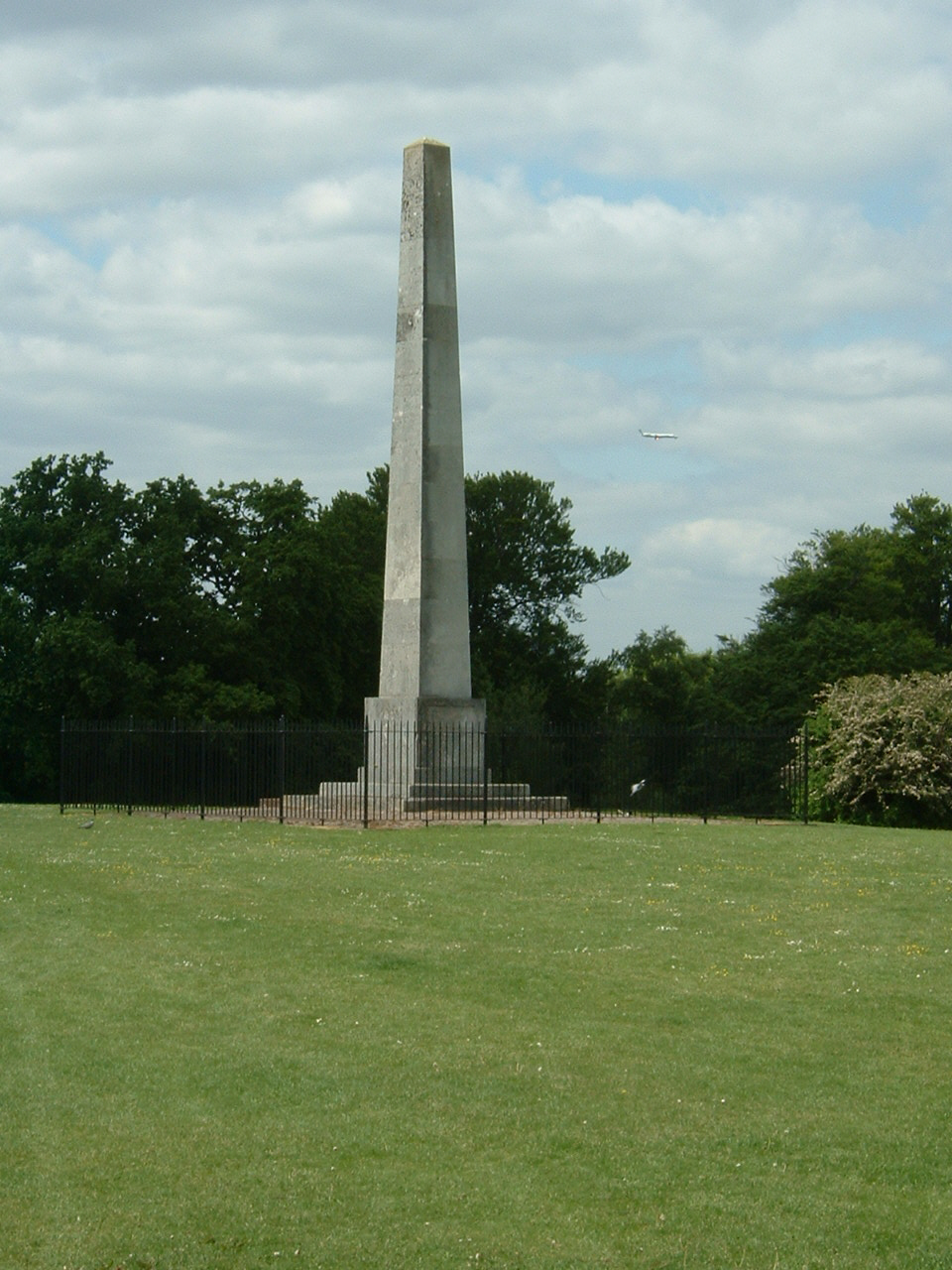
The Obelisk in Mayfield Park

In 1762, Walter Taylor built a water-powered wood-working mill on the stream that runs through what is now Mayfield Park.

Granville Augustus William Waldegrave (1833–1913), 3rd Lord Radstock and his heirs previously owned the Mayfield estate in Woolston.

Mayfield Park contains a monument to Whig politician Charles James Fox. That Obelisk has given its name to a local street and a public house in Woolston.

Sir Thomas Longmore, Professor of Military surgery at the Royal Victoria Military Hospital had a house in Woolston

Amelia Earhart, the first woman to fly solo across the Atlantic came ashore at Woolston on 19 June 1928.

The world's first international flying boat service from Woolston to Le Havre was introduced by Supermarine in 1919.

HMS Woolston, was a W-class escort destroyer, built towards the end of World War I, which saw action on escort duties in World War II. It was scrapped in 1947.

In 1928, Oliver Simmonds formed the Simmonds Aircraft Co.Ltd and produced the Simmonds Spartan aircraft. The prototype was built in his house in Woolston, the first production model was assembled at the Royal Navy Rolling Mills building, off Archery Rd in Woolston.

== Lost streets and buildings ==
Lost streets/buildings in area of Itchen Bridge
Street or Area	Building	Dates shown
Oakbank Road	Oddfellows Hall	1881, 1897
Oakbank Road	Ebenezeer Hall	1933
Oakbank Road	Employment Exchange	1933
Roselands		1881, 1897
Woolston Lawn		1881,1897

Late-19th-century maps show that on the southern side of Woolston railway station, in the area bounded by Manor Road, Portsmouth Road and Bridge Road, there were areas known as Woolston Lawn and Roselands. An 1881 map shows that Roselands also extended to the east of Manor Road but by 1897, the eastern portion of that estate had been developed, including a Masonic Hall. The 1897 map also shows that there was a fountain in Roselands. Whilst those maps do not explicitly describe Roselands as being the Manor House, the opulence of Roselands and the presence of the Masonic Hall indicate that it was an affluent area at the end of the 19th century. The name Manor Road also suggests that the Manor House was situated somewhere in this area. The 19th-century maps also show that Woolston Lawn adjoined a Vicarage, literally within sight of another Vicarage located in neighbouring Itchen Ferry village. Upper Vicarage Road and Lower Vicarage Road seem to have taken their names from those two buildings. Much of this area now lies beneath the Itchen Bridge, its toll booths and control room, though some were destroyed during World War II

Ordnance Survey map NC/0317894 of 1870 shows Woolston House at the top of what is now St. Annes Road, at its junction with Portsmouth Road. The same map shows Woolston Coastguard Station in what is now Glen Road.

== Changes to street names ==
Current name	Previous name
Bishops Road	High Street
Florence Road	Alma Road
Glen Road	Grove Road
Hazel Road	Elm Road
Keswick Road	Albert Road
Laurel Road	Ivy Road
Poole Road	Brook Road
Radstock Road	Avenue Road
Sea Road	Hill Street
St Annes Road	Milton Road
Swift Road	Onslow Road
Tankerville Road	Britannia Road
Walpole Road	Avenue Road
Wharncliffe Road	Cliff Road

When Woolston was absorbed into Southampton in 1920, there were some duplicated street names. Several street names in Woolston (and Itchen) were changed in 1924 to avoid the consequential confusion. These changes explain some local peculiarities, such as the naming of Milton House in St. Annes Road (previously Milton Road).
