= Star Trek: Nemesis (soundtrack) =

Star Trek: Nemesis – Music from the Original Motion Picture Soundtrack

Soundtrack album by Jerry Goldsmith
- Released: December 10, 2002 (Original); January 6, 2014 (Deluxe Edition)
- Recorded: August 13–15, 2002; Paramount Scoring Stage M, Los Angeles, California
- Genre: Film score
- Length: 48:24 (Original); 115:14 (Deluxe Edition)
- Label: Varèse Sarabande
- Producers: Jerry Goldsmith, Robert Townson

Jerry Goldsmith chronology
The Sum of All Fears (2002)	Star Trek: Nemesis – Music from the Original Motion Picture Soundtrack (2002)	Looney Tunes: Back in Action (2003)

Professional ratings
Review scores
Source	Rating
Allmusic	3/5 stars
Filmtracks	2/5 stars
Soundtrack Review	3.5/5 stars

Star Trek: Nemesis – Music from the Original Motion Picture Soundtrack is a soundtrack album for the 2002 film, Star Trek: Nemesis, composed and conducted by Jerry Goldsmith and performed by the Hollywood Studio Symphony. Released on December 10, 2002 through Varèse Sarabande, the soundtrack features fourteen tracks of score at a running time just over forty-eight minutes, though bootleg versions containing the entire score have since been released. A deluxe edition soundtrack limited to 5000 copies was released on January 6, 2014 by Varèse Sarabande.

It would be Goldsmith's final Star Trek score before his death in 2004.

== Track listing ==
#	Name	Length	Description
1	"Remus"	1:55	This is the fanfare for the Paramount Pictures logo and opening titles, followed by a meeting at the Romulan Imperial Senate.
2	"The Box"	2:20	Thalaron radiation mist is released in the senate room.
3	"My Right Arm"	1:02	Picard's best man speech at Riker and Troi's wedding.
4	"Odds and Ends"	4:37	Picard, Worf, and Data discover android remnants on Kolarus III that resemble Data.
5	"Repairs"	6:26	The android is reassembled and revealed as an earlier version of Data named B-4.
6	"The Knife"	3:09	Picard and his crew meet Praetor Shinzon for the first time.
7	"Ideals"	2:15	Picard and Shinzon bond over their shared aspirations.
8	"The Mirror"	5:21	Shinzon holds Picard as his prisoner before Data rescues him.
9	"The Scorpion"	2:21	Picard and Data commandeer a Scorpion class attack fighter to escape the "Scimitar."
10	"Lateral Run"	3:54	The Remans conduct a boarding party on the "Enterprise".
11	"Engage"	2:12	The Enterprise is used to ram into the Scimitar.
12	"Final Flight"	3:47	Picard boards the Scimitar alone and faces off against Shinzon.
13	"A New Friend"	2:36	The crew mourn and reminisce the death of Data.
14	"A New Ending"	6:08	The end credits incorporate the "Theme from Star Trek" as well as "Blue Skies" by Irving Berlin.

== The Deluxe Edition ==
Star Trek: Nemesis – The Deluxe Edition

Soundtrack album by Jerry Goldsmith
- Released: January 6, 2014 (Deluxe Edition)
- Genre: Film score
- Length: 115:14 (Deluxe Edition)
- Label: Varèse Sarabande
- Producers: Jerry Goldsmith, Robert Townson

On January 6, 2014 Varèse Sarabande released an expanded 5000-copy limited edition album of the score entitled Star Trek: Nemesis – The Deluxe Edition. The 2-disc album features many previously unreleased cues as well as source music and alternate cues and mixes. The final track of the album entitled "Director and Composer" provides the audio to the final moments of Goldsmith on the Star Trek scoring stage with his orchestra and director Stuart Baird.

Album cues from the original CD are bolded in the following track listing, though the lengths of several of the original CD cues are different.

Disc 1:

No.	Title	Length
1.	"**Remus***"	2:01
2.	"**The Box**"	2:21
3.	"**My Right Arm**"	1:04
4.	"Star Field** / Positronic"	1:57
5.	"The Argo"	1:17
6.	"**Odds and Ends**"	4:39
7.	"Your Brother / Course Plotted**"	2:07
8.	"**Repairs****"	6:27
9.	"**The Knife**"	3:10
10.	"Perfect Timing / Allegiance"	2:21
11.	"Secrets"	1:28
12.	"The Mine"	1:30
13.	"**Ideals**"	2:16
14.	"Options"	0:55
15.	"Bed Time / Transport"	1:38
16.	"Blood Test"	1:23
17.	"**The Mirror**"	5:23
18.	"**The Scorpion****"	2:24
19.	"His Plans / Data & B-4"	2:39
20.	"Battle Stations**"	2:40
21.	"Attack Pattern"	2:22
22.	"The Invitation / True Nature / Let’s Go to Work"	4:38
23.	"**Lateral Run**"	3:55
24.	"The Victory"	0:20

Disc 2:

No.	Title	Length
1.	"**Engage**"	2:14
2.	"Full Reverse"	1:41
3.	"Not Functional"	2:54
4.	"**Final Flight**"	3:49
5.	"Firing Sequence"	0:54
6.	"**A New Friend**"	2:38
7.	"That Song** / An Honor"	1:24
8.	"**A New Ending***†**"	8:30
9.	"Riker’s Strut #1 (Mike Lang)"	1:07
10.	"Riker’s Strut #2 (Mike Lang)"	1:09
11.	"Blue Skies† (Vocal By Brent Spiner)"	3:17
12.	"Blue Skies† (Instrumental)"	2:37
13.	"Secrets (Alternative Mix)"	1:29
14.	"The Mine (Alternate)"	1:33
15.	"Options (Alternate)"	0:57
16.	"Options (Alternate Mix)"	0:58
17.	"Data & B-4 (Alternate)"	1:39
18.	"Battle Stations** (Alternate Mix)"	2:44
19.	"Attack Pattern (Alternate Mix)"	2:24
20.	"True Nature (Alternate Mix)"	1:30
21.	"A New Ending*†** (Alternate)"	6:11
22.	"Director and Composer"	2:35

* - Contains "Theme from Star Trek (TV Series)" by Alexander Courage & Gene Roddenberry
** - Contains "Theme from Star Trek: The Motion Picture" by Jerry Goldsmith
† - Contains "Blue Skies" by Irving Berlin

== Personnel ==
Credits adopted from Allmusic:

Production

- Jerry Goldsmith – composer, conductor, producer
- Alexander Courage – original material
- Gene Roddenberry – original material
- Robert Townson – executive producer
- Hollywood Studio Symphony – orchestra
- Sandy DeCrescent – orchestra contractor
- Endre Granat – concertmaster
- Lois Carruth – assistant to composer

Orchestration and technical

- Conrad Pope – orchestration
- Mark McKenzie – orchestration
- Nick Vidar – programming
- Bruce Botnick – engineer
- Norm Dlugatch – assistant engineer
- Dominic Gonzalez – assistant engineer
- Paul Wertheimer – assistant engineer
- Ken Hall – music editor

== See also ==
- List of Star Trek composers and music
