= Alldays =

Alldays may refer to:

- Alldays (supermarket), a chain of convenience stores in the UK
- Alldays, Limpopo, a town in South Africa
- Alldays (1898 automobile), an early British automobile

== See also ==
- Allday (disambiguation)
- All Day (disambiguation)
