= The Players Band =

American ska band

- Origin: Baltimore, Maryland, United States
- Genres: Ska/Reggae
- Years active: 1999 - Present
- Members: Dan Schneider; Nick Reider; David Saunier; Michael Gorman; Craig Considine; Paul Ackerman aka “Pablo Fiasco” Joe Ross; Andy Schneider; Mark Leary; Kristin "Lady Hatchet" Forbes; Marc Levine

The Players Band is an American 10-piece ska band formed in Baltimore in 1999. The band's musical style combines Jamaican ska, rock, and reggae, and is characterized by the use of upbeat horns and percussion. The band has performed over 500 live shows in various states, including; Maryland, Pennsylvania, Washington, DC, New York, Delaware, New Jersey, Long Island, Vermont, and Virginia. The Players Band has performed with acts such as Grammy Award Winner The Isley Brothers, Grammy Award Winner Toots & the Maytals, The B-52's, The Mighty Mighty Bosstones, Joe Strummer, Matisyahu, The English Beat, Third Eye Blind, Citizen Cope, Fishbone, The Toasters, The Skatalites, Reel Big Fish, The Pietasters, The Aggrolites, The Slackers, Rebirth Brass Band, Big D and the Kids Table, The Know How, King Django, The Scofflaws, Westbound Train, Eastern Standard Time, Junkyard Band and many others. Notable ska musicians who have performed on stage with The Players Band as guests include; Adam Birch (The Specials), Jeff Richey (The Toasters), Buford O’Sullivan (The Scofflaws), Vinny Noble (Pilfers & Bim Skala Bim), Dr. Ring-Ding, Morgan Russell (Eastern Standard Time) and H.R. (Bad Brains).

== Discography ==
=== Studio albums ===
- Instrumental - 2001
- Hate the Game - 2003, Victor Rice mixed 'Mama' & 'Rub A Dub'.
- Half-Time - 2005
- Live & Direct - 2008
- Skamörgåsbord - 2020, mixed by Victor Rice.
- SKAZILLA! - 2025, mixed by Victor Rice.

=== Compilations ===
- D.C-ENE - 2001 on PGU Records
- Make It Happen – 2001 on Big Touchin’ Productions
- Oasis Alternative - 2002 on Oasis
- Still Standing - 2003 by Jump Up Records and Megalith Records Still Standing (ska compilation)
- Stubborn Records Sampler - 2005 on Stubborn Records
- The Way Things Used to Be Vol. 1 - 2020 on Bob Records

== Band members ==
- Dan Schneider - guitar/vocals - (Current member of The Pietasters)
- Nick Reider – trumpet - (Current member of Jah Works, touring member of Bumpin Uglies)
- David Saunier – sax
- Michael Gorman - bari sax
- Craig Considine - trombone (Current member of the All Mighty Senators)
- Paul Ackerman aka “Pablo Fiasco” - keys – (Current member of Left Alone, H.R. and the Dubb Agents, Bad Manners, and formerly of The Pietasters, Stubborn All-Stars, and Skinnerbox.)
- Joe Ross - bass - (Current member of The Pietasters)
- Andy Schneider - drums
- Mark Leary - vocals/percussion
- Kristin "Lady Hatchet" Forbes - bass/guitar (Touring member of The Slackers)
- Marc Levine - percussion

== Notable press ==
- Jackson, D. (2025). “SKAZILLA! and more.” Bearded Gentleman Music.
- Campbell, E. (2008). "The Players Band goes live." The Baltimore Examiner.
- Lee, P. (2007). ""Players Band" Performs At New Year's Spectacular." WJZ-TV, CBS Broadcasting Inc.
- Baylor, A. (2007). “Soundcheck, The Players.” The Baltimore Sun.
- Campbell, E. (2006). “Group plays benefit for homeless in Catonsville.” The Examiner.
- Sattler, D. (2006). “Hungry for help.” The View.
- Sattler, D. (2006). “Rock Steady, The Players are playing for big money. But not their own.” The View.
- Ames, M. (2006). “Brothers play for homeless.” The Catonsville Times.
- Lewis, J. (2006). "The Players Band, Halftime.” Baltimore Magazine.
- Unknown. (2006). “The Players Band will rock Alive @ Five event.” Gazette.
- Schaffer, S. (2004). “The Players.” The Baltimore Sun.
- Wollan, L. (2003). “The Players Band.” Music Monthly.
- Lewis, J. (2003). “The Players Band, Hate the Game.” Baltimore Magazine.
- Buckley, M. (2003). “The Players Band.” Chesapeake Music Guide.
- Unknown. (2003). “The Players.” Viking Remedy Magazine (France).
- Trawinski, J. (2003). “Hate the Game' is a jam driven album.” Towson University Towerlight.
- Scruggs, S. (2003). “The Players, Hate The Game.” Music Monthly.
- Wollan, L. (2001). “The Players, Instrumental.” Music Monthly.
- Jones, D. (2001). “The Players, Instrumental.” Rude Roots Magazine.

== Notable quotes ==
"Fantastic! You guys are tough." Buckwheat Zydeco.
"Your band freaking rocks!" Joe Strummer.
"Those guys are nice, really nice." Angelo Moore
"A rocking big band out of Baltimore and DC, the Players can hit all the styles and are a must-see live!" - AP Magazine (Alternative Press magazine). August, 2003.

== Radio play ==
89.7 FM WTMD, Towson, MD; Ocean 98.1 WOCM, Ocean City, MD; Southern FM 88.3, Brighton, Victoria; 106.7 FM The Fan, Washington, DC; KQBH-LA 101.5 FM, Los Angeles, CA; 97.9 FM 98 Rock, Baltimore, MD; 105.7 FM Live 105.7, Baltimore, MD; DC 101 FM, Washington, DC: 103.1 FM WRNR, Annapolis, MD: 103.1 FM WAFY, Frederick, MD; 99.1 FM WHFS, Washington, DC; 91.7 FM KVRX, Austin, TX; 88.3 FM WAIF, Cincinnati, OH; 101.9 FM CITR, Vancouver, B.C.; 89.5 FM CIUT, Toronto, ON; 105.3 FM WEBK, Killington, VT; 90.5 FM, Syracuse, NY; Holland Radio De B.R.T.O. zendt uit via de kabel op 87.5 MHz.
