= Turbo (The Pietasters album) =

Studio album by The Pietasters
- Released: August 6, 2002
- Recorded: Cue Studios, 2002
- Genre: Ska/soul
- Length: 39:52
- Label: Fueled by Ramen
- Producers: Todd Harris; The Pietasters

The Pietasters chronology
Awesome Mix Tape vol. 6 (1999)	Turbo (2002)	All Day (2007)

Professional ratings
Review scores
Source	Rating
Allmusic	4/5 stars

Turbo is the fifth album by the ska/soul band The Pietasters. It was released in 2002 (see 2002 in music).

== Track listing ==
1. "Told You the First Time" (Pezzimenti/Jackson) – 2:28
2. "Set Me Up" (Pezzimenti/Jackson) – 2:51
3. "Drunken Master" (Morgan/Selah) – 4:01
4. "Rachel" (Pezzimenti/Jackson) – 3:22
5. "Mellow Mood" (Bob Marley) – 2:21
6. "Every Afternoon" (Hansen) – 3:19
7. "Got to Stay" (Pezzimenti/Jackson) – 3:42
8. "Step Right Up" (Morgan) – 3:17
9. "Wrong With You" (Linares) – 2:39
10. "Trust Yourself" (Pezzimenti/Jackson) – 3:36
11. "Nothing Good to Eat" (Vic Ruggiero) – 2:44
12. "Malmo" (Pezzimenti/Jackson/Roberts) – 2:27
13. "How We Were Before" (Colin Blunstone) – 3:05

== Personnel ==
- Stephen Jackson - vocals
- Toby Hansen - guitar
- Jorge Pezzimenti - bass guitar
- Rob Steward - drums
- Alan Makranczy - sax
- Jeremy Roberts - trombone
- Carlos Linares - trumpet
- Erick Morgan - keyboards
- DJ Selah - additional vocals and chat
- Hayes Smith - baritone sax
- Todd Eckhardt - bass guitar on track 5
- Tom Goodin - guitar on track 5
- Jeb Crandall - keyboards on track 5
- Todd Harris - production
- Rich Isaac - engineering
- Seth Foster - mastering
