= Allday (disambiguation) =

Allday (born Tom Gaynor, 1991) is an Australian rapper.

Allday may also refer to:

- David Allday (born 1964), Australian rules footballer
- Peter Allday (1927–2018), British hammer thrower
- Steve Allday (born 1957), American equine veterinarian
- Suzanne Allday (1934–2017), British hammer thrower and discus thrower, wife of Peter
- AllDay Project, a South Korean music group that debuted in 2025

== See also ==
- All Day (disambiguation)
- Alday (surname)
- Alldays (disambiguation)
