= The Pietasters (album) =

Studio album by The Pietasters
- Released: 1993
- Genre: Ska, soul
- Length: 47:13
- Label: Slugtone; Moon Records
- Producer: Nick Nichols; Cobb Ervin; The Pietasters

The Pietasters chronology
| All You Can Eat (1992) | The Pietasters (1993) | Oolooloo (1995) |

Professional ratings
Review scores
| Source | Rating |
|---|---|
| AllMusic | link |

The Pietasters, also commonly referred to as Piestomp, is the first album by the ska/soul band the Pietasters. It was released in 1993 on Slugtone. Alternative recordings had earlier been released on cassette as All You Can Eat and The Ska-Rumptious 7 Inch. The CD was reissued in 2000 and made available through the band's website.

== Track listing ==
- All songs by The Pietasters unless noted.
1. "Intro" (1:09)
2. "Dollar Bill" (3:26)
3. "Perfect World" (2:56)
4. "Little Engine" (3:24)
5. "Night Owl"(2:43) (Tony Allen; cover of single version by Bad Habits)
6. "Model Citizen" (4:23)
7. "Factory Concerto" ("Powerhouse" by Raymond Scott, from Looney Tunes) (2:51)
8. "Ace Miller" (2:19)
9. "Metro" (2:50)
10. "Five Days of the Week" (3:16)
11. "Catalog Bohemian" (2:37)
12. "Pietaster" (4:26)
13. "Without You" (3:30)

- "Factory" (4:50) (hidden track)

== Personnel ==
- Stephen Jackson – vocals
- Talmage Bayer – vocals
- Tom Goodin – guitar
- Chris Watt – bass guitar
- Ben Gauslin – drums
- Eric Raecke – tenor saxophone
- Rob French – trombone
- Carlos Linares – trumpet
- Caroline Boutwell – farfisa
- Cool 'Casian Don – vocals on track 6
- Nick Nichols – producer, mixer
- Cobb Ervin – producer, mixer
- Max Henkel – additional engineering
