= All Day (The Pietasters album) =

Studio album by The Pietasters
- Released: August 21, 2007
- Genre: Ska/soul
- Label: Indication; Red Eye Usa
- Producer: Todd Harris; Jorge Pezzimenti; The Pietasters

The Pietasters chronology
Turbo (2002)	All Day (2007)

Professional ratings
Review scores
Source	Rating
Allmusic	4/5 stars

All Day is an album by The Pietasters, released on August 21, 2007 on Indication Records. It includes material that the band had been writing for the previous three years.

== Track listing ==
1. "Change My Ways" (Pezzimenti) – 2:54
2. "Don't Wanna Know" (Pezzimenti) – 3:34
3. "Late Night Call" (Pezzimenti) – 3:44
4. "Triflin'" (Pezzimenti) – 3:17
5. "Keep on Lyin'" (Pezzimenti) – 3:12
6. "Dream of You" (Jackson/Pezzimenti) – 3:49
7. "Anj Gil" (Pezzimenti) – 2:32
8. "Fozzy (Part 1)" (Jackson/Pezzimenti) – 3:28
9. "Listen to Her Heart" (Petty) – 3:12
10. "So Long" (Pezzimenti) – 2:31
11. "Ordinary" (Jackson/Pezzimenti) – 3:09
12. "Oolooloo" (Pezzimenti) – 2:43
13. "Sketch Dub" (Crandall) – 3:44
14. "G to F" (Jackson/Pezzimenti) – 3:24
15. "All Day" (Pezzimenti) - appears on Japanese edition
16. "Concept" (Blake) - appears on Japanese edition
17. "Jasper's Fade" (Pezzimenti) - appears on Japanese edition

== Personnel ==
- Stephen Jackson - vocals
- Jorge Pezzimenti - bass guitar, guitar, keyboards, vocals, producer
- Toby Hansen - guitar, vocals
- Rob Steward - drums
- Alan Makranczy - saxophone, vocals, melodica
- Jeremy Roberts - trombone, vocals
- Carlos Linares - trumpet, vocals
- Todd Harris - producer, percussion, background vocals, engineer, mixing
- Jeb Crandall - keyboards
- Jeff Watkins - saxophone
- Tammy Harris - handclapping, laughs
- Sean Russell - engineer
- Seth Foster - mastering
