= Powerhouse (instrumental) =

- Brunswick 78 rpm issue of Raymond Scott's "Powerhouse"

Single by The Raymond Scott Quintette
- B-side: "The Toy Trumpet"
- Released: 1937
- Recorded: February 20, 1937
- Genre: Novelty, jazz
- Length: 2:56
- Label: Master Records; Brunswick; Columbia
- Songwriter: Raymond Scott

Audio
- "Powerhouse" performed by The Raymond Scott Quintette on YouTube

"Powerhouse" is a 1937 instrumental musical composition by American bandleader and composer Raymond Scott. It was recorded by his six-piece Raymond Scott Quintet and originally released on Master Records. The composition appeared in several animated short films produced by Warner Bros. Cartoons, often as background music for chase sequences and factory settings.

== History ==
In scripted comments read on the First Anniversary Special of CBS Radio's Saturday Night Swing Club, on which the Raymond Scott Quintette performed, host Paul Douglas announced that "Powerhouse" had been premiered on that program in January or early February 1937.

Scott's Quintette (actually a sextet) first recorded "Powerhouse" in New York on February 20, 1937, along with three other titles. This recording was first commercially issued on the Irving Mills-owned Master Records label as Master 111 (mx. M-120-1), coupled with another Scott composition, "The Toy Trumpet". After the demise of the Master label late in 1937, "Powerhouse" was reissued on Brunswick 7993, and subsequently on Columbia 36311 (after the CBS purchase of ARC, which included the Brunswick catalog). The same take was issued on all releases. (An unreleased 1939 recording by the original Scott Quintette was issued in 2002 on the two-CD Scott compilation Microphone Music.)

The personnel on the February 20, 1937, version are:

- Raymond Scott – piano
- Dave Harris – saxophone
- Pete Pumiglio – clarinet
- Dave Wade – trumpet
- Louis Shoobe – double bass
- Johnny Williams – drums

"Powerhouse" and "The Toy Trumpet" remained in Scott's repertoire for decades, and both were adapted for Warner Bros. cartoon soundtracks by WB music director Carl Stalling along with a dozen other Scott titles, and both have been recorded by numerous other artists. Stalling, who spiced his scores with "Powerhouse" dozens of times, never created a complete version of the work, with all his adaptations existing as excerpts.

The United States publisher of the title is Wise Music Group. Outside the U.S., the title is controlled by Warner/Chappell Music.

== Structure ==
Structurally, "Powerhouse" consists of two distinct – and seemingly unrelated – musical themes, played at different tempos. Both have been used in numerous cartoons. The first theme, sometimes referred to as "Powerhouse A", is a frantic passage typically employed in chase and high-speed vehicle scenes to imply whirlwind velocity. The slower theme, "Powerhouse B", is the "assembly line" music, which sometimes accompanies scenes of repetitive, machine-like activity. "Powerhouse" in its entirety places "B" in the center while "A" opens and closes the work (ternary form).

== Use in cartoon works ==
The first use of "Powerhouse" in a cartoon occurred in the 1943 Warner Bros. Looney Tunes short Porky Pig's Feat, directed by Frank Tashlin. Also in 1943, it was used in the Private Snafu shorts Gripes, Spies, and Rumors. It was subsequently featured in over 40 other Warner Bros. cartoons. The most well-known "assembly-line" usage of "Powerhouse B" occurs in Bob Clampett's Baby Bottleneck (1946), in which newborn babies (of various species) are processed on a conveyor belt in time to the melody.

The "Powerhouse A" section is featured prominently during Bugs Bunny's altercation with a gremlin in Clampett's 1943 Merrie Melodies cartoon Falling Hare. Stalling's lengthiest adaptation of the "Powerhouse A" section is interpolated during the beginning and end of the rocket travel sequence in the 1953 Merrie Melodies cartoon Duck Dodgers in the 24½th Century (directed by Chuck Jones). It starts at roughly 2:20, clocking in at one minute and twenty-five seconds.

Other Warner cartoons which contain excerpts from "Powerhouse" include Birdy and the Beast (1944), Cat-Tails for Two (1953), Early to Bet (1951), His Bitter Half (1950), House-Hunting Mice (1948), It's Hummer Time (1950), Jumpin' Jupiter (1955), Rocket Squad (1956), A Sheep in the Deep (1962), Compressed Hare (1961), and dozens more.

In the 1960s, producer Hal Seeger and composer/arranger Winston Sharples adapted "Powerhouse" and other Scott compositions in dozens of episodes of their Batfink cartoon series.

The original Raymond Scott Quintette recordings, including "Powerhouse", were licensed in the early 1990s for soundtrack usage in twelve episodes of The Ren & Stimpy Show. Various passages of the tune have been arranged for use in The Simpsons, Duckman, The Bernie Mac Show, and The Drew Carey Show (in a brief scene involving an animated character). An entire 1993 episode of Animaniacs, "Toy Shop Terror", was set to Warner Bros. music director Richard Stone's arrangement of the composition. "Powerhouse" also served as bumper theme music for Cartoon Network from 1998 to 2003, and can be heard as a systematic rock theme in the 2003 feature film Looney Tunes: Back in Action.

"Powerhouse" has been used in The Simpsons four times, usually in reference to the Warner Bros. cartoons. The first occurs in "And Maggie Makes Three" (Season 6, Episode 13) during a montage of a bowling pin assembly line. In the episode "Bart Has Two Mommies" (Season 17, Episode 14), "Powerhouse" B is adapted in a scene that pays homage to the 1937 Disney short The Old Mill, when Homer Simpson gets caught in the Old Mill while trying to save his Rubber Duckie. In the episode "Little Big Girl" (Season 18, Episode 12), "Powerhouse" was used during the sequence where the fire at Cletus' farm is lit. In the episode "The Fool Monty" (Season 22, Episode 6), "Powerhouse" was adapted as background music for a construction scene in which Charles Montgomery Burns, having lost his memory, is led to a dangerous construction site by Homer Simpson, who seeks revenge for Burns' years of cruel behavior. Burns walks along moving girders, narrowly avoids flying rivets, and other well-worn cartoon construction site gags. Simpsons creator Matt Groening once ranked "Powerhouse" as #14 on a list of his "100 Favorite Things".

In the SpongeBob SquarePants episode "Broken Alarm" from season 12, an arrangement plays over a scene of SpongeBob SquarePants using a Rube Goldberg machine to get to work. The arrangement uses an ukulele, an instrument traditionally used in SpongeBob music.

"Powerhouse", with added lyrics and a new arrangement, was used as a recurring song in the Looney Tunes animated series Bugs Bunny Builders entitled "Hard Hat Time" by composer Matthew Janszen.

An arrangement of the song by Joshua Moshier was also used for the "Push the Button, Pull the Crank" sequence in the 2024 film The Day the Earth Blew Up, while Daffy Duck and Porky Pig work in the Goodie Gum factory.

A Shibuya-kei influenced arrangement of "Powerhouse B" was used in the Battle for Dream Island episode "Fishes and Dishes" during the scene where Two complains about their plates being washed away by the pool water and ending up at "the steepest hill" of the grasslands, then going up the "zoomy ramp of Yoyle legend", then falling on the clouds in the sky, and finally sinking into the Goiky Canal.

== Recent performances, recordings, and usages ==
In recent years, Powerhouse has been recorded by jazz clarinetist Don Byron on his album Bug Music, jazz pianist Ted Kooshian on his 2009 CD Ted Kooshian's Standard Orbit Quartet: Underdog, and other Stories..., pedal steel guitarist Jon Rauhouse, The Metropole Orchestra, The Beau Hunks Sextette, The Coctails, and jazz guitarist Skip Heller. The title, as arranged by Michelle DiBucci, has been in the repertoire of Kronos Quartet since 1994.

The rock band Rush adapted part of "Powerhouse" in their 1978 instrumental "La Villa Strangiato" (5:49 into the track) on their Hemispheres album, as did ska/soul band The Pietasters in Factory Concerto on their 1993 self-titled album. Alternative jazz group Soul Coughing sampled it in "Bus to Beelzebub" from their 1994 album Ruby Vroom. The tune has also been appropriated by They Might Be Giants (on "Rhythm Section Want Ad"), Devo (on "Fraulein"), and others. Other contemporary artists who have recorded versions of "Powerhouse" include Thelonious Moog, The Tiptons (with Amy Denio), Quartet San Francisco, and Steroid Maximus (featuring J. G. Thirlwell). Lee Presson and the Nails included it on their album Jump-swing from Hell: Live At the Hi-ball Lounge.

In 2006-2007, the "assembly line" theme was used in a highly choreographed commercial for the Visa check card. The commercial, entitled "Lunch", was staged in a manner intended to be reminiscent of the tune's cartoon uses.

In August 2009, Sinking Ship Productions staged a musical portrait of Raymond Scott entitled Powerhouse at the New York International Fringe Festival. The composition "Powerhouse" was used as a recurring theme. Sinking Ship presented a revised and fully-staged version of the production at the New Ohio Theatre in Manhattan in 2014.

On August 8, 2013, the Raymond Scott Orchestrette performed an arrangement of "Powerhouse" to accompany Dance Heginbotham's choreographic work Manhattan Research at New York's Lincoln Center Out of Doors summer concert series.

"Powerhouse" was also used in some PBS commercials in 2000 urging viewers to shop.

In 2014, the Dubuque, Iowa, Colts Drum and Bugle Corps included "Powerhouse" as part of their show, "Dark Side of the Rainbow". In 2016, Bethesda Softworks used the Scott Quintette's original 1937 recording in a showcase presentation for Fallout 4 and Fallout Shelter.

In 2017, Chapo Trap House utilized the piece for their Call of Cthulhu tabletop role-playing game series.

The "assembly line" section was used on Neil Cicierega's 2020 album Mouth Dreams in the song "Whitehouse", in which it was matched up with the vocals to The White Stripes' "Fell in Love with a Girl".

In April 2021, the tune was used in the CBS TV show Young Sheldon, in the opening scene of the episode "Mitch's Son and the Unconditional Approval of a Government Agency" (season 4, ep. 14).
