= PS Windsor Castle =

History
- Name: 1891–1895: Windsor Castle; 1895–1898: Culzean Castle; 1898–1900: Carrick Castle; 1900–1906: Nagadan; 1906–1913: Nagara Maru; 1913–1935: Tenri Maru
- Operator: 1891–1895: Bournemouth, Swanage & Poole Steam Packet Company; 1896–1898: Glasgow, Ayrshire, and Campbeltown Steamboat Company; 1898–1900: London and North Eastern Railway; 1900–1906: Russian-Chinese Eastern Railway, 1906-1909: U. Nakamura, Osaka; 1909-1920: Nakamura Goshi Kaisha, Kashiwadahama; 1920-1923: Sanyo Kisen K.K., Nichinomiya; 1923-1924: Taniya Zenji, Nishinomiya; 1924-1935 Aoi Kisen K.K., Nishinomiya
- Port of registry: (United Kingdom)
- Builder: Southampton Naval Works
- Launched: 13 June 1891
- Maiden voyage: 31 July 1892

General characteristics
- Tonnage: 796 GRT
- Length: 246.5 ft (75.1 m)
- Beam: 27.5 ft (8.4 m)
- Draught: 10.2 ft (3.1 m)
- Installed power: 2,500 hp (1,900 kW)
- Propulsion: Paddle wheels
- Speed: 19 knots (35 km/h; 22 mph)
- Capacity: 1,595 passengers

PS Windsor Castle was a passenger vessel built for the Bournemouth, Swanage & Poole Steam Packet Company in 1891.

== History ==
She was constructed by the Southampton Naval Works and launched on 13 June 1891. She was christened by Miss Amy Newlyn, daughter of the chairman of the owning company.

The vessel was designed by John Havard Byles, the manager of the Southampton Naval Works whose plans and specifications had been approved by Professor Philip Jenkins, who occupied the chair of Naval Architecture at Glasgow University. The expectation was that she would enter service in August 1891. However, on her trial trip, the paddle wheels were found to be unsuitable both in design and size. They needed replacement and the sponson size needed reduction. Day and Summers, shipbuilders of Southampton carried out the necessary alterations.

Her triple-expansion engines developed 2,500 hp with a working boiler pressure of 150 to 160 lbs per square inch. Running this required three greasers and four firemen. She was certified for different passenger capacities depending on the certificate and route operated. For Bournemouth to Cherbourg, Le Havre or the Channel Islands 536 passengers, for Newhaven and Torquay 848 passengers, for journeys between The Needles and Langston Harbour 998 passengers, and within Poole Harbour 1,595 passengers.

She finally entered service for the Bournemouth, Swanage & Poole Steam Packet Company sailing out of Bournemouth. Her maiden voyage too place on 31 July 1892.

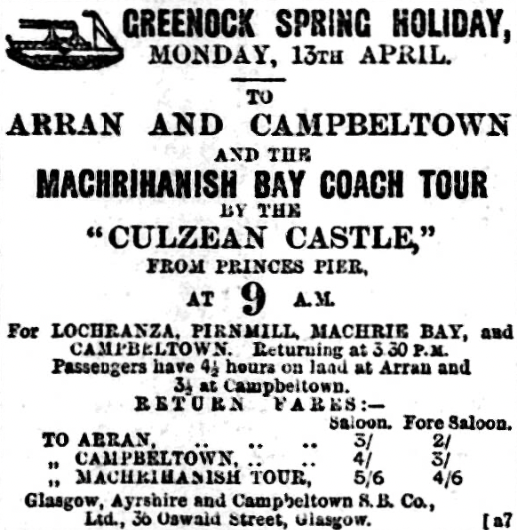
Advert from the Greenock Telegraph and Clyde Shipping Gazette, Wednesday 8 April 1896

She was sold in 1895 and renamed Culzean Castle to work on the River Clyde on a new service from Glasgow to Campbeltown. Initially she was timetabled for daily services from Gourock Prince’s Pier, leaving at 8.20am, calling at Dunoon, Rothesay, Fairlie, Millport, Lochranza, Pinmill, Machrie Bay, arriving in Campbeltown at 12.55pm. The return service departed Campbeltown at 3.00pm.

However, she experienced mechanical difficulties and continued unreliability resulted in a fairly short period of service. In 1898 she was sold to the Clyde Excursion Steamers and renamed Carrick Castle.

In 1900 she was sold to the Russian-Chinese Eastern Railway for services in the Sea of Japan. and was transported to Port Arthur naval base and renamed Nagadan. When the Russians evacuated Dalian in 1904, she was blown up to prevent the Japanese making use of her as a dispatch vessel, but the Japanese repaired her and she was put in service between various Japanese Islands initially as Nagara Maru, and finally as the Tenri Maru.

Her fate is uncertain. The Lloyds Shipping register for 1932 records that she has been dismantled, but another report says still in service in 1935.
