= James Alday =

16th century English navigator, explorer and privateer

- Born: 1516; Dartmouth, Devon, England
- Died: 1576?
- Piratical career
- Type: Privateer
- Allegiance: England
- Years active: 1540s
- Rank: Captain
- Base of operations: Galicia
- Commands: Trinity Gilbert
- Later work: Navigator, explorer

James Alday (1516–1576?) was a 16th-century English navigator, explorer and privateer. He participated in raids against the Spanish with fellow privateers James Logan and William Cooke during the 1540s and is credited, along with Sebastian Cabot and Henry Ostrich, of the start of regular trading between England and the Barbary coast.

He himself claimed to have organised the earliest known voyage to the Barbary coast "inventing the Barbary trade" and, although intending to command the expedition himself, Alday was forced to turn his command to another due to illness. This voyage was not successful however and a rival expedition commanded by Thomas Windham became the first to arrive there in 1551. His claim has generally been dismissed partly due to his involvement in piracy as well as lack of evidence.

== Biography ==
Alday was a Dartmouth skipper who was said to "hover between privateering and piracy". Commanding the Trinity Gilbert, he joined James Logan of the Flying Ghost and others in raiding the coast of Galicia during the 1540s. An apprentice and close friend of Sebastian Cabot, Alday was involved with Cabot and Henry Ostrich in plans to establish trade with the Barbary coast. He had organised the first voyage to the Barbary coast, however he fell seriously ill with the "great sweat" and was forced to turn his command over to another captain. This voyage was apparently unsuccessful as there are no records of its return and may have never left port. Thomas Windham would command a voyage that same year successfully reaching the Barbary coast in 1551. In a letter to his friend Michael Lok, Alday claimed that he and a number of members had come down with a "sweating sickness" and "whereon the chiefe of those with whom I joyned in that voyage died, that is to say, John Lutterel, John Fletcher, Henry Ostrich and others". Only Alday had survived, however by the time he had recovered Windham had already set sail for Morocco taken the ships from Portsmouth with him commenting "Windham had her away from thence, before I was able to stand upon my legges, by whom I had lost at that instant fourescore pound".

He volunteered to join Martin Frobisher in his 1576 voyage to search for the Northwest Passage being ready to risk his life "to the uttermost point"; his name does not appear on the list of surviving mariners who were paid after their return and it is presumed that he died on the expedition. However, he is recorded as commanding an unsuccessful expedition to Greenland on behalf of King Frederik II in 1579. His appointment was possibly due to his time with Frobisher and, with two ships, he sailed for Greenland with orders to reclaim the lost colony for the Norwegian crown and convert the inhabitants to Lutheranism. The expedition was delayed while one of the ships had to be replaced and then by stormy weather. By the time they had reached Greenland, they were unable to land due to the large amount of ice near the shore and returned. He most probably was the author of the oldest German manual of navigation, published in Lübeck in 1578.
