= Southampton Naval Works =

British ship builder

Coordinates: 50°53′40.3″N 1°23′1.7″W

- Type: Limited company
- Industry: Marine services
- Predecessors: Oswald Mordaunt and Co
- Founded: 1889; 137 years ago in Southampton
- Defunct: 8 September 1893
- Successor: J.G. Fay and Co
- Headquarters: Southampton, United Kingdom
- Key people: John Harvard Byles
- Products: Ships

Southampton Naval Works was a British ship building company based in Woolston, Southampton.

== History ==
The company was incorporated in 1889. It was set up to acquire the business of Oswald Mordaunt and Company with capital of £274,000 (equivalent to £30,440,000 in 2025). The company obtained full possession of the Woolston site in 1890 and John Harvard Byles was appointed as manager, transferring from J. and G. Thomson of Clydebank. The practical day to day operation of the shipyard was under the management of John Currie.

The company started construction of ships with the first launched in November 1890. They suffered a setback in January 1891 when a fire started in the saw mill in the yard which quickly spread to the carpenters’ shed, model loft and pattern room.

In August 1891 there was a strike by about 350 men employed in a dispute between the carpenters and shipwrights about the work of each respective trade.

The business floundered and in September 1891 a receiver was appointed by the Court of Chancery. All trading was stopped and 1,800 men were put out of work. At the point of closure the business had launched 18 vessels. Some vessels continued to be launched in 1892.

The works were advertised for sale in 1894 and the yard was taken over in 1897 by J.G. Fay and Co.

== List of ships built by the company ==
Completed	Name	Yard No	Tonnage	Description	Illustration
1890	Katy	#256	2,199 GRT	Cargo sailing ship, 35 feet (11 m) length, built for Christian Moller. Renamed Agnes in 1900. Destroyed by fire on 23 March 1905 near Cape Horn on route to Valparaíso.	
1891	Faunus	#257	919 GRT	Screw steamer cargo vessel for the Concordia Steamship Company of Newcastle-on-Tyne. The coaster struck a mine placed by SM UC-17 (Imperial German Navy) and sank in the North Sea 14 nautical miles (26 km) south by east of Flamborough Head, Yorkshire, United Kingdom. Six of her crew perished.	
1891	Celestina	#258	25 GRT	Screw Steamer tug	
1891	Rosendael	#259	448 GRT	Screw Steamer Coaster for Weatherley, Mead, and Hussey of London for the London to Dunkirk service. Renamed Prince George in 1899 when bought by the New Hellenic Steam Navigation Society and Prinkips Georgios in 1906 when boughts by the Cie. de. Nav. A Vapeur “Ermopolis”.	
1891	Cassel	#260	448 GRT	Screw Steamer coaster for Weatherley, Mead, and Hussey of London for the London to Dunkirk service. Later renamed Alejandro, then Ancud. Destroyed by an explosion June 1926 in Valparaíso.	
1891	Fjeld	#261	2,119 GRT	Cargo sailing ship for Consul Alf Monsen of Tønsberg, Norway. Destroyed by fire on 7 March 1895 on a voyage from Grimsby to San Diego.	
1891	Albis	#262	648 GRT	Screw steamer coaster for D. Fuhrmann, Hamburg. Renamed Minos in 1899. Sank on 10 January 1913 when in collision with SS Haparanda.	
1891	Crocodile	#263	100 GRT	Stern paddle wheel for Johnson, Heaney and Barrow of Cape Town for the mail service on the Pungwe River.	
1891	Jotora	#264	634 GRT	Screw steamer cargo vessel for Ca. Cal de Madrepora, Rio de Janeiro. Renamed Uniao in 1893. Removed from the Lloyds Register of Shipping in 1916. Fate uncertain.	
1891	Apore	#265	634 GRT	Screw steamer cargo vessel or Ca. Cal de Madrepora, Rio de Janeiro. Renamed Oceano in 1893. Ran aground and wrecked on 25 September 1897 on Estancia Bar.	
1891	Dalgonar	#266	2,665 GRT	Cargo sailing ship for Gracie, Beazley and Company of Liverpool. Abandoned on 13 October 1913 when the ballast shifted.	
1891	Annie Maud	#270	1,970 GRT	Cargo sailing ship for S Snape of Liverpool. Renamed Schwarzenbek in 1898 when bought by Knohr & Buchard in Hamburg and Llandaff in 1915 when taken by the Admiralty. Lost at sea in August 1915.	
1891	Prince of Wales	#271	280 GRT	Passenger paddle steamer for The Southampton, Isle of Wight and South of England Royal Mail Steam Packet Co. Limited. Withdrawn in 1937 and broken up in 1938 at Llanelli.	
1891	Crocodile	#273	2,557 GRT	Cargo sailing ship (four masted barque) for the Ship Crocodile Company Ltd owned by W. Thomas, Sons and Co of Liverpool. Renamed Storegut in 1915 when bought by A/S Excelsior of Kristiansand. Sunk by SM U-82 (Imperial German Navy) on 13 June 1917.	
1891	PS Windsor Castle	#274	796 GRT	Passenger paddle steamer for the Bournemouth, Swanage & Poole Steam Packet Company. Renamed Culzean Castle in 1895, Carrick Castle in 1899, Nagadan in 1900, Nagara Maru 1906 and Tenri Maru 1913. Broken up in 1932.	
