= The Pietasters =

American band

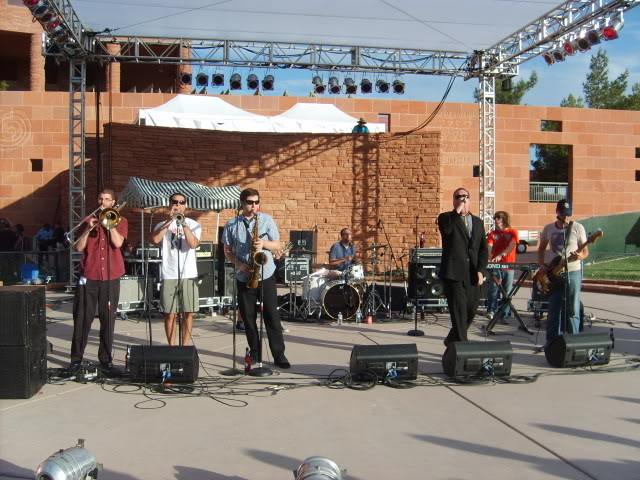
- The Pietasters performing at the 2007 International Ska Circus

Background information
- Origin: Washington, D.C., United States
- Genres: Ska, rocksteady, soul, punk rock
- Years active: 1990–present
- Labels: Slug Tone! Records, Moon Ska, Epitaph, Hellcat, Fueled by Ramen, Indication Records
- Members: Stephen Jackson; Alan Makranczy; Jeremy Roberts; Carlos Linares; Rob Steward; Dan Schneider; Dave Vermillion; Joe Ross
- Website: www.thepietasters.com

The Pietasters are an American eight-piece ska/soul band from Washington, D.C., with additional members from Maryland and Virginia.

== History ==
In 1990, Stephen Jackson and Chris Watt met at Virginia Tech, through mutual friend Tal Bayer, who was attending nearby Radford University, and they formed a ska band called the Slugs with their former schoolmate Tom Goodin, and an architecture classmate, Ben Gauslin. They changed their name to the Dancecrashers for a few months, before taking the name the Pietasters.

The newly formed band convinced the local college booking agency to bring the band Bad Manners from England to perform at the Virginia Tech auditorium, with them as the opening act. This was their first public performance, following shows they had staged in the living room of Jackson and Watt's rental house. The two bands later toured the U.S. and Europe together.

In the early 1990s, a similar band from the DC area, the Skunks, asked the Pietasters to play a local ska night at a bar in Georgetown, which was followed by a series of shows at dive bars in DC, Maryland, and Virginia. The manager of one of the bars, Nick Nichols, befriended the band and helped them record their first record, The Pietasters, also known as Piestomp.

In the summer of 1993, the Pietasters set out on their first national tour in a used school bus they had bought for $900. By the end of the tour, almost all of the original members quit the band, with only trumpeter Carlos Linares and lead singer Steve Jackson now remaining as original members.

The Pietasters recruited Jeremy Roberts, Toby Hansen, and Alan Makranczy as their new horn players; Rob Steward (Covington) on drums, and Paul Ackerman on keys. Tom Goodin remained on guitar. The new lineup continued to tour, and soon came to the attention of Bucket Hingley, frontman of the Toasters and owner of Moon Ska Records, who invited the Pietasters to join a tour package called "Skavoovie 94" with the Toasters and the Scofflaws. They also performed with artists including No Doubt, the Dance Hall Crashers, Hepcat, Let's Go Bowling, and the Skatalites. By the end of the tour, the Pietasters began recording Oolooloo on Moon Ska with Victor Rice producing.

Oolooloo came out in the summer of 1995, after which bassist Chris Watt left the Pietasters to perform with Eastern Standard Time, and Todd Eckhart moved from rhythm guitar to bass.

In 1995, the lead singer of the Mighty Mighty Bosstones, Dicky Barrett, approached the band at a show in Providence, Rhode Island, while they were considering breaking up, and offered to take them on the road over the next few years.

As the Pietasters continued to tour, they recorded Strapped Live! between stops in the Cat's Cradle in Chapel Hill, North Carolina and the Black Cat in Washington, DC., which was released in 1996. Throughout this period, the Pietasters had been recording new songs and covers and re-recording older tracks. The results ended up as a new/compilation album, Comply.

Meanwhile, the band filmed their first video in 1996, a live video filmed at the Scooter Rally and F'n Rock Party they produced at an old outdoor soul venue called Wilmer's Alley in Brandywine, Maryland. The video was filmed by Burning Toast Productions and featured scenes of the festival and live performance of the Pietasters playing their Jimmy Holiday cover, "The New Breed".

While backstage at a show in Los Angeles during a tour with the Mighty Mighty Bosstones, Tim Armstrong, guitarist with Rancid, and his business partner, Chris Qualiana, approached the band and asked if they would join a new label they were creating, Hellcat Records, also featuring the Slackers, Hepcat and Dropkick Murphys.

After clearing the move with Moon Ska, the Pietasters signed with Hellcat, a subsidiary of Epitaph Records, and their next album, Willis was recorded and released in 1997, produced by Brett Gurewitz, owner of Epitaph Records and guitarist for Bad Religion. The band recorded their second video, "Stone Feeling", to support this album, another live video with the assistance of Burning Toast Productions, filmed at a venue in Washington, D.C., and another video for "Out All Night", also filmed in Washington, D.C., and directed by Grady Cooper. They toured the U.S., followed by their first European tour, as well as making appearances on the Warped Tour and opening or headlining for the Reverend Horton Heat, the Ramones, the Cherry Poppin Daddies, Bad Brains, Ozomatli, the Bouncing Souls, Dropkick Murphy's, Murphy's Law, Fugazi, They Might Be Giants, H_{2}O, the Skatalites and Flogging Molly.

Their song "Out All Night" was featured in the video games Street Sk8er for the PlayStation, and NCAA Football 06.

In 1999, the Pietasters went back to the studio to record Awesome Mix Tape No. 6 for Epitaph's Hellcat Records, again recorded and produced by Brett Gurewitz, with portions of the album recorded at Tim Armstrong's house. The album was named after the mix-tape from Boogie Nights. The Pietasters recorded another video, "Yesterday's Over", to support the album. They finished the album and toured Europe with the Warped Tour, then the US again with the Pilfers and Spring Heeled Jack, ending 1999 with a period opening for Joe Strummer. Paul Ackerman and Tom Goodin left the band, as did bassist Todd Eckhardt, who was replaced by Jorge Pezzimenti. Erick Morgan, formerly of the Skunks, took over keys, and Toby Hansen replaced Tom Goodin on guitar.

In late 2001, the Pietasters were recording their next album when they learned that former bassist, Todd Eckhardt, had died of a viral heart infection. The Bouncing Souls included "Todd's Song" on their album Anchor's Away in his memory. The Pietasters released a new album in 2002 entitled Turbo, Eckhardt's nickname. The album caught the attention of James Brown, who asked the Pietasters to be his backing band at a sold-out concert in Washington DC in December 2002.

In 2003, the Pietasters released their live DVD, Live at the 9:30 Club.

In 2006, the Pietasters played the International Ska Circus in Las Vegas.

On August 21, 2007, the Pietasters released a new studio album entitled All Day.

In 2010, the Pietasters performed at the 9:30 Club's 30th anniversary in Washington, D.C., and were introduced by Henry Rollins.

In November 2011, Connecticut's Asbestos Records and Chicago's Underground Communiqué Records launched a fundraiser on Kickstarter to release Oolooloo on vinyl, among other third-wave ska classics from Pilfers, Edna's Goldfish, and Suburban Legends.

On April 20, 2020, the band announced that former keyboard player Erick Morgan had died on April 18 of pneumonia.

== Band members ==
=== Current lineup ===
- Stephen Jackson – vocals
- Joe Ross – guitar
- Rob Steward – drums
- Alan Makranczy – saxophone
- Jeremy Roberts – trombone
- Carlos Linares – trumpet
- Eric Raecke – baritone saxophone
- Dave Vermillion – bass
- Juan Navarro - guitar

=== Past members ===
- Dan Schneider – keyboards
- Toby Hansen – guitar, trumpet
- Talmage Bayer – vocals
- Tom Goodin – guitar
- Pat Kelley – guitar
- Todd Eckhardt – bass (deceased)
- Chris Watt – bass
- Jorge Pezzimenti – bass
- Jon Darby – bass/keyboards
- Ben Gauslin – drums
- Jason Budman – drums
- Chuck Roberts – drums
- Rob French – trombone
- Paul Vesilind – trumpet
- Caroline Boutwell – farfisa
- Paul T. Ackerman – keyboards
- Erick Morgan – keyboards (deceased)
- Jeb Crandall – keyboards
- Dave Pinkert – keyboards
- Jason Trippett – saxophone
- Andrew Guterman – drums
- Curtis Reaves Jr – drums

=== Touring members ===
- Bill Dempsey - keyboards
- Nicholas Bacon - keyboards
- Roy Harter – keyboards
- Vinny Nobile – trombone (Pilfers, Bim Skala Bim)
- Matt Mason – baritone saxophone
- Chris Rhodes – trombone
- Ben Treat – guitar
- Mark “Tarko” Lepusic – bass guitar
- Sammy Kay – guitar

== Discography ==
=== Studio albums ===
- The Pietasters – 1993 on Slug Tone! Records
- Oolooloo – 1995 on Moon Ska Records
- Willis – 1997 on Hellcat Records
- Awesome Mix Tape vol. 6 – 1999 on Hellcat Records
- Turbo – 2002 on Fueled by Ramen
- All Day – 2007 on Indication Records

=== Rare albums, EPs, singles, and others ===
- Recording as "The Dancecrashers" – self-titled – 1992 on Slug Tone! Records
- The Ska-Rumptious 7 Inch – 7" vinylo – 1992 on Slug Tone! Records (4 limited-edition colored vinyl releases including translucent yellow (300 copies), ox blood (300 copies), and translucent orange (300 copies))
- All You Can Eat (6 song cassette) – 1992 on Slug Tone! Records
- The Pietasters (Promo cassette) – 1994 on Slug Tone! Records/Moon Records
- Soul Sammich – 7" black vinyl – 1994 on Slug Tone! Records
- Crazy Monkey Lady b/w Ocean 7 – 7" clear green vinyl – 1996 on Moon Records, 1000 hand numbered
- Strapped Live! (live album) – 1996 on Moon Records
- Comply – full-length CD – released 1996 on Moon Records/Slug Tone! Records (2000 hand signed and consecutively numbered, originally sold in a plastic Ziploc with "extra" goodies)
- Out All Night (Promo cassette) – 1997 on Hellcat Records
- Out All Night (EP) – 1998 on HellCat Records
- Yesterday's Over (Promo cassette) – 1999 on Hellcat Records
- The Pietasters 1992-1996 – multi-CD compilation and unreleased tracks – 2003 on VMS Records
- Live at the 9:30 Club] (DVD) – 2005 on MVD
- Don't Wanna Know EP – 2007 on Indication Records
- Oolooloo – 2012 limited vinyl pressing on Asbestos Records and Underground Communiqué Records
- Live In A Lockdown – 2020 limited vinyl pressing on Revolution Vintage
- Line in the Sand – 2025 single by The Upstarters featuring Steve Jackson

=== Soundtracks ===
- The song "Bitter" (from the album Willis) was featured in the movie Never Been Kissed starring Drew Barrymore.
- The song "Ocean" (from the album Willis) was featured in the movie Molly starring Elisabeth Shue.
- Warren Miller's Snowriders 2 soundtrack – 1997
- The song "Out All Night" appears on the 1998 PlayStation game Street SK8ER.
- The song "Out All Night" is heard in Season one, episode one of the 2019 Amazon Prime series The Feed
- The song "Told You the First Time" appears on the 2003 Xbox game Project Gotham Racing 2
- NCAA Football 2006 (game menu and minigame soundtrack)
