= All Day Long: A Portrait of Britain at Work =

- Author: Joanna Biggs
- Language: English
- Genre: non-fiction
- Publisher: Serpent's Tail
- Publication date: 2015
- Publication place: UK
- ISBN: 978-1781251874

All Day Long: A Portrait of Britain at Work is a book by Joanna Biggs first published in April 2015. Biggs toured Britain, interviewing 32 people in different jobs and wrote about each to paint a picture of modern working life. Writing in The Guardian, Andy Beckett described it as a "beautifully observed set of case studies" which illustrate the author's contention that work in Britain has changed since the 2008 debt crisis and the idea that good work brings a good life no longer holds. Yasmin Alibhai-Brown in The Independent describes it as a "devastating study of why capitalism isn't working".
