= John Alday =

John Alday (fl. 1570), was an English translator of semi-philosophical and classical works in the reign of Queen Elizabeth I. He was described by Thomas Tanner as a resident of London.

== Works ==
The book by which Alday is chiefly known is an English version of two French pamphlets, published in 1558, and it bears the title: ‘Theatrum Mundi, the Theatre or rule of the worlde, wherein may be sene the running race and course of every mans life, as touching miserie and felicity, wherein be contained wonderful examples and learned deuises to the ouerthrowe of vice and exalting of vertue. Whereunto is added a learned and maruellous worke of the excellencie of mankinde. Written in the French and Latin tongues by Peter Boaystuau (i.e., Pierre Boaistuau, surnamed Launay), and translated into English by John Alday.’ London, H. D. for Thomas Hacket, 16mo. The book was dedicated to Sir William Chester, alderman of London, and verses in its praise appear on the back of the title-page. It is undated, but, having been licensed towards the end of 1566 (Arber's Transcript of the Stationers' Register, i.366), the translation was probably published early in the next year. The work contains several pieces of verse, and on their account Joseph Ritson numbered Alday among the English poets of the sixteenth century (Bibliographia Poetica, p. 114). The longest piece is entitled ‘A complaint of the pore husbandmen in meter.’ A second edition of the work appeared in 1574, printed by H. Bynneman for Thomas Hacket. From his address to the reader there, we gather that Alday claimed to be the first to use the word theatre in an English book, or to introduce into England the simile comparing human life to the stage. A third edition of the work was published in 1581, and there it was stated that John Alday had ‘perused, corrected, and amended’ the English rendering, ‘the old translation being corrupted.’ The latter part of the book—‘Of the Excellencie of Mankinde’—is frequently referred to by Robert Burton in his Anatomy of Melancholie. A new English translation of the whole work, by Francis Farrer, merchant, was published in 1663.

An English version of a French summary of Pliny's ‘History,’ which was licensed in July 1566 (Arber's Stationers' Register, i.314), is also ascribed to Alday. Its full title runs: ‘A summarie of the Antiquities and wonders of the worlde, abstracted out of the sixtene first bookes of the excellente Historiographer Plinie, wherein may be sene the wonderfull workes of God in his creatures, translated out of French into English by I. A. Imprinted at London by Henry Denham for Thomas Hacket.’ 8vo. A copy of this rare work is in the Grenville Library. A translation of another French treatise from Alday's pen was printed by Thomas East for William Ponsonby in 1579; it bears the title, ‘Praise and Dispraise of Women: Gathered out of sundrye Authors, as well Sacred as Prophane, with plentee of wonderfull examples, whereoff some are rare and not heard off before, as by the principall notes in the Margent may appeare. Written in the French tongue, and brought into our vulgar by John Allday,’ London, 1579, 8vo.
