= List of ska musicians =

This is a list of notable bands and musicians who performed primarily ska or ska-influenced music for a significant portion of their careers.

== Original (starting in late 1950s) ==
- Aubrey Adams
- Laurel Aitken
- Roland Alphonso
- Theophilus Beckford
- Val Bennett
- Ken Boothe
- Baba Brooks
- The Blues Busters
- Prince Buster
- The Clarendonians
- Jimmy Cliff
- Clue J & His Blues Blasters
- Stranger Cole
- Desmond Dekker
- Coxsone Dodd
- Don Drummond
- Jackie Edwards
- Alton Ellis
- The Ethiopians
- Owen Gray
- Derrick Harriott
- Justin Hinds
- Jah Jerry Haynes
- Lloyd Knibb
- Byron Lee & the Dragonaires
- Count Machuki
- Carlos Malcolm
- Tommy McCook
- The Melodians
- Johnny "Dizzy" Moore
- Derrick Morgan
- Eric "Monty" Morris
- Jackie Opel
- The Paragons
- Lee "Scratch" Perry
- Lord Tanamo
- The Pioneers
- Ernest Ranglin
- Rico Rodriguez
- The Skatalites
- The Silvertones
- Millie Small
- Symarip
- Lynn Taitt
- Toots & the Maytals
- The Wailers
- Delroy Wilson

== 2 Tone ska revival (starting in late 1970s) ==
- Akrylykz
- The Apollinaires
- Pauline Black
- Bad Manners
- Mike Barson
- The Beat/The English Beat
- Mark Bedford
- Buster Bloodvessel
- The Bodysnatchers
- John Bradbury
- Andy Cox
- Rhoda Dakar
- Jerry Dammers
- Judge Dread
- Chris Foreman
- Lynval Golding
- Terry Hall
- Madness
- Everett Morton
- Horace Panter
- Roddy Radiation
- Ranking Roger
- The Selecter
- Chas Smash
- The Specials
- Neville Staple
- Suggs
- Lee Thompson
- Dave Wakeling
- Daniel Woodgate

== Third wave ska (starting in early 1980s) ==
- Against All Authority
- Allniters
- Animal Chin
- The Aquabats
- Area-7
- The Arrogant Sons of Bitches
- Athena
- BeNuts
- Blue Meanies
- Big D and the Kids Table
- Bim Skala Bim
- The Bruce Lee Band
- Buck-O-Nine
- Catch 22
- Cherry Poppin' Daddies
- The Chinkees
- Choking Victim
- Chris Murray
- Citizen Fish
- Common Rider
- The Crazy 8s
- Dance Hall Crashers
- Deal's Gone Bad
- Desorden Publico
- Distemper
- Doe Maar
- Downfall
- Edna's Goldfish
- The Expendables
- Falling Sickness
- Farse
- Fishbone
- Five Iron Frenzy
- Fuzigish
- The Gadjits
- Gals Panic
- Go Jimmy Go
- GOGO13
- Goldfinger
- Hepcat
- The Hippos
- The Hooters
- The Hotknives
- The Impossibles
- Inspecter 7
- The Insyderz
- Jeffries Fan Club
- Johnny Socko
- Kemuri
- King Apparatus
- The Kingpins
- The Know How
- Lightyear
- Leftöver Crack
- Less Than Jake
- Let's Go Bowling
- Link 80
- Long Shot Party
- Los Fabulosos Cadillacs
- Mad Caddies
- Mark Foggo's Skasters
- Mealticket
- Me Mom and Morgentaler
- Mephiskapheles
- The Mighty Mighty Bosstones
- Monkey
- Mr. Review
- MU330
- Mustard Plug
- No Doubt
- The O.C. Supertones
- Operation Ivy
- Panteón Rococó
- The Pietasters
- Pilfers
- The Planet Smashers
- The Porkers
- Potshot
- Pressure Cooker
- Rancid
- Reel Big Fish
- The Rough Kutz
- Ruder Than You
- The Rudiments
- Rx Bandits
- Save Ferris
- The Scofflaws
- The Siren Six!
- Ska-P
- Skankin' Pickle
- Skavoovie and the Epitones
- Skinnerbox
- The Skoidats
- The Skunks
- The Slackers
- Slapstick
- Slow Gherkin
- Spunge
- Spring Heeled Jack
- Stubborn All-Stars
- Subb
- Sublime
- Suburban Legends
- Suburban Rhythm
- The Suicide Machines
- Superhiks
- The Toasters
- Tokyo Ska Paradise Orchestra
- The Uptones
- The Untouchables
- Tijuana No!
- Voodoo Glow Skulls

== Post-third wave (starting in early 2000s) ==
- Bandits of the Acoustic Revolution
- Beebs and Her Money Makers
- Bomb The Music Industry!
- The Brass Action
- Capdown
- Catbite
- The Cat Empire
- Chase Long Beach
- En Tol Sarmiento
- The Flatliners
- Folly
- The Forces of Evil
- Gollbetty
- Howards Alias
- Hub City Stompers
- Imperial Leisure
- The Interrupters
- I Voted for Kodos
- Jeff Rosenstock
- The Johnstones
- The King Blues
- King Prawn
- Kingston Rudieska
- Lightyear
- Locomondo
- The Locos
- Murphy's Kids
- No Torso
- Oreskaband
- The Orobians
- Pannonia Allstars Ska Orchestra
- Random Hand
- RedSka
- Rude King
- Russkaja
- The Rudimentals
- Ska Cubano
- The Skints
- Slightly Stoopid
- Sonic Boom Six
- Sounds Like Chicken
- Starpool
- Streetlight Manifesto
- The Supervillains
- Talco
- The Unlimiters
- The Upgrades
- Westbound Train
- We Are the Union
