= Ska Weekend =

Music festival in Knoxville, Tennessee

Ska Weekend is a music festival in Knoxville, TN, United States, that began in 2003 with only a few bands and has grown to be one of the largest gatherings of ska musicians in the country.

== Popularity ==
The festival is touted as the largest ska festival in the country by its organizer Ben Altom. The event usually takes place during the spring, but the two most recent festivals have been moved to Summer (Ska Weekend 2008 was July 19) The Event draws some of the most popular ska, punk and rocksteady bands in Northern America (The Planet Smashers, The Know How, mu330, Catch 22, Go Jimmy Go, Mustard Plug, Royal City Riot, SGR, High School Football Heroes, Last Martyrs of a Lost Cause, The Taj Motel Trio, 50:50 Shot and Perfect Orange have all played at the festival) it also routinely attracts more than 1,000 people.

== History ==
Ben Altom held first Ska Weekend at Brick Yard Blues restaurant in Powell, TN in 2003. There were only about five bands there. All of those bands were friends of Ben's that he met while touring with Perfect Orange, the ska band Ben played with while in college. In order to provide more space the next year it moved to Market Square in Knoxville's downtown. Since 2005 the festival had been held in Knoxville's historic Old City. In 2008, Ska Weekend moved to World's Fair Park in Knoxville where the 1982 World's Fair was held.

Ska Weekend also teamed up with Second Harvest in 2004 and turned the show into a charity and requests everyone to bring 5 cans of food to donate, along with admission. Proceeds from the show go to help Second Harvest Food Bank of East Tennessee.

=== Ska Weekend 2008 Bands ===
- 50:50 Shot
- In The Face
- The Disregardables
- Bigger Thomas
- Murphy's Kids
- Stuck Lucky
- Fatter Than Albert
- Stereohype
- Hub City Stompers
- Royal City Riot
- Chase Long Beach
- The Taj Motel Trio
- The Hits
- Aka Rudie
- Matt Wixson
- Mad-E Ruthless
- 7 Step Drop
- Green Room Rockers
- Marx Revolution
- The Hoodingys

=== Ska Weekend 2007 Bands ===
- Mustard Plug
- Voodoo Glow Skulls
- The Slackers
- Westbound Train
- Deal's Gone Bad
- Manic Sewing Circle
- King Django
- Mile 21
- The Hits
- Monkey
- Royal City Riot
- Fatter Than Albert
- Natti Love Joys
- Dr. Ring-Ding
- Case Of The Mondays
- Shakedown
- Stuck Lucky
- The Pietasters
- We Are the Union
- In The Face
- Last Martyrs of a Lost Cause
- Eastern Standard Time
- Fat Penguin
- Steadfast United
- Siafu*

*The final band selected by fans voting on the festival's website.

== Organization ==
In 2003 and 2004 the festival had only one stage, but since 2005 there have been four stages. Bands are scheduled to play 30-minute sets. There is a 15-minute delay between each stage's start time, which means that at least two bands are playing at all times while the other two stages are being set up.
