= Australian ska =

Music genre since the mid-1980s

The Australian ska scene has existed since the mid-1980s, when it started enjoying the same sort of interest as it did in the United Kingdom, following the success of UK 2 Tone bands such as the Specials, the Beat and Madness.

== Beginnings ==
The first Australian ska band was Adelaide-based band the Jumpers, which formed in 1979. Other early Australian ska bands included Naughty Rhythms (originating in Canberra), Sydney bands Allniters, the Hangovers and Itchy Feet (led by vocalist Tim Freedman, who went on to form the commercially successful band The Whitlams) and Melbourne bands Strange Tenants, No Nonsense and Loonee Tunes. The Allniters and No Nonsense both gained Australian chart success.

Other ska bands in Australia included the Letters, formed in Melbourne in 1979, featuring founding member of Strange Tenants, John Holmes with Les Toft, Shane Whiteside and Mark Egerton; and Melbourne band, Noisy Neighbours. Both bands played in most main independent venues in Melbourne, often together. Melbourne band No Nonsense emerged from an early ska band called Dicky Moron and the Rude Boys, which had a name change from Dicky Moron and the Four Skins. Both bands were fronted by lead singer Richard Bruce. Using band members's recollections, a Premier Artists running sheet, newspaper gig guide advertising, it can be stated with confidence that No Nonsense's first gig was supporting Melbourne band Alice and the Alligators at the Turf Club Hotel, Ararat on Saturday 17 October 1981. Strange Tenants first gig was on the 7th November 1981 at Lygon street Festa, Carlton. Loonee Tunes formed soon after in 1982.

In 1987, the Newcastle-based band the Pork Hunts appeared on the scene, soon changing their name to the Porkers. They spent more than 20 years touring and recording, the most recent of which, This is The Porkers, was released in 2007.

More recent notable bands include Mad Not Madness, Area 7, Sounds Like Chicken, the Resignators, and the Mouldy Lovers. Bands such as the Cat Empire have mixed ska with other genres such as jazz and calypso.

There are regular ska and radio shows on the independent Brisbane radio station 4ZZZ.

== Melbourne ska scene ==
=== 1980s ===
In November 1981, the Strange Tenants played their first ever gig at the Lygon St Festival. Tours around Australia and support gigs with overseas touring bands like UB40, U2 and the Style Council helped broaden their appeal outside the ska scene. The main venues in the early 1980s Melbourne ska scene were the Aberdeen Hotel (an old hotel in Fitzroy later to be renamed the Loaded Dog), the Bat Cave (a small mod-oriented venue in Richmond), the Greyhound Hotel (Richmond) and The Chevron Hotel. A pivotal figure in the Melbourne ska scene was 'Aunty' Carol Baxter who, in the early days, managed both Strange Tenants and No Nonsense and booked and promoted all the bands at the Aberdeen Hotel. As the ska bands of the eighties were playing the style of UK bands The Specials, Madness and The Beat, a style known as Two Tone it was this brand of ska that was introduced to Australian audiences. Australian bands quickly developed strong followings that could support many ska bands with No Nonsense and Loonee Tunes often working five nights a week.

=== 1990s ===
In the mid-1990s, the Melbourne ska scene was mostly dormant. The few gigs were from bands such as Loin Groin, Slyboots, Area 7 and Yeah Yeah. Ska had always attracted skinheads but by the mid-1990s an element of this subculture's propensity to violence resulted in fights and injuries, causing crowd numbers to drop. Many venues refused to book ska bands, including the Royal Artillery in North Melbourne and the Albert Park Hotel. Yeah Yeah changed its style to a blend of ska and rockabilly in order to keep playing.

However, towards the end of the decade the momentum started to build on the back of the oi-punk resurgence. New bands started appearing, such as Oiska, Addiction 64, Shelflife, Ringleader, Cheese Excursion and Commissioner Gordon. The late 1990s also saw the creation of the Australian Ska Orchestra, an idea by Loin Groin's trumpeter Julian Millie. In 2003, The Melbourne Ska Orchestra (MSO) was created by Nicky Bomba and radio presenter Mohair Slim, a collection of musicians from local ska bands which still operates in this way with Nicky Bomba now leading the band, which includes two original members from the Australian Ska Orchestra. The Melbourne Ska Orchestra was important to Melbourne ska audiences as this was the first band to introduce the earlier forms of ska by the likes of Don Drummond and the Skatalites, which was to make a lasting impression on audiences. Sydney band Club Ska had exposed Melbourne audiences to the earlier form of ska in the late 1980s at the Armadale hotel, but there had been no Melbourne ska bands playing the earlier styles to continue the exposure. The late 1990s also saw the emergence of Area-7, led by John Stevens, who had been lead singer of Yeah Yeah.

=== 2000s ===
The momentum continued with additional bands springing up, like Hectic, Skazz, 99% Fat, Trojan Horns, Redsand Shuffle, Mr Coffee, User Friendly and The Incredible Dead Goons. Gigs were regular and well attended. Most of the musicians and audience were born from 1980 to 1985. Although the scene developed into a size which could exist in its own right, there was still crossover with the local punk scene. The most popular bands in this time were Commissioner Gordon, 99% Fat, Sounds Like Chicken and Area 7 (although by this stage Area 7 had become a "national band" with strong airplay on Triple M, so they were partly isolated from the "local scene").

On the first Thursday of every month, the "Ska Bar", ironically held at The Arthouse in North Melbourne, which is the Royal Artillery that had refused to book ska bands in the 1990s, was held from 1999 to 2004. This became an institution and was the foundation for the scene, and its end in 2004 was reflective of a scene in decline. Every year, the Melbourne International Skafest was held at the Corner Hotel, an event which eventually morphed into the annual gig for the Melbourne Ska Orchestra with an international guest. Venues where ska gigs were commonly held were The Arthouse, The Tote, The Punters Club, The Corner Hotel, 9th Ward and The Evelyn. The scene was also supported by a weekly radio show called Skankin' Downunder on the community radio station, Plenty Valley FM.

Ska bands from interstate made appearances at local shows, including The Porkers (Newcastle), The Seen (Adelaide), The Lyrical Madmen (Sydney) and Wiseacre (Brisbane). Many international ska bands played shows in Melbourne during this era, such as The Mighty Mighty Bosstones, Reel Big Fish, Blukilla, Less Than Jake, Goldfinger, The Special Beat, The Skatalites and Bad Manners.

In May 2003, the Melbourne Ska Orchestra played its inaugural concert at The Esplanade Hotel's Gershwin Room (St Kilda). The band has played at several major festivals including Bluesfest Byron Bay 2011, 2012, 2013. In 2014 the MSO toured the UK playing Glastonbury before touring Canada playing in Montreal.

Around 2004 when many of the bands of the previous five years began breaking up, it seemed the scene would continue to prosper due to the healthy number of new bands appearing, such as The Ska Vendors, The Knockabouts, Sounds Like Chicken, Payoff, The Beefeaters, The Moonhops, The Vaginals and The Resignators. However, audiences were shrinking so the scene went into decline, with gigs only held occasionally. Despite this trend, the annual Ska Nation weekend of events was started and Commissioner Gordon played annual reunion gigs.

=== 2010s ===
For a while, most of the ska shows featured bands playing a retro style (e.g. 2 Tone, 1980s). However, there are still some bands looking to develop a unique style. As of 2011, Melbourne bands known to still be active include The Ska Vendors, Loonee Tunes, The Kujo Kings, Johnny Longshot, Live@Subs, Area-7, The Resignators, The Bennies, Lee & The Hartneys, The Operators, and Menage A Ska.

Since its beginnings, Melbourne's ska scene has never really died and is once again experiencing a big resurgence.

The Melbourne Ska Orchestra is bringing ska to a wider audience by appearing on the ABC's television show Spicks and Specks and ABC radio. The MSO was also nominated in 2013 for two ARIA awards: engineer of the year and best blues and roots album. In 2016 they won the ARIA award for Best World Music Album for their second full-length release Sierra-Kilo-Alpha which also included 3D artwork (with glasses supplied).

In early 2012 while playing a Jamaican ska tune on his 3PBS radio show, Bluejuice, music historian Mohair Slim received a phone call from Lowell Morris from Camberwell saying he had played drums on that track. This led to the discovery that Melbourne musicians Dennis Sindrey and Peter Stoddart, along with Lowell were part of the in-house band at Studio One playing as the Caribs where the first ska recordings were made. Australian ska history could now be tracked back to Jamaica to the development of ska. Following this discovery, in October 2013 Multicultural Arts Victoria organised Melbourne Festival's event Melbourne's Celebration of Ska held over two nights on the banks of the Yarra river. The bands playing were the Ska Vendors, Strange Tenants and the Caribs. The shows were called 10,30,50 in recognition of the bands' contribution to Melbourne ska: the Ska Vendors have been together for 10 years, Strange Tenants for 30 and the Caribs for 50.

As of 2018, Melbourne had many ska bands playing, including the original 80s bands, Strange Tenants, Loonee Tunes and No Nonsense who make sporadic appearances. Other ska bands playing at the time included Shanty Town, Ska Vendors, the Melbourne Ska Orchestra, Menage a ska, Johnny Longshot, Judge Pino and the ruling Motions, the Melbourne City Ska Collective, Bustamento, Area7, and the Resignators.

As well as Mohair Slim's Blue Juice show on 106.7 PBS FM, 88.3 Southern FM has an all-ska show on every Tuesday night (Wednesday morning) from midnight until 2am called The Ska Show with Beefy. After a couple of years on air The Ska Show with Beefy is widely regarded as one of the premier Ska Shows in the World, being used by Ska and Ska-Punk bands from everywhere as their show of choice to launch their new music.

=== 2020s ===
As of 2025, bands currently in the ska scene in Melbourne include Area-7, The Kittyhawks, Admiral Ackbar's Dishonourable Discharge, The Pirateska Rebellion, Loonee Tunes, The Resignators, The Melbourne Ska Orchestra and Loin Groin.

== NSW - Sydney/Newcastle/Canberra Ska Scene ==
=== 1980s ===
The 1980s was the most prolific time for ska in Sydney, not just for bands, but for the Ska loving Rude boy and Skinhead cultures. One of the earliest and most successful, in terms of Mainstream success was a sydney Band called The Allniters. The Allniters were a ska band, starting off playing in inner city pubs in 1980, with their first gig at the Sussex Hotel, at the time, the centre of the 1980s Mod revival. The Mod revival was going strong in Sydney, and there was some support for Ska from the Mods. The Allniters went on to have mainstream success with a number of singles getting on to the Australian top 40, including Montego Bay, Hold On and Love and Affection. Other bands in the 1980s were The Leftovers, The Hangovers. No Nonsense and the Bystanders. These bands played gigs, largely at inner city venues, supported by rude boys, skinheads and ska fans. Club Ska formed in 1987, being composed of four members from the Allniters. The Porkers formed in 1987 with some success, touring throughout Australia and supporting big name overseas acts on their Australian tours. Canberra's main contribution, Naughty Rhythms, formed in this era had continued on and has largely continued to this day.

On August 25&26 1989 the Sydney Ska fest had a collection of a lot of the local Ska bands including the Allniters, the Hangovers, The Pork Hunts (now known as the Porkers), F Troop, Club Ska, the Latenotes, The Mad Hatters, Na Hoom, the Allsorts at the Teachers Club (in Sydney’s CBD and at Selina’s (Coogee Bay Hotel).

=== 1990s ===
By the 1990s the Ska subculture, Skinhead and mod scenes were starting to diminish, with the gradual rise of electronic dance music. By the 1990s, many Sydney Ska bands had disappeared. The Porkers continued gigging through this time, but many other bands broke up, with the scenes that supported them diminishing. One of the new bands to arise in Sydney in the 1990s was Backy Skank, with their debut album launched in 1997.

=== Late 1990s - Early 2000s ===
Following the Ska revival in the US The Porkers and The Allniters continued playing gigs and released new material between 1998 and 2001. Dr Raju formed as an offshoot of the 80s group Off The Shelf releasing 2 CDs in 1996 & 1998. Backy Skank also played regular gigs and released albums. Other band of the era with less traction included The Lyrical Madmen, The Mad Dash, Little More Than You, Rubix Cuba, and Halfdave.

=== 2010s ===
The 2010s saw the formation of the Ozskas, a new band from Western Sydney. Bands originally formed in the 1980s, including The Allniters and Naughty Rhythms continued to play. The Allniters reformed with a new lead singer and a few line up changes, for intermittent tours.

=== Sound System Records ===
Formed by Pete Cooper of The Porkers primarily as a way to release music by The Porkers Sound System also distributed by other Australian bands and some international acts. Importantly for Australian Ska music they released Ska Skank Down Under - Vol 1, which was a compilation of Australian Ska Bands from 1980 to 1990. And Ska Skank Down Under - Vol 2, with Australian Ska bands from 1990 until 2000.

== See also ==
- Music of Australia
