= SGR (band) =

- Origin: Voorhees, New Jersey, United States
- Genres: Ska, Ska-core, Rock
- Years active: 1996–2005
- Labels: Sonance

SGR was an American ska-core band from Voorhees, New Jersey, United States, that formed as a five-piece act in 1996, during the United States third-wave ska boom. The band's catalog spans four albums (one released on cassette, three others on compact disc), a live recording, and a handful of compilation appearances. The band's last live show took place in June 2007.

== History ==
The first incarnations of SGR can be traced back to two local southern New Jersey bands during the mid-1990s: Hammonton, New Jersey ska mainstays, The Havoctones, and Voorhees, New Jersey alternative rock band, FLOS. Following the breakups of these bands, SGR's members began performing together during the winter of 1996. New members continued to join the band for the next year until it became a thriving eight-piece. In the spring of 1997, SGR recorded For the Crazy Indian. The eight-song EP was recorded at Milkboy Recording Studio in Philadelphia, and released on cassette to positive acclaim from the already well-established southern New Jersey and Philadelphia, PA ska scenes.

After two years of frequent local touring, SGR entered Milkboy Studios in 1999 for a second time to record Livin' the Good Life, a full-length CD that established the band's unique skacore-influenced sound. Many compared the EP to The Mighty Mighty Bosstones' classic "Question the Answers," and tracks from the release received frequent airplay on 94.1 WYSP's Loud-n-Local Sunday night radio program, then hosted by Mel Toxic. In this same year, SGR began opening frequently for larger ska acts such as Save Ferris, The Urge, Mephiskapheles, and Reel Big Fish.

In 2001 the band signed with independent Philadelphia label, Sonance Records to release two albums. The first, The Tenby Chase, was released on May 19, 2002, at The Trocadero in Philadelphia, PA. Three months after the album's release, lead singer Frankie C left the band, and was replaced by Matt Skoufalos. The addition of Skoufalos continued the band's trend toward a mellower, more mature, soulful reggae/rock sound, which was met with much controversy among the band's fans.

For the next two years SGR raised its regional profile by touring the northeast, midwest, and southern regions of the United States, opening for ska-influenced bands like Catch 22, Streetlight Manifesto, The Pietasters, and The Toasters. Also during that time the band released its final effort on Sonance Records, an 8-song live album, Live at The Troc, and organized a large free outdoor concert/voter registration drive called "Rock and Register" at Jack Curtis Stadium in Pennsauken, New Jersey's Cooper River Park in June 2004.

In many ways, 2005 proved to be the high water mark for the group. SGR independently released its fourth album, Atomic Pony, to rave reviews during the spring, and then supported it with an ambitious touring schedule throughout the United States and Canada, performing at a number of high-profile regional ska/reggae festivals that year including the Victoria Ska Festival, 3 Floors of Ska, the Ontario Ska Festival, and Ska Weekend. In addition, SGR was featured in September 2005's Ska Is Dead 3 tour. Shortly after in October of that year the band played its final show at Cafe Metropolis in Wilkes-Barre, PA.

== Reunion show ==
On May 10, 2007, the band posted a blog on its Myspace site confirming rumors of an upcoming reunion show. The show took place on June 1, 2007, at The 449 Room in Trenton, New Jersey. That night, former lead singer Frankie C performed on stage with the band for the first time in almost five years.

== Band members ==
Reunion show lineup:

- Jeff "Lance" Hanna rhythm guitar
- Jon Butts - bass guitar
- Larry Butts - trumpet
- Bryan Havoc - saxophone
- Dave Hunter - baritone horn
- Sean Hur - guitar, keyboard
- Chris Lucca - trumpet
- Dave Rossi - drums
- Pete Silipino - trombone
- Frankie C - vocals

Final lineup:

- Jeff Hanna - rhythm guitar
- Jon Butts - bass guitar
- Bryan Havoc - saxophone
- Dave Hunter - baritone horn
- Sean Hur - guitar, keyboard
- Chris Lucca - trumpet
- Dave Rossi - drums
- Matt Skoufalos - vocals

Former members:

- Larry Butts - trumpet
- John Cappuchio - guitar, saxophone
- Frank Conicella - vocals
- Jeff Cressman - guitar
- Eric Schwank - bass guitar
- Peter Silipino - trombone
- Johnny Smile - guitar
- Paul Strande - trumpet
- Sean Vernon - vocals
- William Valloreo - vocals

Roadie

- OOCH

== Discography ==
- For The Crazy Indian (1997)
- Livin' The Good Life (1999)
- The Tenby Chase (2002)
- Live at The Troc (2003)
- Atomic Pony (2005)
