= Perfect Orange =

Perfect Orange was a third-wave ska band from Knoxville, Tennessee. They formed in 2002 and disbanded in 2005.

The group never gained large national attention, although they did tour the nation three times playing small clubs and releasing independent albums. Altom was responsible for starting Ska Weekend, the largest ska festival in the country. It is an annual tradition, taking place in Knoxville each April (Though this recent years event took place in August, and might continue the same relative date.)

== Band members ==
- Zac "Tater" Johnson - guitar, lead vocals
- "Big" Ben Altom - trumpet, backing vocals
- Travis "Gordo" Gordon - tenor saxophone
- Brett Smith - bass guitar
- Doug "32a" Griffey - drums
- Doug Brown - bass guitar
- Mike Agentis - bass
- Ryan Lambert - drums
- Doug "32a" Griffey - trombone
- Chase Campbell - saxophone

== Discography ==
- Live at 228 (2002)
- Garage Demo (2003)
- PO Live (2003)
- Extra Pulp (2003)
- Extra Pulp Special Edition (2003)
- Live at CBGB (2004)
- To The Rescue (2004)
- This Is Only A Test (2004)
