= New Shoes (disambiguation) =

New Shoes is a song by Paolo Nutini.

New Shoes may also refer to:

== TV ==
- "New Shoes", an episode of Tots TV
- "The New Shoes", an episode of King Rollo

== Music ==
- New Shoes Records, Diana Jones (singer-songwriter) and other artists
- "New Shoes", a 1984 song by The Bus Boys, Brian O'Neal
- "New Shoes", a 1980 song by Mark Foggo and The Secret Meeting, M. Foggo
- "New Shoes", a 1960 song by Pearl Bailey, Chandler
- "New Shoes", a song by Guy Sigsworth

== See also ==
- Nu Shooz, American band
