= Suburban Rhythm =

American ska punk band

Suburban Rhythm was a ska punk band from Long Beach, California. Formed in 1990, they played numerous shows in small-venue clubs with many now famous O.C. bands opening their performances, including Sublime, No Doubt, and Reel Big Fish. Suburban Rhythm met with various roster changes and broke up in 1994. Three years later in 1997 their only full-length album, Suburban Rhythm was released.

== History ==
In August 1989, vocalist Dennis Owens, guitarist Jake Kline, keyboardist/vocalist Rodi Delgadillo, bassist Deryke Cardenaz, and drummer Christine Tasche formed a band called The Silent Invasion, which played one show shortly before Tasche left the band. The remaining members decided to change the band's name to Suburban Rhythm; Ed Kampwirth replaced Cardenaz on bass while Carlos de la Garza, drummer for Cerritos ska band The Trenchtown Invaders, filled the band's drum slot.

=== Height of career ===
With Kampwirth and De la Garza forming a solid rhythm section, the band played numerous shows including Prince's club "Glam Slam", in Los Angeles, also playing Long Beach and Orange County areas. In October 1992, the band released their first (and only) demo, Hose.

In April 1993, Kline quit the band to work on his own musical project, Eggbeater. The band decided to find a new guitarist but vowed to break up if any more core members (including Kampwirth and De La Garza) decided to quit, fearing replacing any more members might "water things down to the point of embarrassment". After several try-outs, including Reel Big Fish founder Aaron Barrett, the band chose Nuckle Brothers guitarist Scott Moran.

=== Breakup ===
In late 1993 Suburban Rhythm started to record their first album. Friction among band members grew worse and in the middle of the sessions Kampwirth and Moran announced they were quitting. The band kept the promise they made after Kline left and played their last show on April 2, 1994 in Costa Mesa, CA. The band released the "Almost There" ep at the time of their breakup, containing 4 songs from the scrapped album.

=== Compilation ===
In 1997, a posthumous 16-song compilation CD was released by Long Beach record label Solid Recordings. The album contains three tracks from the Hose demo cassette, all four tracks from the Almost There 7" vinyl, nine previously unreleased tracks from the scrapped first album, five live tracks recorded at the Big Black Room in Santa Ana, California in 1993, as well as a hidden garage-recorded track entitled "Uniform of Destruction".

The CD also features liner notes written by No Doubt guitarist Tom Dumont.

== Musical style ==
While primarily labeled a ska/punk band, some of their recordings displayed styles from funk (e.g. "18 Inch Ruler"), to metal, jazz, blues, prog, and even country (e.g. "Blue Hawaii").

== Influence and legacy ==
Shortly after Suburban Rhythm's break-up, a large number of the band's contemporaries would go on to find success, and this would, in part, lead to a nationwide ska revival in the mid and late 1990s. Additionally, a large number of younger Orange County ska bands had cited Suburban Rhythm as an influence, most notably, O.C. ska band Reel Big Fish has paid homage to Suburban Rhythm on many occasions. Their second full-length CD, Turn the Radio Off, includes a tribute song to Suburban Rhythm entitled "S.R". They also covered Suburban Rhythm's "Uniform of Destruction" for the Ska Parade's compilation album, Runnin' Naked thru the Cornfield. (Suburban Rhythm's "Coming out of the Woodwork" is featured on the same album.) Reel Big Fish's front man, Aaron Barrett, paid further homage to Suburban Rhythm by covering one of their unreleased songs, Go to Hell, with his side band The Forces of Evil, which was released on the album Friend or Foe?.

Suburban Rhythm were cited by the L.A. Weekly as one of the 10 best bands from Long Beach, Ca.

Various members of Suburban Rhythm have gone on to play in numerous bands, and are still active in the Long Beach, Orange County and Los Angeles musical communities.

Owens, de la Garza, and Delgadillo, would go on to form the power-pop group Action League which performed from 1995-1999.

Dennis Owens played bass with BlowUpBlow and later played bass with Free Moral Agents. Owens also DJs in various clubs in Long Beach and Orange County, notably at the long-running Good Foot that Owens and Delgadillio founded in 1998.

Rodi Delgadillo currently lives in Long Beach, California. He Dj's and is currently working on a new musical project named "Cosmos".

Carlos de la Garza would go on to play drums with Reel Big Fish, Gogogo Airheart, Sugarcult, The Valley Arena, Lyra, and Ray Barbee, and currently runs Music Friends recording studio, and is a Grammy Winning recording engineer and producer.

Ed Kampwirth continued playing bass, keys, and writing for numerous acts. Most notable within the Ska/Reggae/Punk genre: Toured with Reel Big Fish -1999 (temporary bass sub for Matt Wong). Co-writing credit for "Mistaken" by Save Ferris -1999 (Modified album). Toured and wrote songs with Neville Staple (ex. The Specials) - 2000-2004. Played keys with the Alleged Gunmen - 2002-2004 (album- Return to Zero -2004). Currently touring/writing with the Long Beach Dub Allstars (2016–present).

Jake Kline shortly fronted a band called Eggbeater, but is no longer involved in playing music.

Scott Moran would later play guitar with The Aquabats, skate-legend Ray Barbee's instrumental ensemble, and currently plays guitar in Sky Parade. Moran is also currently involved in martial arts.

== Members ==
- Dennis Owens (vocals)
- Rodi DelGadillo (keyboard)
- Deryke Cardenaz (bass guitar) (1990–1992)
- Ed Kampwirth (bass guitar) (1992–1994)
- Jake Kline (guitar) (1990–1993)
- Scott Moran (guitar) (1993–1994)
- Christine Tasche (drums) (1990, with The Silent Invasion)
- John Gamba (drums) (1990–1991)
- Carlos de la Garza (drums) (1991–1994)

== Discography ==
Year	Title	Format	Details
1992	Trojan Tape	Cassette	Unreleased demo tape
1992	Hose	Cassette	Out of print
1994	Almost There	7″ Vinyl	Out of print
1997	Suburban Rhythm	CD	16-song compilation released through Solid Recordings - Out Of Print
