= Pannonia Allstars Ska Orchestra =

Hungarian SKA band

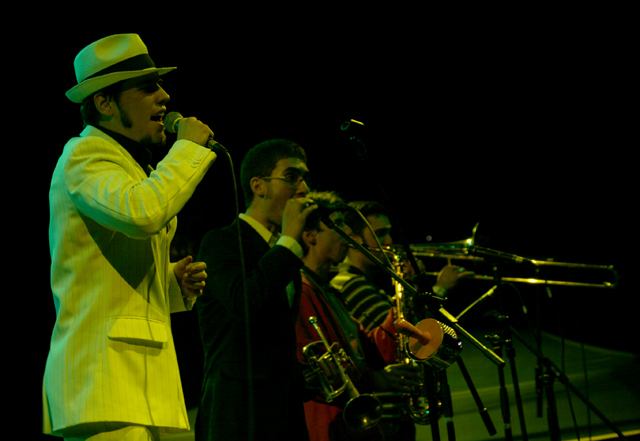
- PASO performing at LB27 Reggae Camp 2008

Background information
- Also known as: PASO
- Origin: Budapest, Hungary
- Genres: Ska, reggae, dub, dancehall
- Years active: 2003–present
- Labels: Crossroads (2003–2005); Megalith (2005–present); Megadó Kiadó (2009–present)
- Members: Kristóf "KRSA" Tóth (Lord Panamo); Aron Koós-Hutás; Mr. Vajay; Luki; Tomi; Mr.P; Laca; Csakikapitany; Dr. Strict; Lipi Brown; Barna György
- Past members: Tony Ass; Ádám Ignácz
- Website: http://www.paso.hu/

Pannonia Allstars Ska Orchestra are a Hungarian ska band formed in Budapest, in 2003. The band's musical style has fused Jamaican-style ska and reggae with jazz melodies and elements of traditional Hungarian folk music.

After their first demo in 2003 they have released four studio albums on Megalith Records and one live album on Crossroads Records. The band have toured extensively around Continental Europe and regularly play the Sziget Festival, where they played on the main stage in 2008.

The band members also run several side projects, such as PASO Soundsystem (ska DJ set) and PASO's Roots Rockers (dub and reggae live band set). They also present a weekly ska radio show on the Hungarian Tilos Rádió station.

The band also started PASO Booking, a gig booking agency with an aim to bring more ska music to Hungary. As well as their local events, they have so far brought acts such as The Toasters, Bad Manners, The Slackers, New York Ska-Jazz Ensemble, and The Aggrolites to the region. They also use this agency to put on a yearly ska camp called Big Skaland Skanking Camping.

Lead vocalist Kristóf Tóth, more commonly known by the stage name KRSA, performs alongside many other Hungarian bands including Irie Maffia and the Budapest Riddim Band. KRSA and the Pannonia Allstars Ska Orchestra brass section have also played with a host of British musicians, including Sam Duckworth, Drew McConnell and Jimmy Pursey for Love Music Hate Racism. Kristóf Tóth is also referred to as Lord Panamo, due to wearing a Panama hat (as well as his trademark white suit) on stage and as a homage to ska artist Lord Tanamo.

== Band members ==
- Kristóf Tóth aka Lord Panamo/KRSA – vocals
- Áron Koós-Hutás aka Mr. Tony Ass – trumpet, vocals
- László Vajay aka Mr. Vajay, Pozanlaci – trombone
- Gábor Lukács aka Baba Luki – saxophone
- Tamás Meleg aka Tommy Hot – saxophone
- Dávid Benkő aka Mr. P – keyboards, vocals
- László Nagy aka Lacibá, Laca – guitar
- Zoltán Csáki aka Csakikapitany – guitar
- Vince Pozsgai aka Dr. Strict – bass
- László Rácz aka Lipi Brown – drums
- György Barna aka G. Brown – violin

== Past members ==
- Gábor Subicz aka Tony Ass – trumpet
- Ádám Ignácz – keyboards

== Discography ==
=== Studio albums ===
Year	Title	Label
2003	Pannonia Allstars Ska Orchestra – Demo	Author's Edition
2005	Budapest Ska Mood	Megalith
2008	The Return of The Pannonians	Megalith
2009	Feel the Riddim!	Megadó Kiadó/Megalith
2012	Lovemonster	Megadó Kiadó/Megalith

=== Live albums ===
Year	Title	Label
2005	All Night Long – Live At Artemovszk	Crossroads Records

=== DVD ===
Year	Title	Label
2009	PASO Turnéfilm/PASO On Tour	Author's Edition

=== Remix album ===
Year	Title	Label
2007	RE:BSM	Author's Edition

=== EPs ===
Year	Title	Label	Album
2007	Babylon Focus	Author's Edition	The Return Of The Pannonians
2010	I Am The One	Author's Edition digital format only	Feel the Riddim!
2011	No Love In Town	Author's Edition digital format only	Feel the Riddim!

=== Singles ===
Year	Title	Label	Album
2007	Moses And The Red Sea / Joseph (7", Single)	Author's Edition	The Return of The Pannonians

== See also ==
- Irie Maffia
- The Toasters
- King Django
- Rotterdam Ska-Jazz Foundation
