= Sound System Records =

Sound System Records is an Australian independent record label that is probably best known for being the label of prominent Australian ska outfit The Porkers. As of 23 February 2007, the label has totalled 30 releases. Sound System's current line up includes The Porkers and Los Capitanes amongst others. Sound System Records is currently headed by Pete Cooper

== See also ==
- Lists of record labels
