= Imperial Leisure =

British ska/rock band

- Origin: London, England
- Genres: Ska, rap, rock, punk rock, hip hop
- Years active: 2001-2025
- Label: Steamroller
- Members: Denis Smith; Scott Vining; Kenneth Brown; Russell Spencer; David Pape, James Tunstall
- Past members: Ben Bridges, Jack Emmings, Richard Cox, Rob O'Neale, Ushwin Pai, Stephanie Faulkner, David Medland, Ben Webb, Jeremy Mudunkotuwe, Mark Rudland, Billy Chauhan, Stuart Maxwell, Dan Dobson, Adrian White, Justas Keliuotis, Elliott Phelps, Jerome Harper.
- Website: www.imperial-leisure.co.uk

Imperial Leisure are a ska / rock band from London, England. Influences include The Specials, Beastie Boys, Rage Against the Machine, Madness, Ozomatli, and Youngblood Brass Band.

== History ==
Imperial Leisure started in 2001 as 10 friends from North London. Previous to this, the eight members (Denis Smith, Ben Webb, Jeremy Mudunkotuwe, Billy Chauhan, Scott Vining, Adrian White, Dan Dobson and Stuart Maxwell) where playing in a band called 'Chewbacca'. The name changed to Imperial Leisure when they added two brass players (Rob O'Neale - Trumpet and Mark Rudland - Trombone).

Imperial Leisure signed to 'Primary Talent' (live music agent) and 'Crucible Management' (band management) in 2004. Their first release was the CD EP Untouchable on Dirty Records in 2005. The next release was a limited edition vinyl "Great British Summertime" and single "Man On The Street" on ORG Records.

In 2007, Imperial Leisure and their management company set up their own record label and music company, Steamroller Music Ltd. Employing other industry professionals and securing private investment for the support of the forthcoming release of their début album.

In 2008 they released four singles with national and local radio play (including BBC Radio One, BBC 6 Music, XFM, Absolute Radio). During this year Imperial Leisure also played many small festivals across the UK and larger ones including the Dance Stage at Glastonbury and the Red Bull stage at Bestival. The Art Of Saying Nothing (2008) was Imperial Leisure's first album released on Steamroller Music. The album launch took place at The Scala live venue in London, England.

During 2009 Ben Webb, Jeremy Mudunkotuwe, Billy Chauhan, Rob O'Neale and Mark Rudland left the band.

In 2012, second album, Death to the One Trick Pony, was released to mixed reviews.

In 2015, third album, Lifestyle Brand, was released along with a new line up. It brought back the party atmosphere, incorporating the various styles of the new band members.

2018 saw the release of the single "Rrrrrollin". This was tied into the 10 year anniversary tour of the first album (The Art of Saying Nothing), which saw headline slots at the O2 Academies in Oxford, Birmingham, Newcastle and Islington (London). For the London show there were 17 people on stage. Ex-members Stu Maxwell, Adrian White, Ben Webb and Jeremy Mudunkotuwe joined the current line up on stage for the set, and MC Lazy Habits guested in the encore.

After their a show at O2 Academy Islington on 20 December 2019 Imperial Leisure had a break from playing live and were said to have split up.

On 30 December 2021, the band marked their return with a performance at The Fleece in Bristol.

2022 saw Imperial Leisure reform and start up again with a smaller and different line up. They continue to play festivals and gigs across UK and Europe.

In 2023 Imperial Leisure released their 4th album Through The Mountain. Written and recorded in Cornwall on every full moon for 9 months, this is an album of varied styles and experiments in different genres. Though The Mountain was recorded at Propagation House, Cornwall, UK and produced by James Bragg.

In 2025 they played their final show in Cornwall before going their separate ways.
