= Hub City Stompers =

American band

- Origin: New Brunswick, New Jersey, U.S.
- Genres: Ska; reggae; oi!
- Years active: 2002–present
- Label: Megalith
- Members: Rev.T Sinister; Jenny Whiskey; Reggae Bob; Rod Gorgeous; G&T James; Hanoi Jay; Wall of Aggro; Pukey B
- Past members: Joey Pip; Nuno "Green Goblin" Rodrigues; Kurt Moreton; Matty Glock; Adam X Chris Jof; Chris Finnegan; Dustin Kreidler; Erik Schroeder; Michael Ambrose; Tim Lawrence; Dave Segal; Sammy Kay; Jon Pozzuto

Hub City Stompers is an American ska, reggae and oi! band formed in 2002, based out of New Brunswick, New Jersey. The band includes former members of Inspecter 7, Professor Plum, Predator Dub Assassins, Bigger Thomas, The Best of the Worst, and Bomb Town among others. They are influenced by various styles of music, including reggae, oi!, punk rock, hardcore, hip-hop and jazz.

== History ==
Hub City Stompers was founded by Rev Sinister, former vocalist/frontman for New Jersey ska band Inspecter 7. In 2001, after Inspecter 7 had stopped performing and touring, Rev Sinister, still anxious to perform and make new music, decided to form a new band. Several Inspecter 7 members, as well as some new musicians, joined in the endeavor and in the summer of 2002 Hub City Stompers was born.

In August 2002 they debuted the song "Night of the Living" on the Jump Up/Megalith Records Still Standing ska compilation. They released their first full-length album, Blood, Sweat and Beers, in May 2004 on Megalith Records. Their self-released Mass Appeal EP came out in July 2005. A studio recording of live-show-favorite "I've Got a Boot" was featured on the Megalith Records Sampler released in January 2006. Their second full-length album, Dirty Jersey, was released in December 2006 on Megalith Records. They released their Ska Ska Black Sheep CD in May 2009 on Stubborn Records. In August 2012 their song "Barking Up The Wrong Tree" was released exclusively on the This Is Not Dead four band compilation 7-inch (on This Is Not Dead Records). Their fifth album, Life After Death, was released on December 5, 2014. In November 2015 they released the full length vinyl LP Caedes Sudor Fermentum (on Crowd Control Media) which featured several "best of" tracks from the first 3 Hub City Stompers albums.

In 2013, the band teamed with Inspecter 7 vocalist Giuseppe Mancini and began performing as Inspecter 7. After one year, the Hub City Stompers lineup separated from Mancini due to directional and musical differences and reformed Hub City Stompers.

In 2018, Hub City Stompers released Haters Dozen on Altercation Records. This was recorded by James Dellatacoma at Bill Laswell’s Orange Music Sound Studios in West Orange, NJ. It was followed by Blood, Sweat, and Years in 2019.

In 2024, "Drinking Rage" was released on Jump Start Records. This was also recorded by James Dellatacoma at Bill Laswell’s Orange Music Sound Studios in West Orange, NJ and also by Rob George at Haus of Whisky Studio in Bordentown, NJ. The single "Bloodstream" was released first as a lathe cut and was also available online in September 2024. The full length would release 2 months later.

== Lineup ==
- Rev.T Sinister – vocals
- Jenny Whiskey – tenor sax, vocals
- Reggae Bob – bass
- Rod Gorgeous – guitar, vocals
- G&T James – trombone, vocals
- Hanoi Jay – guitar, keys
- Wall of Aggro – drums

=== Former/fill-in members ===
- Nuno "Green Goblin" Rodrigues – drums
- Joey Pip – drums
- Kurt Moreton – keyboards
- Matty Glock (Matt Kopf) – guitar
- Adam X (Adam Bower) – former/fill-in original guitar
- JOF (Chris Jefferson)- former original guitar
- Beer Blade the Mighty (Chris Finnegan), former original bass
- DK (Dustin Kreidler) – former baritone sax, alto sax, melodica
- Lord Skoochie (Erik Schroeder) – former/fill-in tenor sax
- Ambrose – former organ, keyboard
- Timmy Two Sticks (Tim Lawrence) tour/fill-in drummer
- Shaky D (Dave Segal) – former guitar
- Sammy Kay – keyboards (live)
- Jon Pozzuto – guitar
- Pukey B – drums, keys
- Pam Anderson - keys

== Discography ==
- Blood, Sweat and Beers (Megalith Records, 2004)
- Mass Appeal EP (2005)
- Dirty Jersey (Megalith Records, 2006)
- Ska Ska Black Sheep (Stubborn Records, 2009)
- Life After Death (Stubborn Records, 2014)
- Caedes Sudor Fermentum (Crowd Control Media, 2015)
- Haters Dozen (Altercation Records, 2018)
- Blood, Sweat, and Years (Altercation Records, 2019)
- Drinking Rage (Jump Start Records, 2024)

== See also ==
- List of ska musicians
