= Aubrey Adams =

Jamaican footballer

- Born: Aubrey Wellington Adams; 17 June 1920; Crossroads, Saint Andrew Parish, Jamaica
- Origin: Jamaica
- Died: 6 August 1990 (aged 70) University of the West Indies, Saint Andrew Parish, Jamaica
- Genres: Jazz, ska
- Occupations: Pianist, bandleader
- Instruments: Piano, organ
- Years active: 1950s–1960s
- Formerly of: Clue J & His Blues Blasters

Aubrey Wellington Adams (17 June 1920 – 6 August 1990) was a Jamaican pianist and keyboard player who was one of the top bandleaders in Jamaica in the 1950s, and led the Dewdroppers as well as playing with Clue J & His Blues Blasters.

== Biography ==
Adams was active in the pre-ska era of Jamaican music when he led a band that had a residency at the Courtleigh Manor Hotel, that included tenor saxophonist Tommy McCook among others. He also played in Sonny Bradshaw's jazz band. He continued to perform in the ska era of the early 1670s, when he played piano for Clue J and His Blues Blasters, and also recorded with Roland Alphonso, Clancy Eccles, Pat Kelly, and the Soul Defenders. His keyboard playing was influential on other ska and jazz players, including Monty Alexander and he had a hit in Jamaica with "Marjie", recorded with his band The Dewdroppers, and released on Clement "Coxsone" Dodd's Worldisc label. Adams became a regular session musician for Dodd in the 1960s, and also played on sessions for Sonia Pottinger, and in Lynn Taitt's band the Jets.

== Discography ==
=== Singles ===
- "Little Willie" (1961), All Stars/Coxsone - Aubrey Adams with Clue J & His Blues Blasters
- "West Kingston Express" (1961), All Stars - Aubrey Adams & the Dewdroppers
- "Mellow Grove" (1961), All Stars - Aubrey Adams & the Dewdroppers
- "Panic in Bond Street" (1961), Coxsone - Aubrey Adams & the Dewdroppers
- "Lady in Red" (1961), Coxsone - Aubrey Adams & the Dewdroppers
- "Stew Peas and Cornflakes" (1961), All Stars - Aubrey Adams & Rico Rodriguez
- "Cherry Island" (1973), Jogibs
