= The Unlimiters =

German ska band

- Origin: Berlin, Germany
- Genres: Ska
- Years active: 2010 – present
- Labels: Highscore Publishing
- Spinoff of: The Essentials
- Members: Nathan Moore; Erika Carmen Abalos; Stefan Kulaszewski; Steffen Hein; Andreas Bergmann; Mathias Wegner; Claudio Jolowicz; Mathieu Pé
- Website: www.facebook.com/unlimiters/

The Unlimiters are a German ska band from Berlin, formed in 2010 by members of the German ska band The Essentials (active since 2003). Their music is influenced both by the early years of ska and its later revival in the 2 Tone era. This is mixed with sounds from genres such as soul, surf and dub.

The Unlimiters released their eponymous debut album in October 2010 on the German independent label Highscore. The song Hard Times from the album was released as a single in September 2010, and appeared in the soundtrack of the 2012 German feature film Reported Missing. The album received favourable reviews in media such as the German reggae magazine Riddim and the German daily newspaper Die Tageszeitung. On 22 October 2010, the German television channel ZDF invited the Unlimiters to perform in front of a national audience in their morning show Morgenmagazin.

2011 saw the release of the two EPs In Dub and In Club, both containing remixes of songs from the first studio album. This collaboration involved dub artists such as Victor Rice as well as cumbia producers such as Erick Rincón. The remixes received airplay internationally on radio stations such as BBC 6 Music and Radio 3 of Radio Nacional de España.

== Members ==
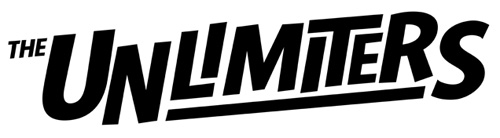
Logo

Current members

- Nathan Moore – lead vocals, trombone
- Erika Carmen Abalos – lead and backing vocals, percussion
- Stefan Kulaszewski – electric guitar
- Steffen Hein – keyboards
- Jeff James – bass guitar
- Mathias Wegner – drums
- Daniel Sauerborn – tenor saxophone
- Jan Kalb – alto saxophone
- Wolf Dörffel – trumpet

Additional musicians

- Geoffrey Vasseur – electric guitar

Former members

- Andreas Bergmann – bass guitar
- Claudio Jolowicz – tenor saxophone
- Mathieu Pe – trumpet
- Stefan Grosse Rüschkamp – trumpet
- Nick 'The Greek' Briggs - tenor saxophone

== Discography ==
The Unlimiters have released one studio album, two EPs and one single.

Year	Details
2010	Hard Times (Single): Released: 24 September 2010; Label: Highscore Publishing; Format: 7" vinyl; B-side: Let It Go
2010	The Unlimiters (CD, LP): Released: 15 October 2010; Label: Highscore Publishing; Format: 12" vinyl, CD
2011	In Dub (EP): Released: 21 November 2011; Label: Highscore Publishing; Format: Digital download
2011	In Club (EP): Released: 5 December 2011; Label: Highscore Publishing; Format: Digital download

== See also ==
- Ska
