= The Louisville Sluggers =

The Louisville Sluggers, also known as The Sluggers, were an Australian swing revival band from Sydney formed in the late 1990s by Glenn "Nugget" Scott and his sister, "The Boss".

Their vision was of a swinging show with a big band sound, styling threads and songs everyone could dance to. The band took its name from the popular baseball bat commonly known as a "Louisville Slugger". (One swings a baseball bat?) This flash of inspiration took place outside the doors of the art deco Enmore Theatre in Sydney, after the band's first photo shoot.

Bandleader and drummer "Nugget" was rapping in hip-hop clubs at 16, drumming in the hardcore band Pitbull Attack, and ice-skating professionally, until his constantly recurring injuries forced him off the ice. With some influence from his sister, "The Boss", and her musical tastes in ska, swing, rockabilly and anything from their parents' era, they set out to find others with the same passion. Six months later they had found enough people for a first rehearsal. This included "The Boss" meeting Gil Morgan, then working in a shop, who became the band's first guitarist and one of the principal songwriters, writing the songs "Masterplan" and the audience favourite "Delores (The Unstoppable)". The first line-up included the vocalist Julijani Vasilkov who also contributed lyrics to several compositions. Eventually the band was fronted by Melanie Alexander.

Within one month of their first rehearsal and with only five songs, "The Boss" had them booked on the Vans Warped Tour, followed by live shows and extensive touring. They became the house band on the Nine Network's short-lived programs Sam and The Fatman and Our Place.

The band gained international attention, most notably reaching number one on the American swing website SwingTop40.com with the song "Time For Swingin'", and they also reached number three twice with the tracks "Well Swung" and "Hey Honey, Please".

After seven years of performance, the band played its final show at The Basement in Sydney in October 2005.

== Former members ==
- Gil Morgan – guitar and songwriter
- Al Lew aka "Big Al" – bass guitar and double bass
- Brook Ayrton – trumpet
- Chris Brasche aka "Slugger" – trumpet
- Daniel Strong – percussion
- Glenn Scott aka "Boo-Boo" a.k.a. "Nugget" – drums
- Grant Cummerford aka "Fingers" – bass guitar and double bass
- Jake Matthews aka "Jnr" – tenor saxophone
- Julijana Vasilkov aka "Miss Velvet Vass" – vocals
- Matt Dwyer aka "Mr. Showbiz" – guitar
- Melanie Alexander aka "Miss Mel" – vocals
- Michelle Scott aka "The Boss" – manager, percussion and backing vocals
- Nick Bowd – baritone saxophone
- Peter Wood – bass guitar and double bass
- Richard Brus – tenor saxophone
- Serge Stanley aka "Power" – saxophone
- Warren Collier aka "Waza" – guitar
- Will Grahame aka "Scarface" – keyboards and piano
- Andrew G – guest theremin player on the 'Bout Time album

== Discography ==
- Time For Swinging (1999)

Tracks:
1. "Time for swinging"
2. "Masterplan"
3. "Rockford"
4. "Blow it baby "

- Hey Honey Please (2000)

Tracks:
1. "Hey honey, please"
2. "Well swung"
3. "Delores the unstoppable"
4. "Pop the hood!"

- All She Had on Was The Radio (2003)

Tracks:
1. "All she had on was the radio"
2. "Perhaps, perhaps, perhaps"
3. Multimedia track "Sluggers studio sessions"

- 'Bout Time (2004)

Tracks:
1. "Reverend Rumble"
2. "Radio (All she had on...)"
3. "Don't boss me"
4. "Night time"
5. "Miss Mirradell (The ghost of...)"
6. "One for my baby"
7. "Doin' time"
8. "Sands of time"
9. "Snake Johnny"
10. "Number of love"
11. "Heat"
12. "Hightime"
13. "Walk don't run + Well swung" (hidden track)

=== Appearances ===
- Punk stars (2000) (track: "Masterplan")
- Spare shells (A tribute to The Specials) (2001) (track: "Gangsters")
