= Friend or Foe? (The Forces of Evil album) =

Friend or FOE?

Studio album by The Forces of Evil
- Released: October 2003
- Recorded: 2003
- Genre: Ska punk
- Length: 31:44
- Label: Jive
- Producer: The Forces of Evil

The Forces of Evil chronology
| Because We Care... (2002) | Friend or FOE? (2003) | Four Song Obituary (2005) |

Professional ratings
Review scores
| Source | Rating |
|---|---|
| Punknews.org | 2.5/5 stars |
| IGN | |
| In Music We Trust | |

Friend or Foe? is the 2003 debut and only studio album by California ska punk band the Forces of Evil, side project of fellow ska punk band Reel Big Fish.

== Track listing ==
1. "Angry Anthem"
2. "Go To Hell" (Suburban Rhythm Cover)
3. "My Life"
4. "Dance the Night Away" (Van Halen Cover)
5. "Vague Love Song"
6. "Hey! Woo! Yeah!"
7. "Mistake"
8. "Worst Day"
9. "Maybe I'm Wrong"
10. "Independent"
11. "Fight"
