= Rotterdam Ska-Jazz Foundation =

Rotterdam Ska-Jazz Foundation (RSJF)
- Origin: Rotterdam, Netherlands
- Genres: Ska; Rocksteady; Jazz; Reggae; Soul
- Years active: 2000–present
- Members: Arjen Bijleveld; Zoot; Joep van Rhijn; Jeroen van Tongeren; Merijn van de Wijdeven; Hidde Wijga; Dimitri Jeltsema

Rotterdam Ska-Jazz Foundation is a band from the Netherlands playing a mix of ska, jazz, rocksteady, reggae and soul, with a strong 1960s influence.

== Discography ==
- 2015: Knock-Turn-All (WTF Records)
- 2007: Motiv Loco (Megalith Records)
- 2005: Sunwalk U.S. (Megalith Records)
- 2005: Sunwalk (Grover Records)
- 2004: Black Night - Bright Morning (Grover Records)
- 2003: Shake Your Foundation! (Grover Records)

== Current members (as of 2011) ==
- Arjen Bijleveld - Trombone
- Zoot - Sax
- Joep van Rhijn - Trumpet
- Jeroen van Tongeren - Guitar
- Merijn van de Wijdeven - Bass
- Hidde Wijga - Keys
- Dimitri Jeltsema - Drums
