= Mark Foggo =

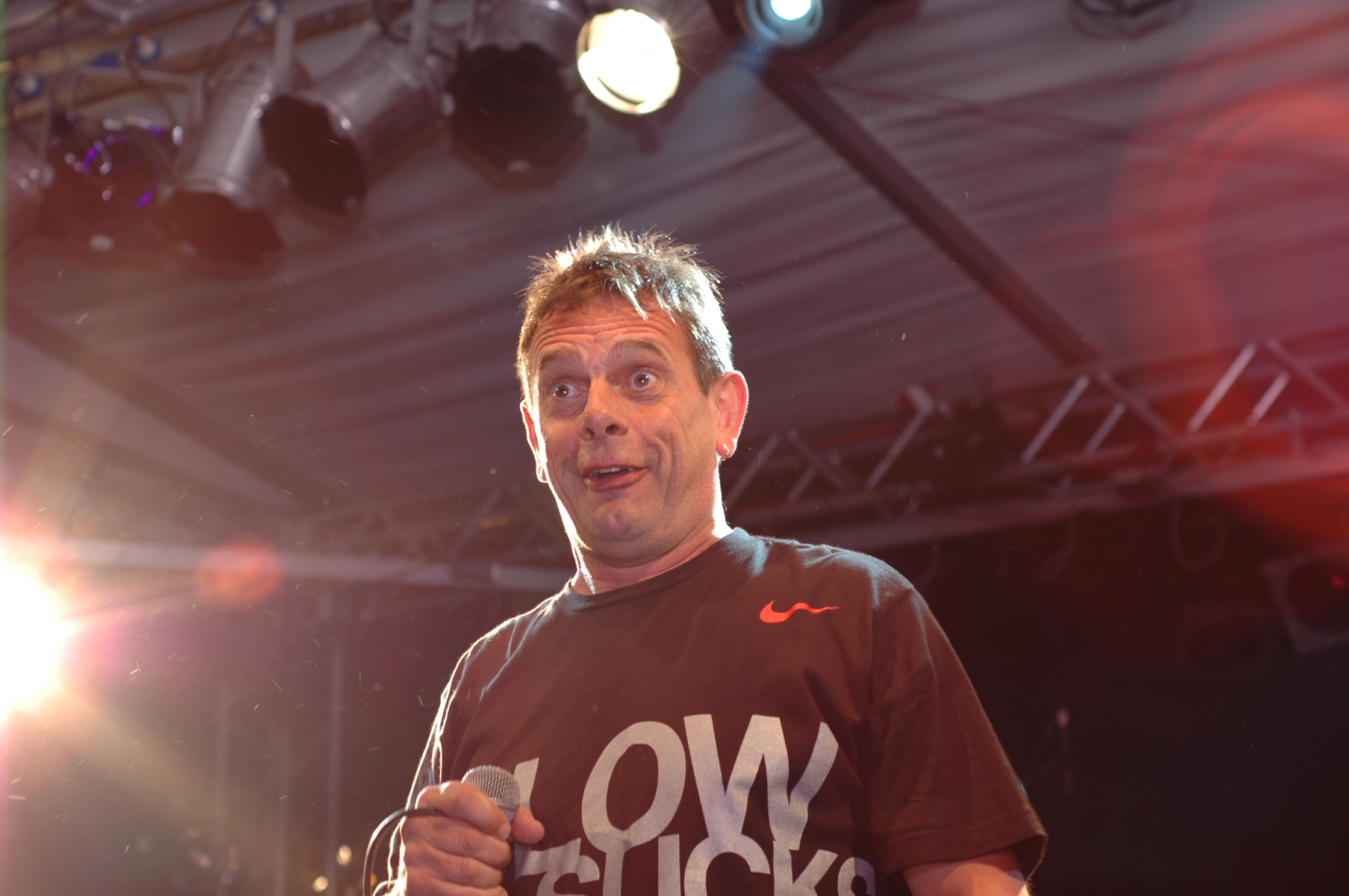
- Mark Foggo performing in Germany in 2005

Background information
- Born: 30 October 1950 (age 74); Liverpool, England
- Genres: Ska
- Occupation: Musician
- Instrument(s): Vocals, guitar
- Years active: 1979–present
- Labels: Skanky'Lil
- Website: www.MarkFoggo.com

Mark Foggo is an English-born ska musician currently based in England, United Kingdom

Beginning his music career in Amsterdam in 1979, Foggo became a prominent figure in Europe's post-2-Tone ska scene, most notably with his band Mark Foggo's Skasters, formed in 1987. Foggo's music, which he describes as "modern, bizarre, non-influenced, up tempo ska", is characterised by his observational and darkly comic lyricism, as well as his manic and boisterous stage personality.

Foggo's most recent studio album, Mad, was released in 2010 on V2 Records, and his band continues to tour Europe extensively. In addition, Foggo has also operated his own all-ska record label and booking agency Skanky'Lil Music since 1990, leading him to be called "the hardest working man in ska" and "a ska missionary" on a "never ending quest of playing and supporting ska music where ever he goes".

== Biography ==
Born in Liverpool, Mark Foggo began playing music at age fourteen, inspired by British rhythm and blues groups such as The Animals, whose singer Eric Burdon Foggo cites as an influence. Several years later, Foggo moved to London in hopes of finding work as a guitarist, playing the London pub circuit with a number of different rhythm and blues and punk rock bands for most of the late 1970s.

=== Professional career ===
In 1979, Foggo relocated to Amsterdam. Around this time, he had discovered ska music through the popularity of 2-Tone bands such as The Specials and The Beat, inspiring him to start his own punk/ska band, The Secret Meeting. After independently releasing a single entitled "New Shoes", the band was promptly signed to Polydor Records in 1980, re-releasing "New Shoes" to moderate success in the Netherlands and followed up with an LP, Speeding My Life Away, and extensive European touring. Foggo's passion for ska eventually grew larger until he omitted the punk and New Wave elements from his music entirely, focusing exclusively on ska for his first solo album, 1983's A State of Mind, released on Boni Records. The album proved successful enough that EMI Records approached Foggo shortly afterwards to record an album for their label under the condition that the music wasn't ska, as the genre was at its commercial nadir at the time. According to Foggo, he "recorded a shit rock album [1985's Weapons and Guitars] and went on holiday with [the] money. Afterwards it was straight back to ska".

Foggo formed his most notable band, Mark Foggo's Skasters, in 1987, naming themselves such to make it clearer to audiences what type of music the band played. Their 1989 debut, Ska Pig, was a big success in the Netherlands and Germany, is often cited as a classic of the ska genre. The Skasters continued to tour exhaustively across Europe and record prolifically on several labels until Foggo founded his own label Skanky'Lil in 1990 to release his own music, as well as promote new up-and-coming ska bands and distribute material from established European ska bands like The Hotknives and Skarface.

In 2000, Foggo formed The Babyshakers, a side project which mixed ska with rock and roll and rockabilly. The group recorded one album, Shake the Baby, featuring several tracks which would later become part of the Skasters' repertoire.

=== Current work ===
In 2010, Foggo's band signed to V2 Records to release the album Mad later that year. As of 2011, Foggo still continues to tour regularly and exhaustively, featuring a rotating roster of backing musicians. Alongside Foggo, saxophonist Paul Berding remains as the last original member of the Skasters and the sole constant member of Foggo's group. Although his band has occasionally toured in Japan (releasing a Japanese-only compilation in 2006), Foggo almost exclusively tours within Europe, most frequently throughout Germany, France, Netherlands, Belgium, Czech Republic, Austria and Switzerland.

== Discography ==
=== Albums ===
As Mark Foggo & the Secret Meeting

- Speeding My Life Away (1980, Polydor)

As Mark Foggo

- A State of Mind (1983, Boni)
- Weapons + Guitars (1985, EMI-Bovema Holland)
- Haircut (1995, Skanky'Lil)
- It's Only a Game (2006, Skanky'Lil)
- Mad (2010, V2 Records)

With The Babyshakers

- Shake the Baby (2001, Skanky'Lil)

As Mark Foggo's Skasters

- Ska Pig (1989, Skank) (1993, Universe; 1996, Skanky'Lil)
- Couldn't Play Ska (1992, Universe) (1996, Skanky'Lil)
- St. Valentines Day Massacre (1998, Skanky'Lil)
- The Missionaries of Ska (2002, Skanky'Lil)
- You Shot Me (2005, Skanky'Lil)
- Ska Pig Returns (2019, Jump Up Records)

Compilations

- Lucky to be Alive (1994, Universe)
- Best of... (2001, Skanky'Lil)
- Hello Ska People (2006, Phantom) (Japanese release)

Live albums

- Captain Skarlet (live) (1990, Skank) (1996, Skanky'Lil)
- "Live at fiesta la mass" (2017, Skanky'Lil Records)

=== Singles ===
As Mark Foggo & the Secret Meeting

- "New Shoes" / "It Gets You Down" (1979, Top Hole; 1980, Polydor)
- "New Shoes" / "Out of Place" (1980, Polydor)
- "New Shoes" / "Ace of Spades" (1981, Polydor)

As Mark Foggo

- "Advertising" / "Human Error" (1982)
- "The Innocence of Youth" / "You Never Asked" (1983, Boni)
- "Miss Understanding" / "Hold on to Your Hat" (1983, Boni)
- "Caribbean Island" / "Seems Like Years" (1983, Boni)
- "Weapons and Guitars" / "Human Error" (1985, EMI)
- "I Never Promised You Anything" / "Posers" (1985, EMI)
- "Taking Things too Far" / "Oops I Did it Again" (1985, EMI)

As Mark Foggo's Skasters

- "Hashish Uit Amsterdam" (1997, Skanky'Lil)
- "The Day I Met Muhammad Ali" (2010, Skanky'Lil)
