= Allniters =

Australian ska band

The Allniters
- Origin: Sydney, New South Wales, Australia
- Genres: Ska, reggae, pop
- Years active: 1980–1987, 1999–2000, 2004
- Labels: Green, Larrikin, Powderworks, Mushroom, RCA, Sound System
- Spinoffs: The Igniters
- Past members: see members list below

The Allniters are a Sydney-based Australian ska pop band, founded in 1980. Original line-up was Ted Ayers on sax, Dave Bebb on drums, Stuart Crysell on guitar, Martin Fabok on guitar, Peter Hill-Travis on vocals, Graham Hood (The Johnnys) on bass guitar, Brett Pattinson on vocals and Mark Taylor on keyboards. Numerous changes occurred in band members with Fabok, Hill-Travis and Pattinson common to almost all line-ups.

In 1983, The Allniters performed a ska-style cover of Bobby Bloom's hit "Montego Bay", which peaked at No. 19 on the Australian singles charts. They followed with an album D-D-D-Dance, which contained the slower and more mainstream "Love and Affection" single. Both album and single received wide airplay on radio stations around Australia and were top 40 hits. More singles followed before the Allniters separated in early 1985. The band reformed later that year with a substantially revised line-up and continued performing and recording through the late 1980s. In August 1988, ''The Canberra Times'' reported that the group had a new single due for release and a partially completed album.

The band continued performing into 1989 before disbanding again in August of that year. They briefly reformed in 1999 to tour and then record. Another Fine Mess was released before they disbanded once more, and they reformed yet again during 2004 but no new material was released.

== Biography ==
The Allniters were centred on founding guitarist Martin Fabok in 1980 in Sydney. The other original members were Ted Ayers on sax, Dave Bebb on drums, Stuart Crysell on guitar, Peter Hill-Travis on vocals, Graham Hood on bass guitar, Brett Pattinson on vocals and Mark Taylor on keyboards. The band's first performance was at the Sussex Hotel in September 1980. They were an ill-defined line-up with not all members performing at early gigs. They released "She Made a Monkey Out of Me" for the independent Green Records in August 1981 and followed with "You Shouldn't Stay Out Late" in 1982.

Ayers, Betts, Crysell, Fabok, Taylor of The Allniters together with other musicians, Dave Pye on trumpet (Fast Cars), Kirk Pengilly on saxophone (INXS) and Stuart Martin trombone recorded as studio-based band, The Igniters, at Sydney's 2JJJ studio 221, and released a dub reggae EP Igniters in 1982 on Green Records.

The Allniters signed with Midnight Oil's label Powderworks and with RCA in 1983. First single for Powderworks was "Hold On" in May, followed by a cover of Bobby Bloom's "Montego Bay" in September, which peaked at No. 19 on the Australian singles charts. Their debut album, D-D-D-Dance was released in October and a third single, "Love and Affection" followed in November. The album and all three singles had reached the Top 40 on the Australian charts. The line-up were Ayers, Crysell, Fabok, Hill-Travis, Pattinson and Taylor, and new members, Perry Andronos on bass guitar, Julie Conway on vocals, Dave Lennon on drums and Stephen Luke on trombone.

In 1984, a new line-up of studio band, The Igniters, containing Crysell, Fabok, Luke and Taylor, together with Toni Allaylis on vocals, Simone Dee on vocals, Cliff Griggs on drums (Spy vs Spy), Patou Powell on vocals (Caribe), Phillip Ayres (saxophone) Steven Luke (trombone) Dave Kimber (keys on 'Man through the door') Kate Swadling on vocals and Mike Weiley on guitars (Spy vs Spy) was formed to record a second EP. The Allniters also released two more singles in 1984, "Screaming Dreaming" in August and "I Saw You First" in December. The band separated in January 1985 as Ayers, Crysell and Taylor formed Castles in Spain.

By July 1985, Conway, Fabok, Hill-Travis, Luke and Pattinson reformed The Allniters with Peter Bolke on bass guitar, Ralph Franke on saxophone, Mark Fuccilli on saxophone, Dale Pandit on drums and Mark Tanner on guitar. Late 1985 and early 1986 saw further line-up changes where Conway, Franke, Hill-Travis and Pattinson, teamed with new crew of Michael Allen on keyboards, Troy Duncombe on bass guitar, Simon Knapman on drums and Mickey Mahoney on guitar.This line-up recorded "All That Easy", which was released by Mushroom Records in July 1987 with Mental As Anything's Martin Plaza producing. The single had no chart success and The Allniters disbanded.

A compilation album, The Best of... was released in 1996. The Allniters reformed with a new lead singer, Miss Velvet Vass (aka Juliana Vasilkov), and released "Nowhere Fast", written by guitarist Marcus Phelan, on the Sound System Record label. With Marcus Phelan, Peter Aitkens (drums), Alistair Law (keyboards), Justine Harrison (vocals), Nick Hempton and Steve Luke (Horns), joining the old firm of Travis, Pattinson, Fabok and Andronos they recorded the album Another Fine Mess, released in early 2000. In 1998 they teamed up with The Porkers for the east coast 'Skafari' tour. Vass joined up with The Louisville Sluggers as The Allniters disbanded again in 2001. They reformed in 2004 to support reggae band, UB40's Australian tour, but they did not record new material.

== Members ==
Listed alphabetically:

- Michael Allen — keyboards (1986–1987)
- Perry Andronos — bass guitar (1983–1985, 1999–2000)
- Ted (Phil) Ayers — saxophone (1980–1985)
- David Bebb — drums (1980–1983)
- Peter Bolke — bass guitar (1985)
- Julie Conway — vocals (1983–1985, 1985–1987, 1999–2000)
- Stuart Crysell — guitar (1980–1985)
- Troy Duncombe — bass guitar (1985–1988)
- Martin Fabok — guitar (1980–1985, 1985–1986, 1999–2000)
- Ralph Franke — saxophone (1985–1987)
- Mark Fuccilli — saxophone (1985–1986)
- Peter Hill-Travis — vocals (1980–1985, 1985–1987, 1999–2000)
- Graham Hood — bass (1980–1983)
- Simon Knapman — drums (1986–1987)
- Peter McGreggor — drums (1981–1982)
- Alistair Law — keyboard (1998–1999, 2004)
- Dave Lennon — drums (1983–1985)
- Stephan Luke — trombone (1983–1985, 1985–1986)
- Mickey Mahoney – guitar (1986–1988)
- Dale Pandit – drums (1985–1986)
- Brett Pattinson – vocals, percussion (1980–1985, 1985–1987, 1999–2000)
- Marcus Phelan; guitar, vocals (1987) (1998–1999)
- Mark Tanner – guitar (1985–1986)
- Mark Taylor – keyboards (1980–1985)
- Juliana Vasilkov (aka Miss Velvet Vass) – vocals (1999–2000)
- Simon Wale - drums - (2017 - 2024)

== Discography ==
=== Studio albums ===
List of albums, with selected chart positions
Title	Album details	Peak chart positions
Title	Album details	AUS
D-D-D-Dance	Released: October 1983; Format: LP; Label: Powderworks (POW 6060)	18
Another Fine Mess	Released: 2000; Format: CD; Label: Sound System Records (00CDA019)	-

=== Compilation albums ===
List of compilation albums
Title	Album details
Rarities & B-Sides	Released: 1 September 1984; Format: LP; Label: Powderworks
The Best of...	Released: 1996; Format: CD; Label: Broad Music (BRCD 081)

=== Singles ===
List of singles, with selected chart positions
Year	Title	Peak chart positions	Album
Year	Title	AUS	Album
1981	"She Made a Monkey Out of Me"	-	non album single
1982	"You Shouldn't Stay Out Late"	-	non album single
1982	"Jingle Bells"	-	non album single
1983	"Hold On"	40	D-D-D-Dance
1983	"Montego Bay"	19	D-D-D-Dance
1983	"Love and Affection"	45	D-D-D-Dance
1984	"Screaming Dreaming"	84	Rarities & B-Sides
1984	"I Saw You First"	-	Rarities & B-Sides
1985	"Wake up Sydney"	-	non album single
1985	"Wake up Sydney"	-	non album single
1987	"All That Easy"	76	non album single
1999	"Nowhere Fast"	-	Another Fine Mess
