= Rude King =

American ska band

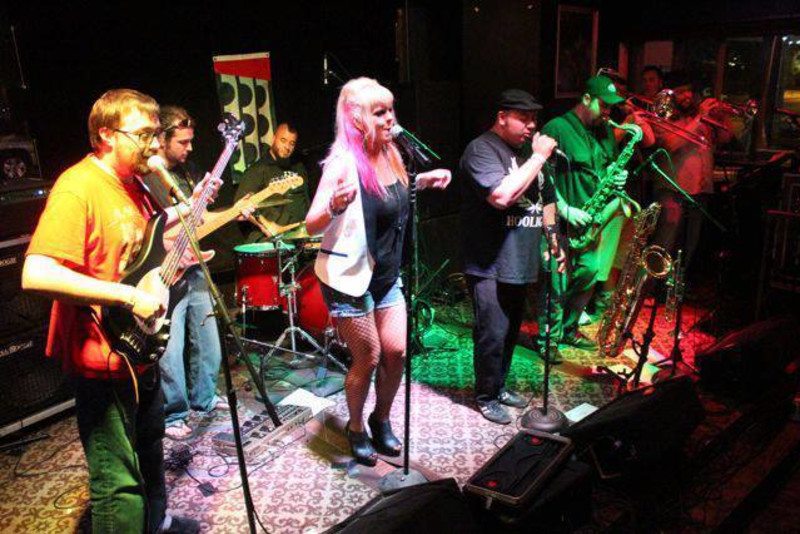
- Rude King

Background information
- Origin: Dallas, Texas
- Genres: ska
- Years active: 2003 – present
- Label: None
- Members: Jon Bravo; Justin Rush; Jediah Redden; John Vietta; Jesse Speer; Chris Casey; Tony Edmonds
- Past members: Chris Dickson; Felix Pacheco; Houston Bogus; Robert Hatch; Davonna Thomas; Jeff Thomas; Casey Kowalski; Kevin Kaiser; Rob Tovar; Vikki Tovar; Jim Barsanti; Alex Hernandez; Jason Busch
- Website: http://www.rudeking.com

Rude King is an American ska band originally formed in Chicago, Illinois, in 2003 before relocating to Dallas, Texas, in 2006. Their music is a fusion of influences including early ska, reggae, blues, soul, rocksteady, 2 tone, third wave ska, and punk rock with pop lyrics about love, relationships, and the politics of live and local music.

== Tours & Festivals ==
Rude King performed at the last year of the Ska In The Park festival at the Pomona Fox Theater in Pomona, California in 2010.

The band has performed at SKA Brewing in Durango, Colorado on multiple tours.

In 2011, Rude King performed at Houston, Texas pizza restaurant Late Nite Pie three months before the historic building was destroyed by arson.

The band performed at the Fistful of Ska festival in Des Moines, Iowa in both 2013 and 2014.

In 2014, the band won the "Battle for Suburbia" event at the House of Blues in Dallas, earning a live appearance on WFAA morning show, Good Morning Texas, and a spot on stage at the inaugural Suburbia Music Festival in Plano, TX.

Also in 2014, Rude King performed at both the Valley of the Vapors festival and the Hot Water Hills festival in Hot Springs, Arkansas.

Rude King performed at the 2017 Supernova International Ska Festival in Fredericksburg, Virginia.

== Discography ==
- Rude To The Last Drop (2004)
- Ruder, Better, Faster, Stronger (2011)
- It'll Probably Be Alright (2013)
- Coming Back To You (2015)
