= RedSka =

- Origin: Cesena, Italy
- Genres: Ska-punk, ska-core, reggae
- Years active: 2001–2017
- Labels: One Step Records; Venus (Italy); Mad Butcher (Germany)

RedSka was an Italian ska-punk band formed in 2001 in Romagna, Italy.

== Biography ==
In 2004 they released their first official album Mi son sbagliato nel confondermi ("I was mistaken while confusing myself") (Sana Records / Audioglobe), a blend of ska-punk with strong influences of Californian ska, mixed with reggae, raggamuffin, swing, blues, hardcore and rocksteady sounds. There were guest appearances from The Hormonauts and Enri.

In 2007 the album has got re-released in an updated version, including a few live performances and video-clip with One Step Records, independent label, founded by the band's singer. By support of their audience, independent radio and other underground Italian bands, allowed the album to be quite successful in Europe. After this release the band has an increasingly busy tour schedule all around Italy and the first experiences in Continental Europe.

In 2008 the RedSka issued their second album, Le mie prigioni ("My prisons") on One Step Records / Maninalto! / Venus; and One Step Records / Mad Butcher Records in Germany), a rougher and more aggressive work both in sound and lyrics. The album housed collaborations with Banda Bassotti, Matrioska, Los Fastidios, and The Good Fellas. The lyrics, save for a few songs are centered mainly on politics, religion, work and against wars and racial discrimination stressing more firmly the band's social commitment.

The band embarked on a long tour, with many gigs in Croatia, Switzerland, Austria, Germany, France and Czech Republic aside the usual Italian venues.

In 2011 year of the decennary of their history, RedSka return to the studio to work on the third official album, titled "La Rivolta". During the making of new album, two more records are released: "MSSNC", new edition of the first album for the German Mad Butcher Records, and the split-album with The Offenders "Rude League" (Mad Butcher Records/ Kob Records/ RedStar73 Records. The latter is released in Europe and is followed by a tour in Germany at the end of 2011 ("Rude League Tour 2011"). After the publication on web of two singles (the title-track "La Rivolta" and "Hooligan Rudeboys"), in 2012 the band presents the new awaited album "La Rivolta". "La Rivolta" is an album in which RedSka express perfectly all their own sonorous and communicative potentialities. A powerful and perfect groove of punk, ska, reggae, raggamuffin attacks listener and he is carried into an album enriched by many collaborations (The Offenders, No Relax, Arpioni, Rude HI-FI).

The release of album, published between January and February in Europe by One Step Records-Venus/ Mad Butcher Records/ RedStar73 Records, is followed by a thick tour around the European continent.

== Discography ==
- 2004 - Mi son sbagliato nel confondermi
- 2007 - Mi son sbagliato nel confondermi 2007 edition
- 2008 - Le mie prigioni
- 2011 - MSSNC (Mi son sbagliato nel confondermi new edition)
- 2011 - Rude League (EP-Split with The Offenders)
- 2012 - La rivolta

== Band ==
- Il Duca - voice
- Lord RockSteady Montz - guitar
- De Veggent - keyboards
- Aflo - bass guitar
- Gelo - drums
