= Megalith Records =

Megalith Records is a ska record label founded in 2002 and located in Norman, Oklahoma. It is owned by Robert "Bucket" Hingley of The Toasters and the defunct label Moon Ska Records, and managed by Jeremy Patton, current webmaster and graphic artist for the Toasters. Manufacturing duties are carried out by Brett of AtoZ Media Services, a CD pressing plant company based in New York City.

In addition to CDs and LPs, all of the label's releases are available from more than 50 digital download pay sites. The label has released more than 60 records. The label has released some digital-only albums and plans to continue this, many of which are releases that have been out of print for years, or have not had physical releases available in the United States. The label has struck a physical distribution deal with MVD Entertainment Group, for in-store CD product sales and distribution.

== Bands ==
- 3 Minute Warning
- Babylove and the Van Dangos
- Betagarri
- The BiG
- The Bluebeats
- Bigger Thomas
- Bomb Town
- Channel One
- Deal's Gone Bad
- The Dendrites
- Deskarats
- Desorden Público
- Don Segundo
- Eastern Standard Time
- Fast Food Orchestra
- Hub City Stompers
- Kingston Kitchen
- King Django
- Los Furios
- Los Skarnales
- Mile 21
- Mr. T-Bone
- New York Ska-Jazz Ensemble
- Open Season
- The Palookas
- Pannonia Allstars Ska Orchestra
- The Pepper Pots
- RiceRokit
- Rotterdam Ska-Jazz Foundation
- Royal City Riot
- Royal Roost
- The Rudie Crew
- Ryan Scroggins And The Trenchtown Texans
- The Scorchers
- St. Petersburg Ska-Jazz Review
- The Toasters
- Two And A Half White Guys
- 2Tone Lizard Kings
- Westbound Train
- Victor Rice
- The Void Union

== See also ==
- List of record labels
