= The Rough Kutz =

Rough Kutz
- Origin: Stoke-on-Trent, England
- Genre: Ska
- Years active: 1993–present
- Members: Hazza; Brigga; Rat; Tony; Sean; Yatesy
- Past members: Stumpy; Chris; Red; Hairy; Bilko; Booty; Nick; Jai; Iggy; Mucka

The Rough Kutz are a third wave ska band from Stoke-on-Trent, England.

== Band history ==
The Rough Kutz were formed by Hazza (Hammond organ), Brigga (vocals) and Rat (guitar) in 1993. The band changed its line-up over the years. The current line-up consists of three other members: Tony (bass), Sean (lead guitar) and Yatesy (drums). The first studio album, A Bit O' Rough was released in 1998 on Antwerp-based ska label Skanky 'Lil Records. After this release the band began touring Europe.

The Rough Kutz released a second album, Welcome to our World in 2002, followed by Another Week Another War in 2006. On this album, Roddy Radiation from The Specials played guest lead guitar. In 2006, they also performed a European tour with Radiation on guitar. In 2010, The Rough Kutz released their fourth album, Gangster's Playground, on RK Records. In 2012, The Rough Kutz recorded a version of The Specials' song Rude Boys Outa Jail for the Specialized charity album in aid of the Teenage Cancer Trust. They performed live at the CD launch gig in the home of Two Tone Records, Coventry, once again with Roddy Radiation.

2013 saw the band celebrate their 20th year and a planned album release. The band were included on the Specialized 2: Beat Teenage Cancer compilation album with their cover of The Beat's Noise in This World. The band were due to play Don Valley Stadium in Sheffield, England in August 2013 on a bill that included the Skatalites and UB40. The Rough Kutz' fifth album Dirty Sex at Midnight was released in October 2013. An album launch and 20th anniversary gig took place in Burslem, Stoke on Trent on 5 October 2013. This was Brigga's last gig after fronting the band for 13 of its 20 years. The Rough Kutz have appeared on various ska compilation albums.

== Current members ==
- Spike - Vocals
- Hazza - Hammond Organ
- Sean - Lead guitar
- Booty - Bass
- Rat - Guitar
- Yatesy - Drums
- Charl - Sax

== Previous members ==
- Brigga - Vocals
- Stumpy - Vocals
- Chris - Sax
- Red - Guitar
- Hairy - Sax
- Stumpy - Trumpet
- Nick - Drums
- Jai - Vocals
- Iggy - Bass
- Jons - Vocals
- Mucka - Vocals
- Tony - Bass

== Discography ==
=== Albums ===
- A Bit O' Rough (1998), Skanky 'Lil Records
- Welcome to our World (2002), Skanky 'Lil Records
- Another Week Another War (2006), Skanky 'Lil Records
- Gangster's Playground (2010), RK Records
- Dirty Sex at Midnight (2013), RK Records
- Strictly Anti-Cabaret (2022), Randale Records

=== Compilations ===
- Stay Sharp Vol. 2 (Bronco Bullfrog)
- Gangsters Of Ska (Bronco Bullfrog)
- A Full English Breakfast - The English Ska Compilation (T-Leaf Records)
- Mad Dogs & Englishmen (Do The Dog Music)
- Skanking The Scum Away (Mad Butcher Records)
- Specialized: A Modern Take on Specials Classics (Specials2)
- Specialized 2: Beat Teenage Cancer (Specials2)
