= Clue J & His Blues Blasters =

Jamaican band

- Origin: Kingston, Jamaica
- Genres: R&B, calypso, ska
- Years active: late 1950s–early 1960s
- Labels: Worldisc, Studio One
- Past members: Cluett Johnson; Ernest Ranglin; Emmanuel "Rico" Rodriguez; Roland Alphonso; Theophilus Beckford; Aubrey Adams; Arkland "Drumbago" Parks; Ken Williams; Herman Sang; Keith Stoddart; Lloyd Mason; Monty Alexander

Clue J & His Blues Blasters were a Jamaican band of the late 1950s and early 1960s led by Cluett Johnson, who were one of the first bands to play ska. Several of the band's members went on to join The Skatalites.

== History ==
Formed in the late 1950s, the band was led by double bassist Cluett Johnson (aka Clue J), and other members included Ernest Ranglin (guitar), Emmanuel "Rico" Rodriguez (trombone), Roland Alphonso (tenor saxophone), Theophilus Beckford (piano), Aubrey Adams (piano/organ), and Arkland "Drumbago" Parks (drums). The band was the first to make records in Jamaica, their earliest releases being calypso or R&B, such as "Shuflling Jug", and were promoted on producer Clement "Coxsone" Dodd's Downbeat sound system and released on his Worldisc label. Johnson is sometimes credited with creating the term "ska", after telling Ranglin to "play it like ska, ska, ska", but this is disputed. Most of the band members went on to greater fame in bands such as The Skatalites. Johnson relocated to Montego Bay where he performed at a hotel until his death.
