= Natti Love Joys =

US musical group

The Natti Love Joys are an American roots rock reggae band that have been playing live since 2003.

They consist of husband and wife duo Anthony "Jatti" Allen and Sonia "Marla" Allen (formerly Sonia Abel). Jatti was previously the bassist for the reggae group The Congos while Marla originates from the all female reggae group Love Joys where she recorded two albums under the Wackies label run by Lloyd Barnes (Bullwackie). The Love Joys consisted of Sonia Abel and her cousin Claudette Brown. Family obligations kept the Natti Love Joys off the circuit until they returned with a collaboration between Kwaku Darkwa of FocalPoint, and Nicolas Da Silva of FlashTV, to release ThingZ in 2007. Since then, they have released Orchestrata in 2022.

The Natti Love Joys are also the founders of Camp Reggae, a reggae musical festival deep in the Tennessee mountains, that celebrates the outdoors and promotes the importance of family. They are also three time recipients of Atlanta's Peach Drop Awards as the most influential reggae band.

The song "Stranger" by the Love Joys, was the used by Johnny Depp on his first TikTok post.

The song "All I Can Say" by the Love Joys, is on the Saints Row reggae radiostation.
