= Deal's Gone Bad =

American band

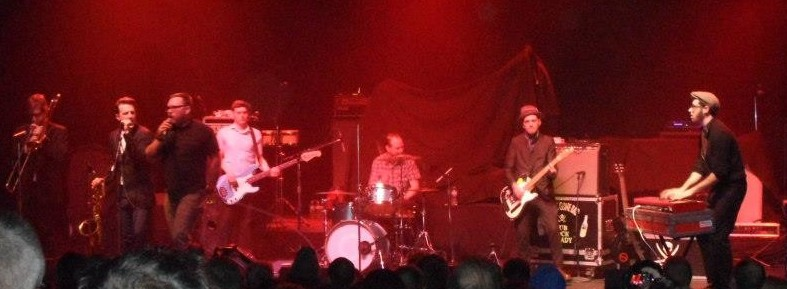
- Chicago 2013

Background information
- Origin: Chicago, Illinois
- Genres: Reggae, Ska, Soul
- Years active: 1994–present
- Labels: Jump Up!, Megalith
- Members: Todd Hembrook; Dave Simon; Karl Gustafson; Mike Corcoran; Mike Hobson; Aaron Hammes; Pedro Hernandez
- Past members: Mike Park; Doug Corcoran; Marty Madera; Dennis McQuinn; Danny Johnson; Julio Herrera; Brian Garibaldi; Tom Riley; Philip Ohst; Aret Sekalian; Jacek Minkowski; Bob Chapman; Louis Wells
- Website: Official website

Deal's Gone Bad is a band from Chicago, Illinois. Their sound mixes reggae, rocksteady, and ska music with American soul. They have been together since 1994, with numerous lineup changes over the years. The current incarnation has been mostly stable since 2003. The band hews to a more traditional ska-reggae sound while many others working in the genre morphed into a more punk variety.

The band has shared the stage with performers such as the Skatalites, Toots & the Maytals, Desmond Dekker, The English Beat, Hepcat, Chuck Berry, The Slackers, Flogging Molly, The Toasters, Mustard Plug, Voodoo Glow Skulls, and The Mighty Mighty Bosstones.

== History ==
Deal's Gone Bad formed in 1994 and played locally in Chicago for several years, releasing their debut in 1996. They then signed to Jump Up! Records and released Large and In Charge in 1998. This album featured cover art inspired by the Stanley Kubrick film A Clockwork Orange and was heavily influenced by 1960s reggae and ska musicians such as Prince Buster, The Skatalites and The Wailers; it prompted Allmusic to call them "one of the most intriguing bands on the scene." The album also incorporated soul into many of its songs, an element which would remain an important part of their sound for many years. The follow-up, Overboard, followed in 1999, which featured more prominent organ parts due to the addition of keyboardist Julio Herrera. Both Large and In Charge and Overboard featured songs dealing with pirates as subject matter.

An EP and a full-length arrived in 2003 from the group, followed in 2005 by a compilation disc, The Longest Happy Hour, which also included two previously unreleased songs. The group performed on the Vans Warped Tour in 2006. In 2007, Megalith Records released their next album, The Ramblers, by which time only Dave Simon and Mike Corcoran remained from the group's original incarnation. Shortly after the release of The Ramblers, the group toured with Voodoo Glow Skulls, The Toasters, and Mustard Plug on the Ska Is Dead tour in 2009. In May 2011, the group released its first new material in four years with an EP entitled Far From Home. The band has not been active since around 2014.

== Current lineup ==
- Todd Hembrook - Lead vocals
- Dave Simon - Guitar
- Karl Gustafson - Keyboards
- Mike Corcoran - Drums
- Mike "Spider" Hobson - Bass
- Aaron Hammes - Bari & Tenor sax, vocals
- Andrew "Pedro" Hernandez - Trombone

=== Former members ===
- Mike Park - Lead vocals (not to be confused with Californian ska/punk musician Mike Park)
- Brian Garibaldi - Bass, backing vocals
- Doug Corcoran - Trumpet, keys, organ, vocals
- Marty Madera - Bass
- Denis McQuinn - Tenor sax
- Danny Johnson - Alto sax, backing vocals
- Tom Riley - Tenor sax, vocals
- Julio Herrera - keyboards
- Aret Sakalian - keyboards
- Dave "Boner" Bosonetta - trombone, backing vocals
- Phil Ohst - Tenor Sax, Baritone Sax, Guitar
- T.J. Annerino - Guitar, drums

== Discography ==
- Orgasmico (1996)
- Large and In Charge (1998) (Jump Up! Records)
- Elephants/ Mad at the World 7" (1998) (Jump Up! Records)
- Overboard (1999) (Jump Up! Records)
- Fire! EP (2002) (Jump Up! Records)
- Guide to Boat Drinks and Cruise Cocktails (2002) (Jump Up! Records)
- The Longest Happy Hour: 1998-2003 (2005) (Jump Up! Records)
- The Ramblers (2007) (Jump Up! Records/Megalith Records)
- Far From Home EP (2011) (Self-released)
- Heartbreaks & Shadows (2014) (Self-released)
