= Murphy's Kids =

American band

- Origin: Richmond, Virginia, United States
- Genres: Ska, ska punk, reggae
- Years active: 1999–2017
- Label: Community Records
- Members: Reid Attaway; John Charlet; Randy Bradley; Adam Bonini; Nate Koch
- Past members: DJ Kyriakides; Tom Callahan; Jason Cunningham; Eli Doxtator; David Haygood; Paul Riley; Matt Singleton; Will Thompson
- Website: murphyskids.com

Murphy's Kids was a six-piece American ska punk band from Richmond, Virginia, formed in 1999. The group has toured up and down the East Coast of the United States and is noted for organizing the yearly Happy Skalidays charity benefit show. The band is also known for being politically active.

Their album, The Anti-Corporate Beach Party, was recorded in Petersburg, Virginia at Imagine Music Studios and had almost sold out its first pressing of 1,000 copies as of December 2006.

In 2009, they released Departures.

== History ==
Murphy's Kids formed in suburban Midlothian, Virginia in the summer of 1999. The original lineup featured John Charlet (vocals, trumpet), Reid Attaway (guitar, vocals), David Haygood (bass), Paul Riley (trombone) and Will Thompson (drums). Despite several lineup changes over the years, the core songwriting team of John Charlet and Reid Attaway has remained intact. The band's size has fluctuated between five and seven members but has, in recent months, settled into the current six-piece lineup.

The band's sound has evolved over the years. In the early days, their sound and lyrical content was heavily influenced by third wave ska bands Reel Big Fish and Less Than Jake. As the band members matured mentally and musically, so did their songs. Murphy's Kids' current sound mixes elements of ska, reggae, funk, punk and metal with influences ranging from The Police to Rx Bandits.

Murphy's Kids are well known in the Richmond area for their energetic live performances. They have shared the stage with international touring acts The Slackers, The Toasters, Voodoo Glow Skulls, The Pietasters, Fighting Gravity, Reel Big Fish, The Ernies, the Fray, Soldiers of Jah Army and others.

On December 21, 2006, the band performed an acoustic set during an episode of "Activate!" on radio station WRIR-FM to promote Happy Skalidays, performing several unreleased songs.

The band performed its last show at Skalidays 2017 at The Camel in Richmond, Virginia. In 2021, the band played a reunion show in Virginia Beach with The Pietasters and Black Tie Society.

== Members ==
=== Past members ===
- Reid Attaway – guitar, vocals
- John Charlet – vocals, trumpet
- Alex Powers – trombone
- Nate Koch – saxophone
- Randy Bradley – drums
- Daniel Attaway – bass
- Reginald Chapman – bass trombone
- Adam Bonini – bass
- Kelly Hazlett – bass
- Tom Callahan – bass
- Steve Owen – bass
- Jason Cunningham – saxophone
- Eli Doxtator – drums
- David Haygood – bass
- Paul Riley – trombone
- Matt Singleton – trombone
- Will Thompson – drums
- DJ Kyriakides – trombone

== Discography ==
- Johnny Ray (2001)
- Don't Wait (2002)
- This Voice (2003)
- The Anti-Corporate Beach Party (2005)
- Departures (2009)
- The Anthemic Pandemic (2011)
- Time Dilation (2017)

=== Reviews ===
- Review of This Voice on CT Ska Productions
- Review of The Anti-Corporate Beach Party on CT Ska Productions
- Review of The Anti-Corporate Beach Party on Smother
