= The Forces of Evil =

American ska punk band

- Origin: Orange County, California, United States
- Genre: Ska punk
- Years active: 2001–2005
- Label: Jive
- Past members: Aaron Barrett; Justin Ferreira; Chris Colonnier; Derek Gibbs; Jay Lafayette; John Throop; John Christianson
- Website: web.archive.org/web/20061105031507/http://www.theforcesofevil-ska.com/

The Forces of Evil was an Orange County–based ska punk band, formed in January 2001 with the intention of creating a ska supergroup, being the side project of fellow ska punk band Reel Big Fish. The band released their only album, Friend or Foe?, in 2003. They split in 2005 after releasing a four-song EP, which was available on their website.

== History ==
Aaron Evil, guitar (Aaron Barrett), of Reel Big Fish fame, formed The Forces Of Evil in January 2001 by recruiting three members of the then recently defunct ska group Jeffries Fan Club at their farewell concert, Justin Evil, drums (Justin Ferreira), Chris Evil, trombone (Chris Colonnier) and Derek Evil, bass (Derek Gibbs). Jay Evil, trumpet (Jay Lafayette of The Scholars) and Jonny Evil, trombone (John Throop of Lone Raspberry) were later added to the line-up, and with the addition of friend John Evil, trumpet (John Christianson), the band was made complete.

According to Barrett, He created the Forces of Evil as a fall-back plan, as he believed that Reel Big Fish was going to tank after releasing Cheer Up!, thinking everyone would hate it. In the commentary for the Reel Big Fish DVD You're All In This Together, He said he started FoE because "if Reel Big Fish was over, then I'd still want to prove to everyone that I still love ska and love to play it."

Between formation and June 2002, the band played many concerts across the U.S., playing both songs written by the band and covers of other songs from many genres.

In June 2002, the band released their first record, an EP titled Because We Care..., featuring tracks that had seen popular receptions during concerts. The first album to be released by The Forces Of Evil appeared in October 2003, titled Friend or Foe? and featuring all of the tracks previously released on the EP as well as many new tracks, one of particular note being "Fight", which was the theme song for Ska Summit 2003, a huge achievement for such a newly formed band and one that served to increase the group's popularity not only in US Ska circles but also in Ska fans across the world. As such, the band was signed by Jive Records.

In 2005, The Forces Of Evil disbanded, while in the process of recording their second album for Jive Records. Finished songs from the planned album were later posted on the internet under the title Four Song Obituary.

Barrett later stated the work effort was too similar to the work he was doing with Reel Big Fish, and he decided to concentrate his efforts on the other band. Barrett also noted the president of Jive at the time of the release of Friend or Foe? was angered by the fact that it was not the new Reel Big Fish album, and wondered why it wasn't; former Reel Big Fish bassist Matt Wong said he wondered the same thing as well.

== Members ==
- Aaron Evil (Aaron Barrett) - Guitar, Lead Vocals (Reel Big Fish)
- Juston Evil (Justin Ferriera) - Drums (Jeffries Fan Club)
- Chris Evil (Chris Colonnier) - Trombone (Jeffries Fan Club)
- Derek Evil (Derek Gibbs) - Bass (Jeffries Fan Club)
- Jay Evil (Jay Lafayette) - Trumpet (the Scholars)
- Jonny Evil (John Throop) - Trombone (Lone Raspberry)
- John Evil (John Christianson) - Trumpet (Reel Big Fish)

== Discography ==
- Because We Care... (EP, 2002)
- Friend or Foe? (Album, 2003)
- "99 Hell" (Jay-Z Remix) (mp3 Download, 2004)
- "Ball & Chain" (Sublime cover) (Forever Free: Sublime Tribute, 2005)
- Four Song Obituary (EP, 2005)
