= The Hotknives =

English ska band

The Hotknives are an English ska band from Horsham in Sussex, England, formed in 1982.

The Hotknives are still touring, recording and taking bookings for shows.They regularly perform and often headline festivals throughout Europe and the World

The Hotknives are

Mark Carew… Bass Lead Vocal

Richard ‘Bosky’ Allen…Keyboard Vocal

Stuart Brown Guitar Vocal

Nigel Clements Drums Vocal

== Band history ==
The original lineup of the Hotknives existed between 1982 and 1993. They created three albums, the live albums Live at the Boatman and Live & Skankin, and the studio album The Way Things Are. Their catalogue of songs include the live favourites "Holsten Boys", "Don't Go Away", "Skin Up Harry", "Dave and Mary", "Driving Me Mad", "Julie Julie", "W.L.N.", "Alcoholic Nightmare", "One Man And His Dog", "Believe It", and "Man In The Cellar".

The band featured the vocals and songwriting talents of Mick Clare and Gary Marshall. Clare played guitar and occasional harmonica. Marshall played rhythm guitar. Lead guitarist Dave Clifton also had a hand in writing some songs. Kev Clements, who started out as keyboard player, also wrote some songs, and finished up on the trumpet. Micky Matthews played saxophone and did vocals on "Turkey Stomp" and "Double Barrel". Mick Merritt and Clemmy played bass and drums respectively. Jim Mills took over keyboard duties from Clements. Paul Mumford and Colin Jones provided additional saxophone at times through the band's history.

The original lineup split up in 1993 and reformed a year later, slimmed down to become a four piece band. This consisted of original members Mick Clare and Clemmy with Bosky (Richard Allen) and MarK Carew. Bosky was formerly in Brighton based ska band Too Many Crooks, and Carew continues to play with the Long Tall Texans.

In 1996 the band released their second studio album, Home, on Grover Records and in 2000 followed up with the studio album Screams, Dreams and Custard Creams. In 2003 the lineup changed when Mick Clare sadly left the band and was replaced by Stuart Brown on guitar, with Mark Carew taking over on lead vocals. In 2010 the band released their latest album, About Time.

In December 2014, a long lost recording emerged via the Facebook page "Fans of The Hotknives", Live & Erect, recorded live at Champagne's Nite Club in Horsham in August 1987. This featured 18 tracks, many of these which appeared on CD for the first time. These included "Dave's Song", "Recovery", "Knocking On Heaven's Door", and "Three Minute Warning". Former lead vocalist, bandleader and guitarist Gary Marshall, the man who formed the band, released his debut album "The Awakening" in April 2019. The album is chock-full of Gary's superb songwriting and is a real joy to behold. Former lead vocalist Mick Clare joined together with three former members of Cornish ska heroes Ska'd For Life to release the Squid 58 album "Dismantled" in 2008 and has since appeared as a guest on singles by Los Chicklets and The Lockdowners. Former bass man Mick Merritt, now residing in Auckland, New Zealand, continues to play and record with his ska/punk band Judge Fudge and the Skatterbrainz. Former Hotknives lead guitarist Dave Clifton records under the moniker of The Man On The Bridge and recently released his mini album of folky rocksteady gems "Million Miles Away". Former saxophonist Paul Mumford now Plies his trade with Brighton ska troubadours Too Many Crooks. In April 2023 a double album in tribute to The Hotknives was released on Specialized Records entitled "Living On Dreams And Custard Creams". The album featured 40 new versions of Hotknives songs performed by bands from 12 different countries, including tracks by members of the original line up of the band. The album was curated by Des Bowyer of the "Fans Of The Hotknives" Facebook fanpage, a long running and popular community of Hotknives fans. Artists who appear on the album include:- Dr Ring Ding, The Abruptors, Mick Clare, Gary Marshall, The Mighty Offbeats, Joe Scholes, Wersja De Lux, New Tonic, Smoke & Mirrors Soundsystem, Bosky, Spicy Roots, Los Chicklets, Judge Fudge & The Skatterbrainz, The Man On The Bridge, Soho-lites, The Exceptions, The Nicks, Intensified, Bakesys, Boss Riot, Loonee Toons and The Slapstickers to name but a few.

Current members:

- Mark Carew - vocals, bass
- Richard Allen - vocals, keyboards.
- Stuart Brown - guitar, backing vocals

The band do not currently have a permanent drummer. Dutch ska maestro Paul Berding regularly plays sax with the band.

== Historic Band members ==
The 1982 lineup:

- Gary Marshall
- Michael Clare
- Michael Matthews
- Michael Merritt
- Dave Clifton
- Kevin Clements
- Nigel Clements (Clemmy)

== Discography ==
=== Albums ===
Year	Title	Label
1988	Live at the Boatman	Off the head Records
1989	Live 'N' Skanking	Skank Records
1990	The Way Things Are	Unicorn Records
1996	Home	Grover Records
2000	Screams, Dreams, and Custard Creams	Grover Records
2010	About Time	Sunny Bastards
