= The Porkers =

Australian musical group

- Also known as: The Pork Hunts
- Origin: Newcastle, New South Wales, Australia
- Genres: Ska punk
- Years active: 1987–present
- Labels: Sound System, MoonSka
- Members: Pete Porker; Bigfil
- Past members: Richard Puxty; Tess Tickle; Tony Collins; Shane Simmonds; Ian Dunn; Justin Lipscombe; Chris Fegan; Dave Power; Martin McLaughlin; Ben Holland; Rob Parkes
- Website: theporkers.com.au

The Porkers are an Australian ska punk band from Newcastle, New South Wales, Australia.

Formed in 1987 as The Pork Hunts, the band was eventually forced to change its name to the less offensive-sounding The Porkers in 1990 after their regular Newcastle venue refused to present them under their old name. Because of this, their first release was the 1990 EP entitled Tired of Being Pork Hunts, which reached No. 6 on the Australian independent charts.

In 1994, their debut album Grunt! received rave reviews and entered the American market through Moon Ska Records. The album was a mixture of studio and live tracks, and included covers of Devo's Mongoloid and Radio Birdman's Aloha Steve and Danno.

The Porkers have toured extensively throughout Australia, New Zealand, the United States, Germany and Japan (a live album recorded in Japan was released in 2004). In Australia, they have supported groups such as No Doubt, Fishbone, the Mighty Mighty Bosstones and Rancid.

After over twenty years, there have been numerous changes in The Porkers' line-up, but two of the original members are still in the band: frontman Pete Porker, and Bigfil on saxophone.

After a five-year hiatus (2009–2014), The Porkers returned in 2014 with a fresh line-up after being invited to play the Soundwave festival tour by A.J. Maddah. They opened the main stage in every city.

In 2018, Pete Porker suffered a stroke, but shortly thereafter resumed duties on stage with the band.

== Discography ==
- Tired of Being Pork Hunts - EP (1990)
- Grunt! (1994)
- Not Bad, Pretty Good, Not Bad (1996)
- Hit the Ground Running - EP (1996)
- X-Factor - EP (1997)
- Chemical Imbalance - EP (1997)
- Hot Dog Daiquiri (1998)
- Perfect Teeth - EP (1998)
- Too Big For Your Boots- EP (2000)
- Time Will Tell (2000)
- The Porkers vs Salmonelladub - EP (2001)
- Buds for Brains - EP (2002)
- Now Hear This - EP (2004)
- Live at Nakanoshima (2005)
- This is The Porkers (2007)
- Persistence is Futile - DVD (2009)
