= Ska =

Music genre

- Stylistic origins: Mento; jazz; New Orleans rhythm and blues
- Cultural origins: Late 1950s, Jamaica
- Derivative forms: Rocksteady; reggae; dancehall

Fusion genres
- 2 tone; ska jazz; ska pop; ska punk; skacore; spouge; Christian ska

Regional scenes
- Japan; Australia; United States; United Kingdom

Other topics
- Third-wave ska; list of ska musicians; rude boy; mod; skinhead; suedehead; traditional skinhead

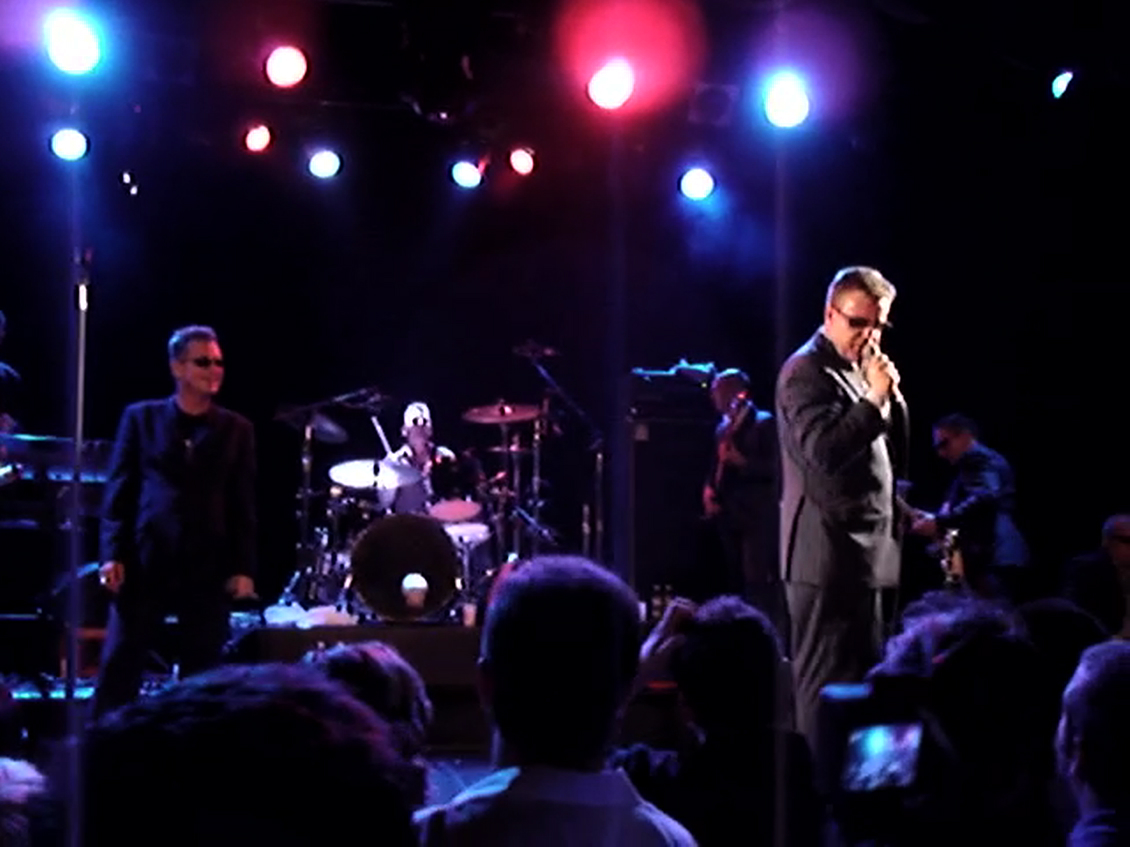
Madness performing in 2005

Ska (/skɑː/; Jamaican Patois: skia, [skjæ]) is a music genre that originated in Jamaica in the late 1950s and was the precursor to rocksteady and reggae. It combined elements of Caribbean mento (sometimes referred to as calypso) with American jazz and rhythm and blues. Ska is characterized by a walking bass line accented with rhythms on the off beat. It was developed in Jamaica in the 1960s when Stranger Cole, Prince Buster, Clement "Coxsone" Dodd, and Duke Reid formed sound systems to play American rhythm and blues and then began recording their own songs. In the early 1960s, ska was the dominant music genre of Jamaica and was popular with British mods and with many skinheads.

Music historians typically divide the history of ska into three periods: the original Jamaican scene of the 1960s; the 2 tone ska revival of the late 1970s in Britain, which fused Jamaican ska rhythms and melodies with the faster tempos and harder edge of punk rock forming ska-punk; and third-wave ska, which involved bands from a wide range of countries around the world, in the late 1980s and 1990s.

== Etymology ==
There are multiple theories about the origins of the word ska. Ernest Ranglin claimed that the term was coined by musicians to refer to the "skat! skat! skat!" scratching guitar strum. Another explanation is that at a recording session in 1959 produced by Coxsone Dodd, double bassist Cluett Johnson instructed guitarist Ranglin to "play like ska, ska, ska", although Ranglin has denied this, stating "Clue couldn't tell me what to play!" A further theory is that it derives from Johnson's word skavoovie, with which he was known to greet his friends. Jackie Mittoo insisted that the musicians called the rhythm Staya Staya, and that it was Byron Lee who introduced the term "ska". Derrick Morgan said: "Guitar and piano making a ska sound, like 'ska, ska".

== History ==
=== Jamaican ska ===
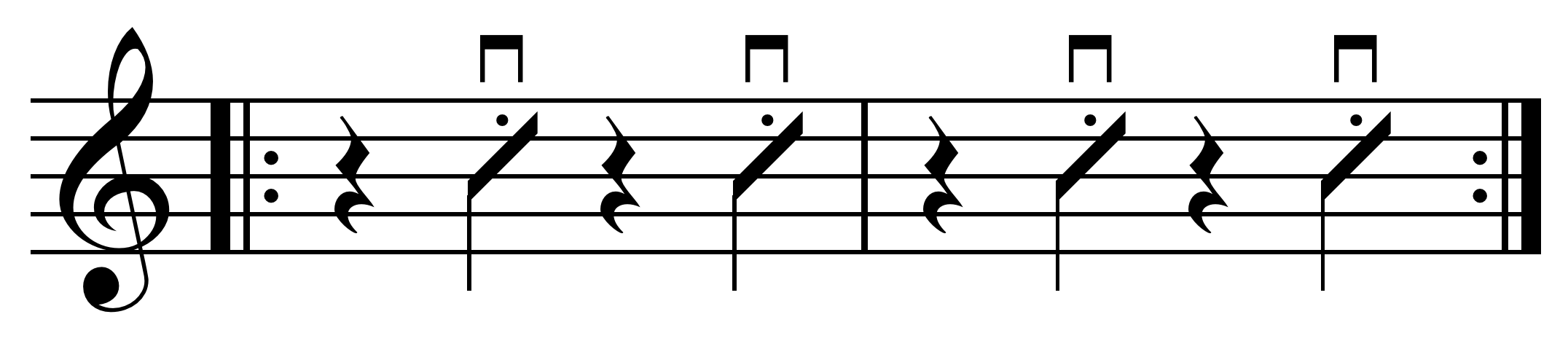
Quarter note "skank" guitar rhythm, named onomatopoetically for its sound.

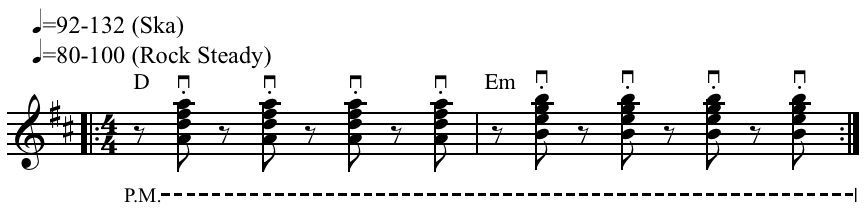
Eighth note skank rhythm

After World War II, Jamaicans purchased radios in increasing numbers and were able to hear rhythm and blues music from the Southern United States in cities such as New Orleans by artists such as Fats Domino, Barbie Gaye, Rosco Gordon and Louis Jordan whose early recordings all contain the seeds of the "behind-the-beat" feel of ska and reggae. The stationing of American military forces during and after the war meant that Jamaicans could listen to military broadcasts of American music, and there was a constant influx of records from the United States. To meet the demand for that music, entrepreneurs such as Prince Buster, Coxsone Dodd, and Duke Reid formed sound systems.

As the supply of previously unheard tunes in the jump blues and more traditional R&B genres began to dry up in the late 1950s, Jamaican producers began recording their own version of the genres with local artists. These recordings were initially made to be played on "soft wax" (a lacquer on metal disc acetate later to become known as a "dub plate"), but as demand for them grew eventually sometime in the second half of 1959 (believed by most to be in the last quarter) producers such as Coxsone Dodd and Duke Reid began to issue these recordings on 45 rpm 7-inch discs. At this point, the style was a direct copy of the American "shuffle blues" style, but within two or three years it had morphed into the more familiar ska style with the off-beat guitar chop that could be heard in some of the more uptempo late-1950s American rhythm and blues recordings such as Domino's "Be My Guest" and Barbie Gaye's "My Boy Lollypop", both of which were popular on Jamaican sound systems of the late 1950s. Domino's rhythm, accentuating the offbeat, was a particular influence.

This "classic" ska style was of bars made up of four triplets but was characterized by a guitar chop on the off beat—known as an upstroke or 'skank'—with horns taking the lead and often following the off-beat skank and piano emphasizing the bass line and, again, playing the skank. Drums kept 4/4 time and the bass drum was accented on the third beat of each four-triplet phrase. The snare would play side stick and accent the third beat of each 4-triplet phrase. The upstroke sound can also be found in other Caribbean forms of music, such as mento and calypso. Ernest Ranglin asserted that the difference between R&B and ska beats is that the former goes "chink-ka" and the latter goes "ka-chink".

The Jamaican ska outfit the Skatalites recorded "Dynamite", "Ringo" and "Guns of Navarone". One theory about the origin of ska is that Prince Buster created it during the inaugural recording session for his new record label Wild Bells. The session was financed by Duke Reid, who was supposed to get half of the songs to release. The guitar began emphasizing the second and fourth beats in the bar, giving rise to the new sound. The drums were taken from traditional Jamaican drumming and marching styles. To create the ska beat, Prince Buster essentially flipped the R&B shuffle beat, stressing the offbeats with the help of the guitar. Prince Buster has explicitly cited American rhythm and blues as the origin of ska: specifically, Willis Jackson's song "Later for the Gator" (which was Coxsone Dodd's number one selection).

The first ska recordings were created at facilities such as Federal Records, Studio One, and WIRL Records in Kingston, Jamaica with producers such as Dodd, Reid, Prince Buster, and Edward Seaga. The ska sound coincided with the celebratory feelings surrounding Jamaica's independence from the UK in 1962; an event commemorated by songs such as Derrick Morgan's "Forward March" and the Skatalites' "Freedom Sound".

Until Jamaica ratified the Berne Convention for the Protection of Literary and Artistic Works, the country did not honor international music copyright protection. This created many cover songs and reinterpretations. One such cover was Millie Small's version of the R&B/shuffle tune, "My Boy Lollypop", first recorded in New York in 1956 by 14-year-old Barbie Gaye. Small's rhythmically similar version, released in 1964, was Jamaica's first commercially successful international hit. With over seven million copies sold, it remains one of the best selling reggae/ska songs of all time. Many other Jamaican artists would have success recording instrumental ska versions of popular American and British music, such as Beatles songs, Motown and Atlantic soul hits, movie theme songs and instrumentals (007, Guns of Navarone). The Wailers covered the Beatles' "And I Love Her", and radically reinterpreted Bob Dylan's "Like a Rolling Stone". They also created their own versions of Latin-influenced music from artists such as Mongo Santamaría. The Skatalites, Lord Creator, Laurel Aitken, Roland Alphonso, Tommy McCook, Jackie Mittoo, Desmond Dekker, and Don Drummond also recorded ska.

Byron Lee & the Dragonaires performed ska with Prince Buster, Eric "Monty" Morris, and Jimmy Cliff at the 1964 New York World's Fair. As music changed in the United States, so did ska. In 1965 and 1966, when American soul music became slower and smoother, ska changed its sound accordingly and evolved into rocksteady. However, rocksteady's heyday was brief, peaking in 1967. By 1968, ska evolved again into reggae.

=== 2 tone ===
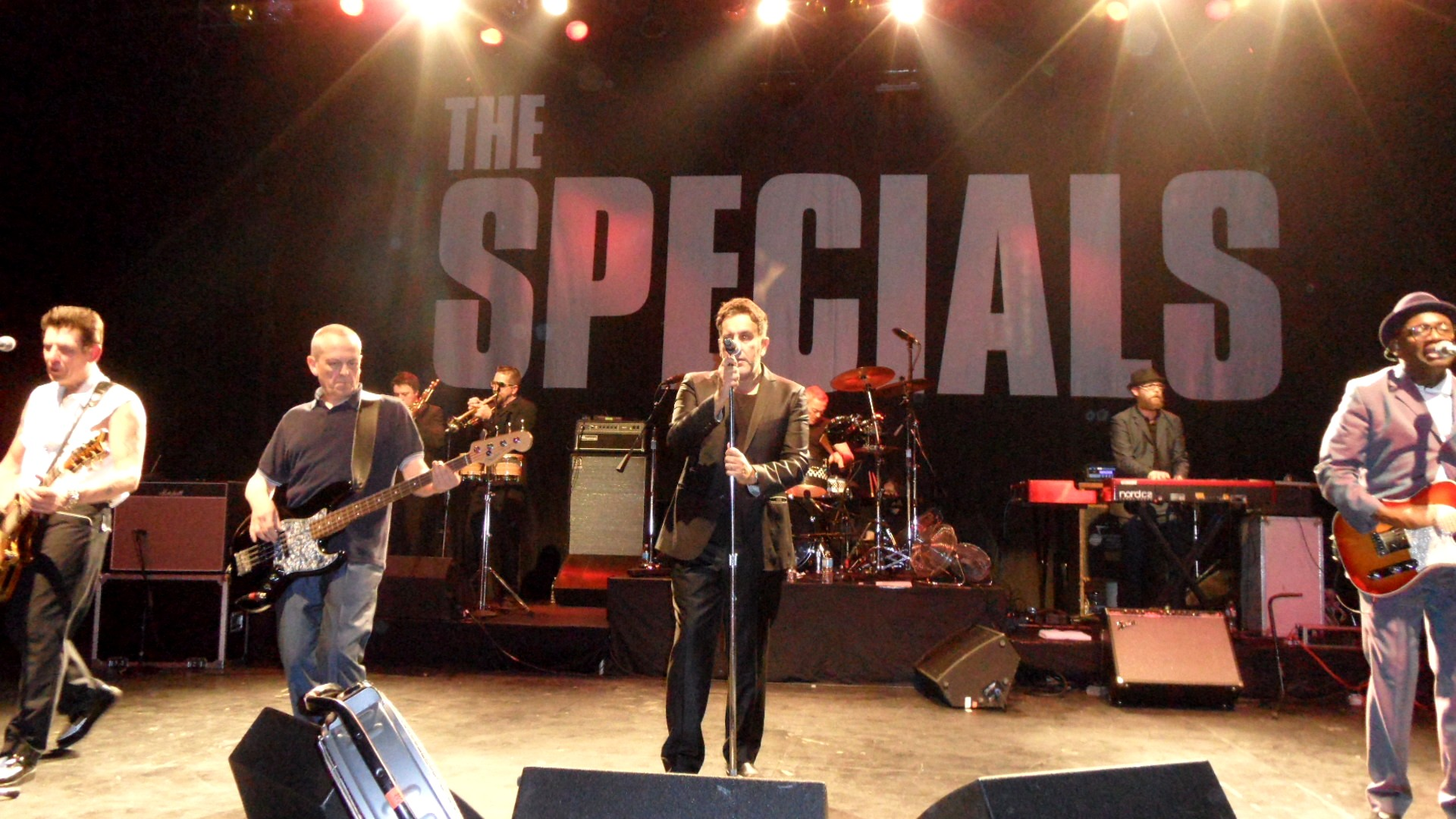
The Specials

The 2 tone genre, which began in the late 1970s in the Coventry area of UK, was a fusion of Jamaican ska rhythms and melodies with punk rock's more aggressive guitar chords and lyrics. Compared to 1960s ska, 2 tone music had faster tempos, fuller instrumentation, and a harder edge. The genre was named after 2 Tone Records, a record label founded by Jerry Dammers of the Specials. In many cases, the reworking of classic ska songs turned the originals into hits again in the United Kingdom. The Specials recorded "A Message to You Rudy" in 1979, featuring Rico Rodriguez, who played trombone on both the original Dandy Livingstone recording and the Specials' version.

The 2 tone movement promoted racial unity at a time when racial tensions were high in England. There were many Specials songs that raised awareness of the issues of racism, fighting and friendship. Riots in English cities were a feature during the summer that the Specials song "Ghost Town" was a hit, although this work was in a slower, reggae beat. Most of the 2 tone bands had multiracial lineups, such as the Beat (known as the English Beat in North America and Australia), the Specials, and the Selecter. Although only on the 2 tone label for one single, Madness was one of the most effective bands at bringing the 2 tone genre into the mainstream, with hits such as "One Step Beyond", "Night Boat to Cairo", and "Our House". The music of this era resonated with white working class youth and West Indian immigrants who experienced the struggles addressed in the lyrics.

=== Third-wave ska ===
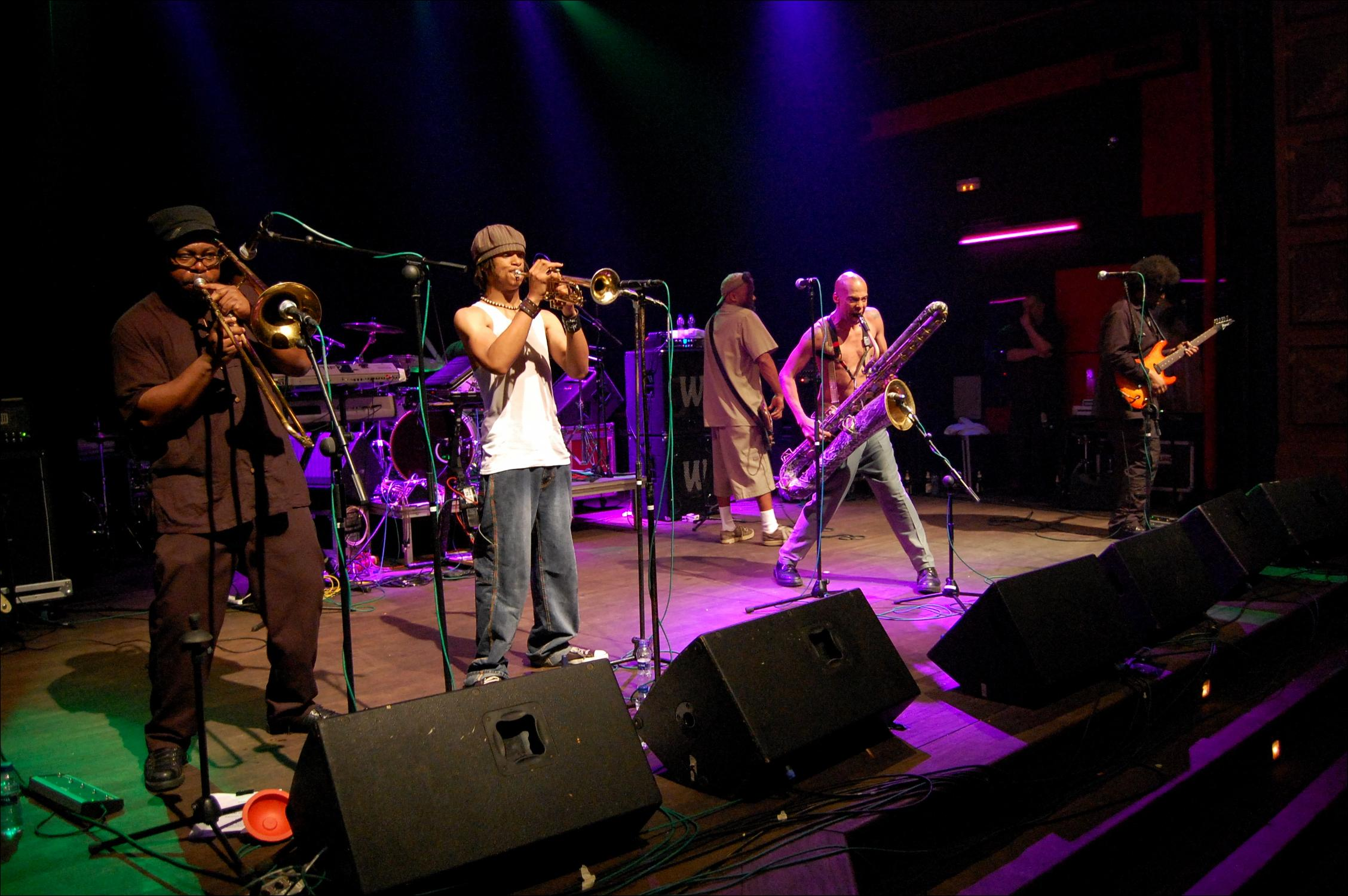
Fishbone playing in Los Angeles

Ska historian Albino Brown (of the radio program The Ska Parade) coined the term third-wave ska in 1989 and helped to catalyze such multi-platinum bands as No Doubt and Sublime. Third-wave ska or West Coast skaoriginated in the punk scene in the late 1980s and became commercially successful in the 1990s. Although some third-wave ska has a traditional 1960s sound, most third-wave ska is characterized by dominating guitar riffs and large horn sections.

==== United Kingdom ====
By the late 1980s, ska had experienced a minor resurgence of popularity in the United Kingdom, due to bands such as the Burial and the Hotknives. The 1980s and 1990s also heralded many ska festivals, and a re-emergence of the traditional skinhead subculture.

==== Europe ====
The early 1980s saw a massive surge in ska's popularity in Germany, leading to the founding of many German ska bands like the Busters, record labels and festivals.

In Spain, ska gained relevance in the 80s, first in some songs by groups like Ejecutivos agresivos and Los Cardiacos, but where it really gained strength was in the Basque Country due to the influence of Basque Radical Rock, with Kortatu and Potato being the most representatives bands. Skalariak and Betagarri followed in the early 1990s and their influence is visible outside the Basque Country in punk-rock bands like Ska-P, Boikot and many others that have gained importance in the Spanish rock and punk rock scene and festivals.

==== Australia ====
The Australian ska scene flourished in the mid-1980s, following the musical precedents set by 2 tone, and spearheaded by bands such as the Porkers. Some of the Australian ska revival bands found success on the national music charts, most notably Allniters, who had a number 10 hit with a ska cover of "Montego Bay" in 1983. The 30 piece Melbourne Ska Orchestra has enjoyed success in recent years, touring internationally, including sets at Glastonbury and Montreux Jazz Festival.

==== Russia and Japan ====
A Russian (then-Soviet) ska scene was established in the mid-1980s in Saint Petersburg as a kind of anglophone opposition to more traditional Russian rock music. Strannye Igry, AVIA and N.O.M. were among the first bands of genre. Then bands like Spitfire, Distemper, Leningrad and Markscheider Kunst became popular and commercially successful in Russia and abroad in the late 1990s.

Japan established its own ska scene, colloquially referred to as J-ska, in the mid-1980s. The Tokyo Ska Paradise Orchestra, formed in 1985, have been one of the most commercially successful progenitors of Japanese ska.

==== The Americas ====
Latin America's ska scene started developing in the mid-1980s. Latin American ska bands typically play traditional ska rhythms blended with strong influences from Latin music and rock en Español. The most prominent bands include the Grammy nominated Desorden Público from Venezuela and Grammy awarded Los Fabulosos Cadillacs from Argentina, who scored an international hit single with "El Matador" in 1994.

By the early 1980s, 2 tone–influenced ska bands began forming throughout the United States. The Uptones from Berkeley, California, and the Toasters from New York City—both formed in 1981—were among the first active ska bands in North America. They are both credited with laying the groundwork for American ska and establishing scenes in their respective regions. In Los Angeles around the same time, the Untouchables also formed. While many of the early American ska bands continued in the musical traditions set by 2 tone and the mod revival, bands such as Fishbone, the Mighty Mighty Bosstones and Operation Ivy pioneered the American ska punk subgenre, a fusion of ska and punk rock that typically downplayed ska's R&B influence in favor of faster tempos and guitar distortion. In 1986, No Doubt, a ska punk band was formed. They were one of the more mainstream ska bands that set the stage for many up and coming bands.

Two hotspots for the United States' burgeoning ska scenes were New York City and Orange County, California. In New York, Toasters frontman Robert "Bucket" Hingley formed the independent record label Moon Ska Records in 1983. The label quickly became the largest independent ska label in the United States. The Orange County ska scene was a major breeding ground for ska punk and more contemporary pop-influenced ska music, personified by bands such as Reel Big Fish and Sublime. It was here that the term third-wave ska was coined and popularized by Albino Brown and Tazy Phyllipz (hosts of the Ska Parade radio show) to describe the new wave of ska-influenced bands which were steadily gaining notoriety; and Brown wrote the first treatise on ska's third wave in 1994. The San Francisco Bay Area also contributed to ska's growing popularity, with Skankin' Pickle, Let's Go Bowling and the Dance Hall Crashers becoming known on the touring circuit.

The mid-1990s saw a considerable rise in ska music's underground popularity, marked by the formation of many ska-based record labels, booking organizations and indie zines. While Moon Ska was still the largest of the United States' ska labels, other notable labels included Jump Up Records of Chicago, which covered the thriving midwest scene, and Steady Beat Recordings of Los Angeles, which covered Southern California's traditional ska revival. Stomp Records of Montreal was Canada's primary producer and distributor of ska music. Additionally, many punk and indie rock labels, such as Hellcat Records and Fueled by Ramen, broadened their scope to include both ska and ska punk bands. Asian Man Records (formerly Dill Records), founded in 1996, started out primarily releasing ska punk albums before branching out to other music styles.

In 1993, the Mighty Mighty Bosstones signed with Mercury Records, becoming the first American ska punk band to find mainstream commercial success, with their 1994 album Question the Answers achieving gold record status and peaking at number 138 on the Billboard 200. In 1995, punk band Rancid, featuring former members of Operation Ivy, released the ska punk single "Time Bomb", which reached number 8 on the Billboard Modern Rock Tracks, becoming the first major ska punk hit of the 1990s and launching the genre into the public eye. Over the next few years, a string of notable ska and ska-influenced singles became hits on mainstream radio, including "Sell Out" by Reel Big Fish and "The Impression That I Get" by the Mighty Mighty Bosstones, all of whom would reach platinum status with each of their respective albums. By 1996, third-wave ska was one of the most popular forms of alternative music in the United States.

By the late 1990s, mainstream interest in third-wave ska bands waned as other music genres gained momentum. Moon Ska Records folded in 2000, but Moon Ska Europe, a licensed affiliate based in Europe, continued operating in the 2000s and was later relaunched as Moon Ska World. In 2003, Hingley launched a new ska record label, Megalith Records.

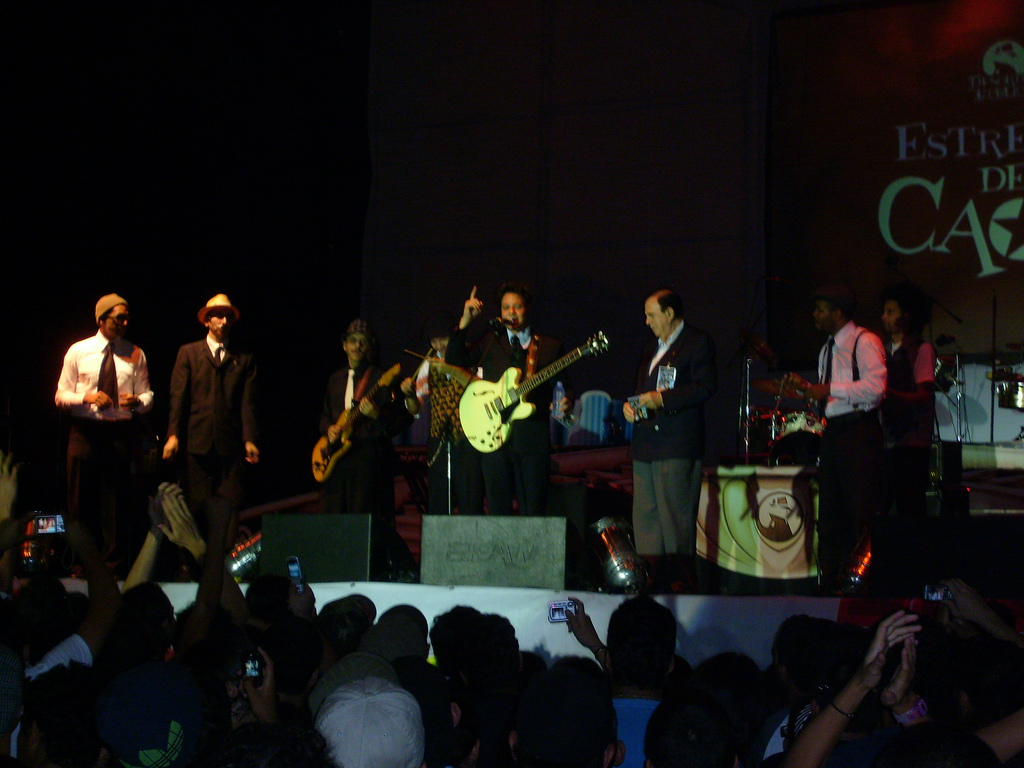
Desorden Publico, which are from Caracas, Venezuela, formed in 1985.

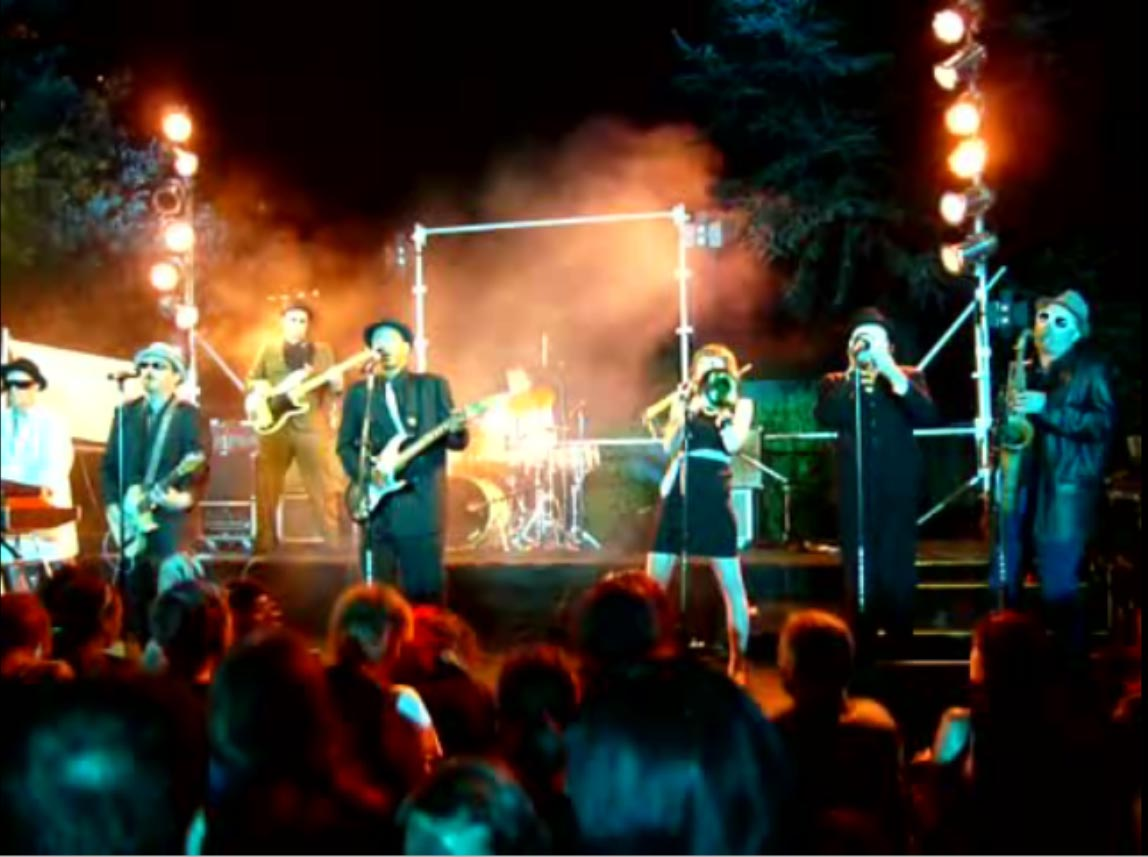
The Uptones, which are from Berkeley, California, formed in 1981.

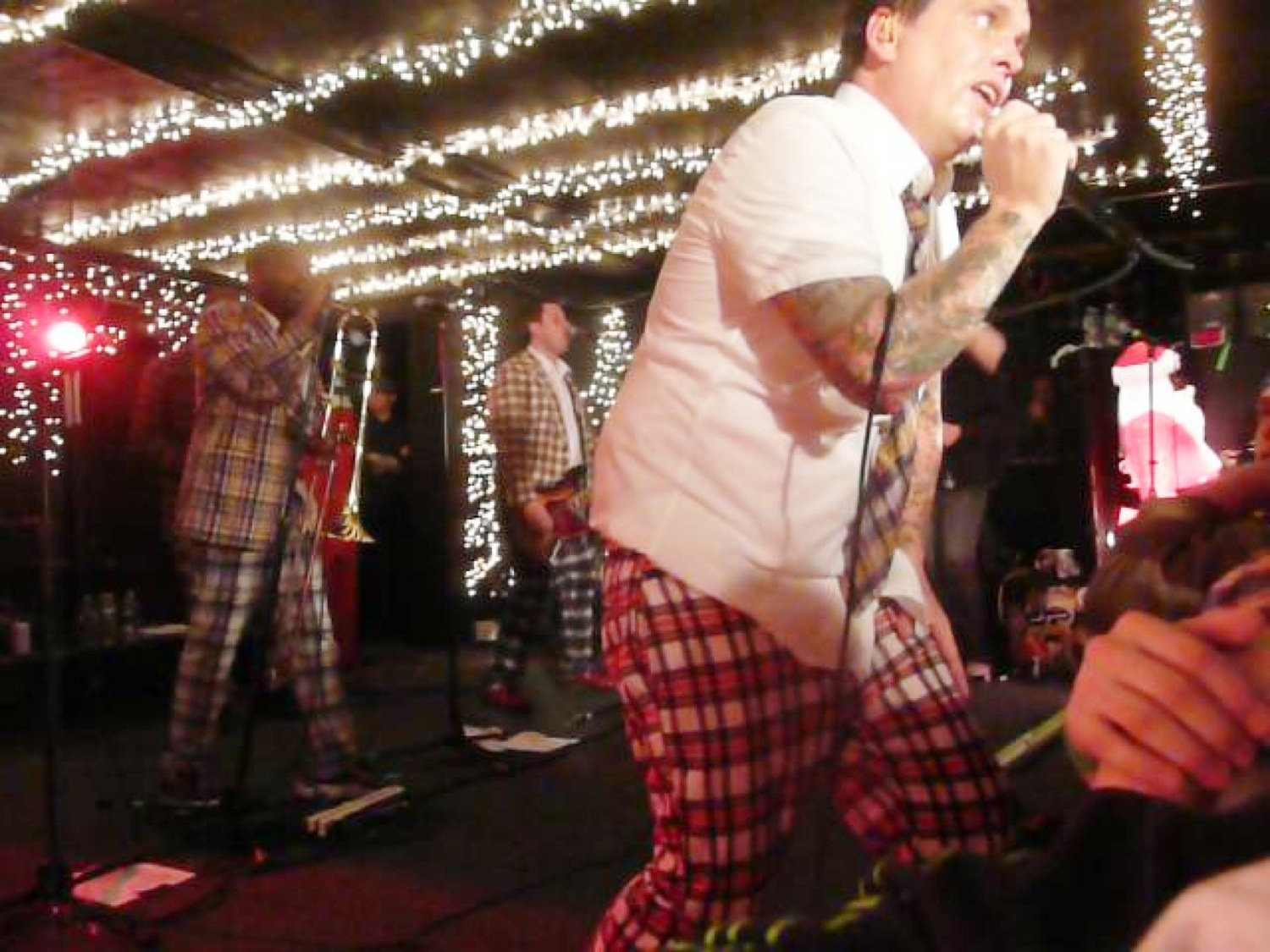
The Mighty Mighty Bosstones in their typical plaid outfits

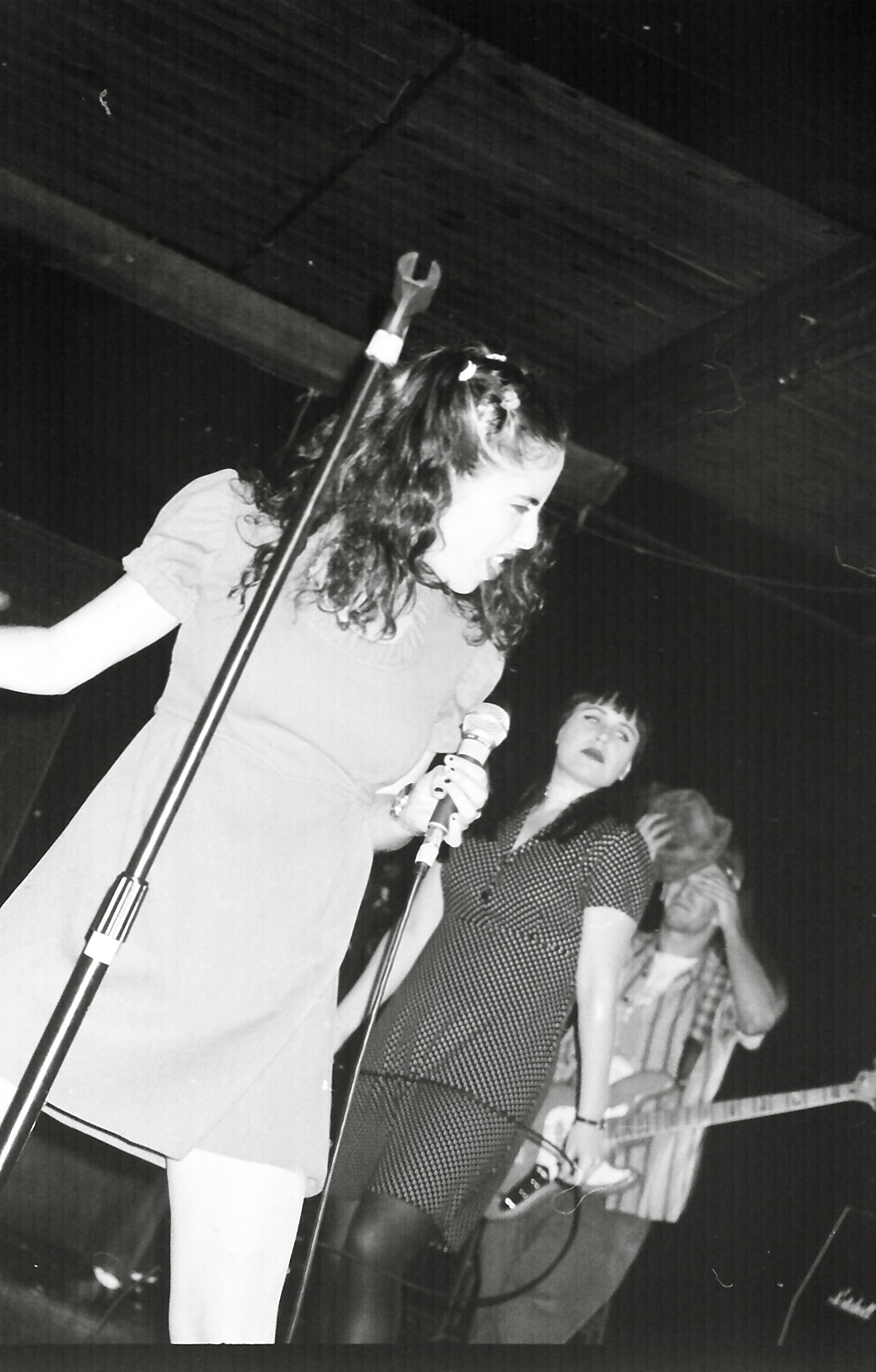
The Dance Hall Crashers in 1998

=== Post–third-wave ska ===
In the early 21st century, ska was mostly absent from the radio, though there were exceptions. In 2017, Captain SKA reached number 4 on the UK Singles Chart with "Liar Liar GE2017". In 2018, the Interrupters broke into the U.S. charts with their single "She's Kerosene". By 2019, several publications started speculating about whether a "fourth wave" of ska was about to emerge.

== See also ==
- Christian ska
- List of ska musicians
- Rude boy
- Skank (dance)
