= Scream Real Loud...Live! =

Live album by 7 Seconds
- Released: 2000
- Genre: Hardcore punk; skate punk
- Label: Side One Dummy

7 Seconds chronology
Good To Go (1999)	Scream Real Loud...Live! (2000)	Take It Back, Take It On, Take It Over! (2005)

Scream Real Loud...Live! is a live album by American hardcore punk band 7 Seconds, recorded in 2000.

== Track listing ==
Track	Title	Time	Originally released on
1	Sooner or Later	1:17	Good To Go
2	Not Just Boy's Fun	1:41	The Crew
3	F.O.F.O.D.	0:26	Short Music For Short People
4	Message From A Friend	1:41	Good To Go
5	Ghost	1:58	The Music, The Message
6	Here's Your Warning	1:12	The Crew
7	Definite Choice	0:56	The Crew
8	Slow Down A Second	1:59	Good To Go
9	One Big Guessing Game	1:52	Good To Go
10	Committed For Life	1:21	Committed For Life (EP) (later repackaged on alt.music.hardcore)
11	If The Kids Are United	2:47	alt.music.hardcore
12	You Lose	0:31	The Crew
13	Young 'til I Die	2:52	The Crew
14	Here We Go Again, Kids	3:45	Good To Go
15	Satyagraha	3:22	Soulforce Revolution
16	The Crew	0:46	The Crew
17	Remains To Be Seen	1:23	Walk Together, Rock Together
18	Regress, No Way	1:56	Walk Together, Rock Together
19	Red & Black	0:36	The Crew
20	Die Hard	1:16	The Crew
21	99 Red Balloons	6:12	Walk Together, Rock Together
22	In Your Face	1:06	Walk Together, Rock Together
23	Trust	2:26	The Crew
24	Never Try	1:44	Good To Go
25	Walk Together, Rock Together	2:04	Walk Together, Rock Together
