= Sonic Boom Six =

English five-piece band

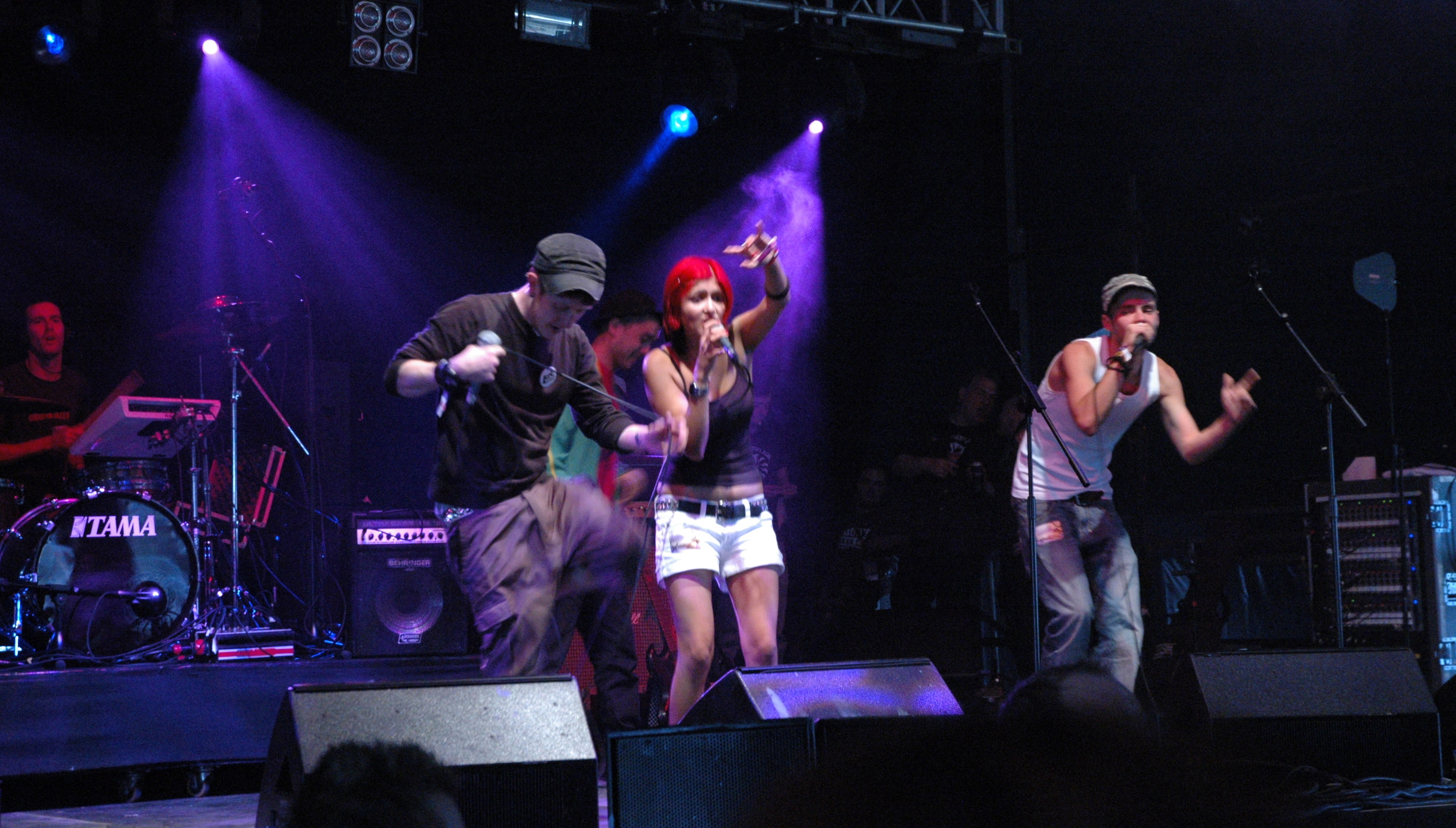

Background information
- Origin: Manchester, England
- Genres: Punk rock, ska, ragga, hip hop, electronic
- Years active: 2002–present
- Labels: Xtra Mile (UK); Rebel Alliance Recordings (UK); Deck Cheese (UK); Pyropit (Japan); Asbestos (USA); Guerilla Asso (France)
- Members: Paul "Barney" Barnes; Nick Horne; Laila Khan; Luke Hesketh
- Past members: Ben Childs; Dave Kelly; James Routh; Neil "Macca" McMinn; Matthew Reynolds (temporary member)
- Website: sonicboomsix.co.uk

Sonic Boom Six (often shortened to SB6) are an English five-piece band from Manchester. Their eclectic sound combines different elements of several genres and has been described by Kerrang! as "taking ska, pop, grime, dubstep, punk and metal apart, then rebuilding them as a hyperactive hybrid". Their lyrics tend to focus on social commentary with a live show known for "clashing activism and good times". The band's influences include Bad Brains, Public Enemy, The Fugees, The Specials, The Streets, and The Clash.

== Career ==
=== Early years (2002–2004) ===
Sonic Boom Six first appeared on the Manchester punk scene in April 2002. Some of their members were previously in the band Grimace. Their self-titled demo, recorded with Jerry Melchers, was self-released in October 2002. To promote the CD, they toured the UK with second wave ska veterans The Toasters and London ska punk/hip hop band King Prawn. They also toured with Coolie Ranx and performed as his backing band. In September 2003, they released The Turbo EP, their first release for Moon Ska Europe. This was produced by Ace (of Skunk Anansie) and Christophe. After a series of good reviews, Sonic Boom Six were invited to perform a session on BBC Radio One's The Lock Up.

After further touring with Catch 22, as well as on the Moon Ska Launchpad Tour 2004 (alongside Zen Baseballbat, Graveltrap, Babar Luck and Dumpster Pop), the band re-united with Ace and Christophe to record their second EP. Sounds to Consume was released on Moon Ska Europe in August 2004, and include the Turbo EP as bonus tracks. After tour dates with Leftöver Crack and The Suicide Machines, the band appeared on BBC2's Asian arts programme Desi DNA performing in a scrapyard, as well as being interviewed by Adil Ray for his show on the BBC Asian Network.

=== Deck Cheese to Rebel Alliance (2005–2009) ===
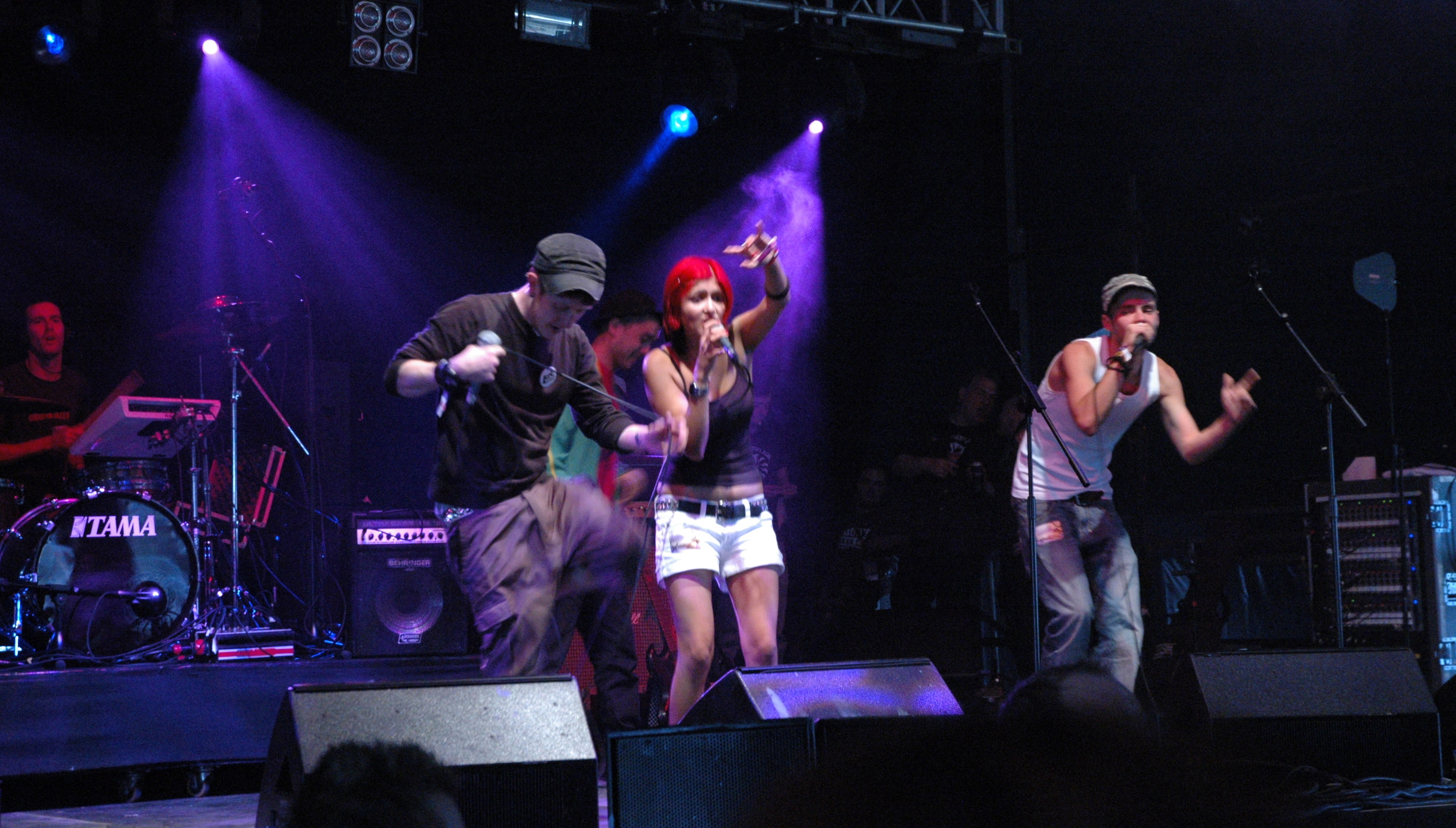
Sonic Boom Six performing "All In" with Itch of The King Blues. Leeds Festival, Bramham Park, 27 August 2006

In early February 2005, Sonic Boom Six replaced guitarist Dave "Hellfire" Kelly with guitarist Ben Childs, who used to play sax, thus making SB6 a four-piece. Ben's old saxophone parts were played through a sampler when performing live, or by musicians from other bands, such as Grown at Home and The Flaming Tsunamis. In 2005, the band opened the Love Music Hate Racism event on the Leftfield Stage at the Glastonbury Festival, played Belgium's Sortie 23 festival and performed at the premier of the Rock Against Racism film Who Shot the Sheriff? with HARD-Fi and Roll Deep. 2005 also saw the release of the Champion Edition of Sounds to Consume, which featured four of their original demo tracks (remixed by Tim G), three remixes, an acoustic track and a video. They also embarked on several dates on the inaugural Good To Go Tour alongside The Aquabats and Never Heard of It.

In 2006, the band recorded their second session for BBC Radio 1's The Lock Up, which was broadcast on 27 June. They were joined by Pete and Tucker from Jesse James and Itch from The King Blues. Their debut full-length album, The Ruff Guide to Genre-Terrorism, was released on 10 July 2006 on London label Deck Cheese Records, also home at the time to Phinius Gage, Sick On The Bus and Jesse James. In August 2006 the band played the Reading and Leeds Festivals as a last minute replacement for Paramore. They were joined again by Itch of The King Blues for a performance of "All In" (singing the parts of the song written by Coolie Ranx) and Nick 'The Blade' Horne of Howards Alias, partner of vocalist Laila, who played trombone on the songs "Bigger Than Punk Rock" and "Until the Sunlight Comes".

In February 2007 the band embarked on the inaugural Ruff and Ready Tour, a multi-band package tour put together by Sonic Boom Six. This initial tour featured the band with support from The King Blues, Failsafe and Mouthwash.

In May 2007 they played at the Slam Dunk Festival at Leeds University Union with Paramore and Reel Big Fish. During Reel Big Fish's set, Laila joined the band on stage to sing parts of "She Has a Girlfriend Now" alongside Aaron Barrett. She joined them again during Reel Big Fish's Monkeys for Nothin' winter tour in 2008. They played the Reading and Leeds Festivals again in 2007, on the Lock Up stage, playing not only their own material but covering the song "Sound System" by Operation Ivy. During this song, Itch from the King Blues once again joined them on stage to sing it. November 2007 saw the release of the band's second full-length CD, Arcade Perfect, on their own Rebel Alliance Recordings.

In May 2008 the band embarked on the Rude Awakening 2008 tour, alongside Big D and the Kids Table and Random Hand. 2008 also saw a second Ruff and Ready tour. This was followed by the release of a remixes, b-sides and rarities album entitled Play On: Rare, Rejected and Arcade Perfected, which the band toured in support of in late 2008. Nick Horne also joined the band as a full-time member, now playing guitar and bass live as well as trombone. They played at the Hevy Music Festival on 1 August 2009.

The second tour Ruff and Ready Tour began in October 2008, again with SB6 headlining, and this time with support from Chris Murray, The JB Conspiracy and Chief.

In May 2009 Sonic Boom Six released their third album City of Thieves, once again on Rebel Alliance Recordings. August 2009 saw Sonic Boom Six open the Main Stage at the Reading and Leeds Festival.

=== Childs's departure and Sonic Boom Six (2009–2015) ===
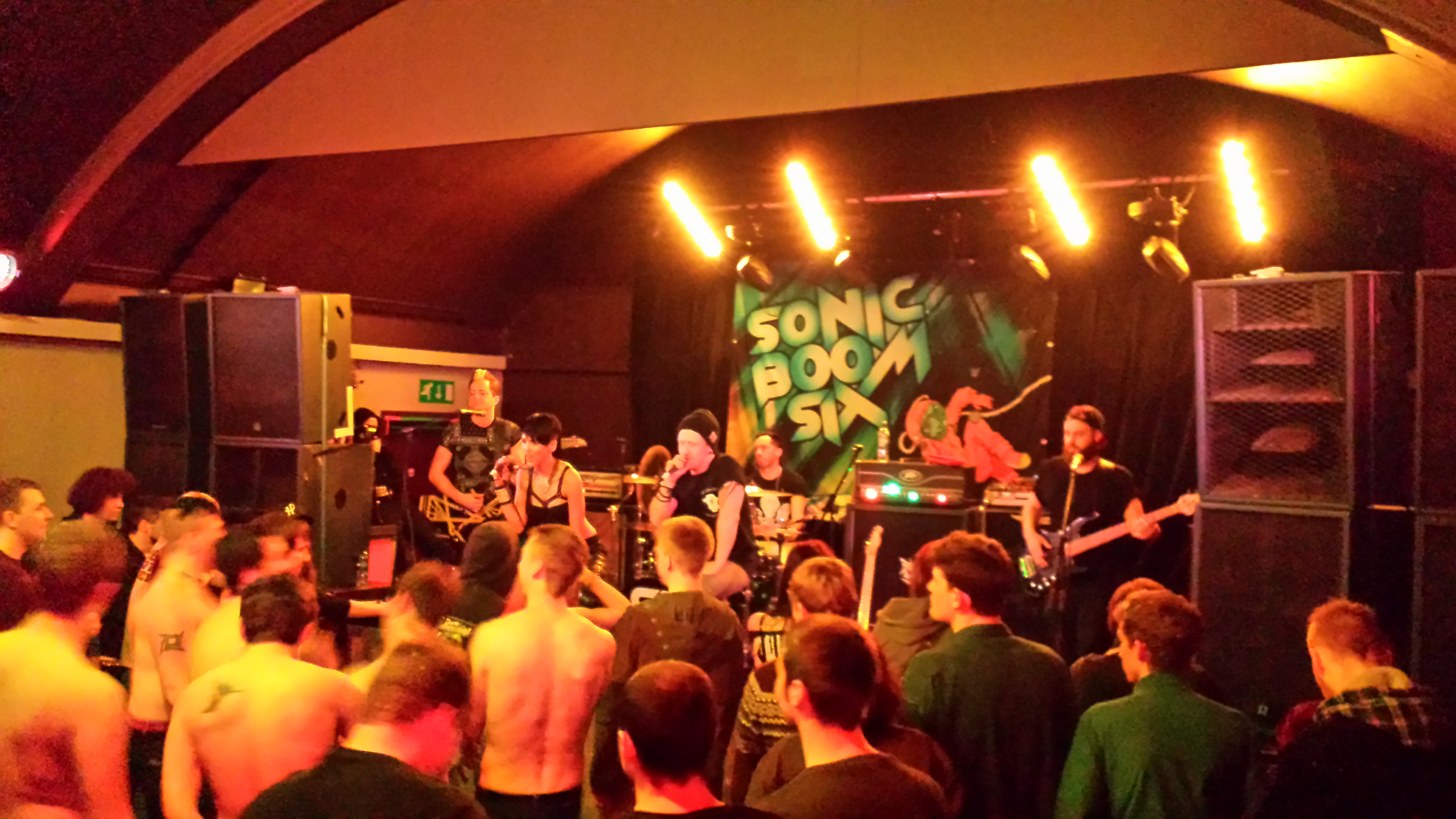
The band performing in Birmingham in February 2014

On 8 October 2009, it was announced on the band's official website that Ben Childs would be leaving the band after the forthcoming "Boom or Bust" tour and that he would be temporarily replaced by Matthew Reynolds – current vocalist and guitarist with rock band Drawings and also formerly of Howards Alias. In February 2010 new permanent member James "Jimmy T Boom" Routh, formerly of Myth of Unity, joined the band on guitar. Lee Hartney from The Smith Street Band joined the band on two tours in 2011, playing guitar & keytar.

On 4 February 2012, in a radio interview with Matt Stocks on Kerrang Radio, Paul Barnes and Laila Khan announced that their new album would be eponymous.

During a free gig sponsored by HP Live and Last FM at The Roadhouse in Manchester on 19 April 2012 Barney Boom/Paul Barnes announced that the band were due to sign a deal the following Saturday and that the new album would be released in September 2012.

Sonic Boom Six played the main stage at 2000 Trees Festival in Gloucestershire on 13 July 2012.

=== McMinn's departure and The F-Bomb (2015 to present) ===
It was announced on 14 May 2015 on their official site and via their Facebook page that founding member Neil "Macca" McMinn had decided to leave the band as he wanted a new challenge after 12 years with the band. The release of Sonic Boom Six's next album was delayed to allow the band time to recruit a replacement drummer.

It was confirmed on 21 May 2015 that Luke Hesketh would be taking over drumming duties from Neil McMinn. Luke, along with bandmate James Routh, would be splitting his time between Sonic Boom Six and The Karma Party.

After receiving funding via the PledgeMusic crowdfunding website the release date of the fifth album The F-Bomb is 27 May 2016, on Cherry Red Records.

In June 2017, the band released an eight track 'mini-album' Cardiac Address. The record was funded via crowdfunding, as with the preceding release. It featured a less produced and more aggressive sound. Funds raised supported the bands Vans Warped American tour, June through August.

== Sponsorship ==
Sonic Boom Six have had sponsorship from Jägermeister. This has taken the form of running a competition to see the band and featuring the band on their website. The video for Virus was sponsored by the drinks company along with Orange Amps and Gibson Guitars.

== Other projects ==
=== Babyboom ===
Sonic Boom Six previously performed acoustically under the name Babyboom, and recorded a self-titled EP in February 2006. Whilst the band (with their current line-up) do occasionally play acoustically, it is usually billed as "Sonic Boom Six Acoustic", as opposed to "Babyboom".

=== Suicide Bid ===
Laila, Barney and Ben also contribute vocals to the ongoing dub/punk project Suicide Bid and feature heavily on the collective's 2006 album The Rot Stops Here as well as performing live on rare occasions such as Rebellion Festival.

=== Rebel Alliance Recordings ===
Rebel Alliance Recordings was originally the band's outlet for releasing the second SB6 album, Arcade Perfect, in 2006, but has since grown into a small record label, counting The Babylon Whackers, Random Hand, Mouthwash and The Skints among its ranks.

== Members ==
- Paul Barnes (a.k.a. Barney Boom): Bass, Vocals, Guitar
- Laila Khan (a.k.a. Laila K / Lazer K): Vocals, Melodica
- Nick Horne (a.k.a. The Blade): Guitar, Trombone, Trumpet, Back-up Vocals, Melodica, Bass
- Luke Hesketh: Drums

=== Former members ===
- Ben Childs (a.k.a. Ben C): Saxophone, Guitar, Vocals (2002–2009)
- Davey Kelly (a.k.a. Hellfire): Guitar (2002–2005)
- Neil McMinn (a.k.a. Madfish): Drums, Samples (2002–2015)
- Matthew Reynolds: Guitar (temporary member, 2009–2010)
- Lee Hartney: Guitar, Keytar (temporary member, 2011)
- James Routh (a.k.a. Jimmy T Boom): Guitar, Synthesiser, Trombone, Bass, Back-up Vocals (2010–2026)

== Discography ==
=== Albums ===
Year	Title	Label
2006	The Ruff Guide to Genre-Terrorism	Deck Cheese
2009 (Deluxe Edition)	The Ruff Guide to Genre-Terrorism	Rebel Alliance
2007	Arcade Perfect	Rebel Alliance
2009	City of Thieves	Rebel Alliance
2012	Sonic Boom Six	Xtra Mile
2016	The F-Bomb	Cherry Red Records

=== Mini albums ===
Year	Title	Label
2017	Cardiac Address	Rebel Alliance

=== EPs ===
Year	Title	Label
2002	Sonic Boom Six EP	self-released
2003	The Turbo EP	Moon Ska Europe
2004	Sounds to Consume	Moon Ska Europe
2005 (Champion Edition)	Sounds to Consume	Moon Ska Europe
2006	as Babyboom: Babyboom	self-released

=== Singles ===
Year	Title	Album	Label
2007	All-In	The Ruff Guide to Genre-Terrorism	Deck Cheese
2009	The Concrete We're Trapped Within (It's Yours)	City of Thieves	Rebel Alliance
2009	Back 2 Skool	City of Thieves	Rebel Alliance
2011	New Style Rocka	n/a	Rebel Alliance
2011	Sunny Side of the Street	n/a	Rebel Alliance
2011	For the Kids of the Multiculture	Sonic Boom Six	Rebel Alliance
2011	Play On (Split with The Nix 86)	n/a	Asbestos/Underground Communiqué
2012	Virus	Sonic Boom Six	Xtra Mile
2013	Keep on Believing	Sonic Boom Six	Xtra Mile
2013	The High Cost Of Living	Sonic Boom Six	Xtra Mile
2015	No Man, No Right	The F-Bomb	Rebel Alliance
2016	From The Fire To The Frying Pan	The F-Bomb	Rebel Alliance

=== Compilation albums ===
Year	Title	Label
2008	Play On: Rare, Rejected & Arcade Perfected	Rebel Alliance
2010	Rude Awakening	Rebel Alliance
2024	Re:Generation	Rebel Alliance

=== Music videos ===
- The Rape of Punk to Come (2004)
- All-In (2007)
- While You Were Sleeping (2007)
- Sound of a Revolution (2009)
- The Road to Hell is Paved With Good Inventions (2010)
- New Style Rocka (2011)
- What Doesn't Kill You Makes You Stronger (2011)
- Sunny Side of the Street (2011)
- For the Kids of the Multiculture (2011)
- Virus (2012)
- Karma is a Bitch (2013)
- Keep on Believing (2013)
- The High Cost Of Living (2013)
- No Man, No Right (2015)
- From The Fire To The Frying Pan (2016)

=== DVDs ===
Year	Title	Label
2007	Ruff and Ready: Live in Manchester	self-released
2009	Boom or Bust: Live in Manchester	Rebel Alliance

=== Compilation appearances ===
Year	Title	Track(s) Contributed	Label
2003	This Are UK Ska Vol. 3	Northern Skies	Do The Dog
2004	Punktastic Un-Scene	Un Scene	Punktastic/Sorepoint
2004	Punktastic Un-Scene	Boom Bye Bye	Punktastic/Sorepoint
2008	Punktastic Un-Scene Vol. 4	An Ode To DIY Promoters	Punktastic/Banquet
2009	Go Folk Yourself	September To May [Acoustic]	Guerilla Asso
