= Mike Scott (English musician) =

- Mike Scott

Background information
- Also known as: Mike Scott (Phinius Gage)
- Born: England
- Origin: United Kingdom
- Genre: Acoustic punk
- Years active: 2003–present
- Labels: Fond of Life; Aaahh!!! Real Records

Mike Scott is the bassist of Phinius Gage and vocalist from Lay It On The Line. He had released three solo acoustic folk punk albums and writes for long running punk zine Punktastic. He has also been in Brighton Pop Punks River Jumpers and UK82 punks Anti-Establishment.

He actively promotes animal rights and is vegan.

Scott played his first solo show in 2007, after five years as bassist for Phinius Gage. He recorded a split 7-inch with Kevin Seconds of 7 Seconds and has recorded three solo albums.

Since January 2012, Scott has also performed vocals in hardcore punk band Lay it on the Line and this has become his main project. The band are notable for their choice of subjects - releases are concepts based on murders and deaths of the 19th, 20th and 21st centuries - including the murder of Scott's friend Ben Gardner in 2009, which is the subject of the band's song "Therapia Lane". They (and Mike in particular) have regularly chosen the Process Church of the Final Judgement as subject matter in the songs, too, including 2015 EP "A Prelude To The Process".

== Academia ==
In addition to his musical endeavours, Scott is also a published historian; with his piece "The Spartan Legacy in the contemporary Popular Culture; A case study of the 300" being published in the Journal of Ancient Spartan and Greek History.

== Podcast ==
Scott is a regular presenter on the Crystal Palace F.C. supporters' podcast, 'Back Of the Nest'.

== Discography ==
=== Solo ===
Year	Title	Label	Notes
2007	Massacre Songs	Fond of Life	mini-album
2008	At the Slaughterhouse	Punktastic/Fond of Life	EP
2009	Split with Flav Giorgini	Fond of Life	mini-album
2009	Split with Kevin Seconds	Fond of Life	EP
2010	Split with Ben Childs	self released	album
2010	...and a Master of None	Disconnect Disconnect	EP
2011	Saturation Point	Fond of Life	album
2011	(Almost) Everything Else	Aaahh!!! Real	compilation album
2013	Fiesta De Los Muertos	Aaahh!!! Real	album
TBC	Split with Luke Pabich	Fond of Life	EP

=== with Phinius Gage ===
Year	Title	Label	Notes
2003	More Haste, More Speed	Deck Cheese	mini-album
2005	The Feeling Something's Wrong	Deck Cheese	album
2006	Brighton Rock	Fond of Life	compilation album
2007	Seek Out Your Foes, and Make Them Sorry	Fond of Life/Small Town	album

=== with Lay it on the Line ===
Year	Title	Label	Notes
2012	Midnight In The Bellagio	Aaahh!! Real Records	Demo - Tape, Digital
2012	A Lesson In Personal Finance	Aaahh!! Real Records	EP - Tape, Digital
2013	Crowhurst	Fire Engine Red Records	EP - 12-inch Vinyl, Digital
2013	Arizona Split	Fire Engine Red Records	Split EP - 7-inch Vinyl, Digital
2013	Vigilance	Lockjaw Records	EP - Digital
2015	A Prelude To The Process	Aaahh!! Real Records	EP - CD, Digital
2017	The Black Museum	Disconnect Disconnect Records	LP - CD, Digital
