= Ourselves =

Ourselves may refer to:

== Arts and entertainment ==
- Ourselves (album), by 7 Seconds, 1988
- Ourselves (play), by Marianne Chambers, 1805
- "Ourselves", a song by Ayumi Hamasaki from &, 2003

== Grammar ==
- A reflexive pronoun, in English
- An intensive pronoun, in English

== See also ==
- Sinn Féin, an Irish political party
