= 7 Seconds (band) =

American hardcore punk band

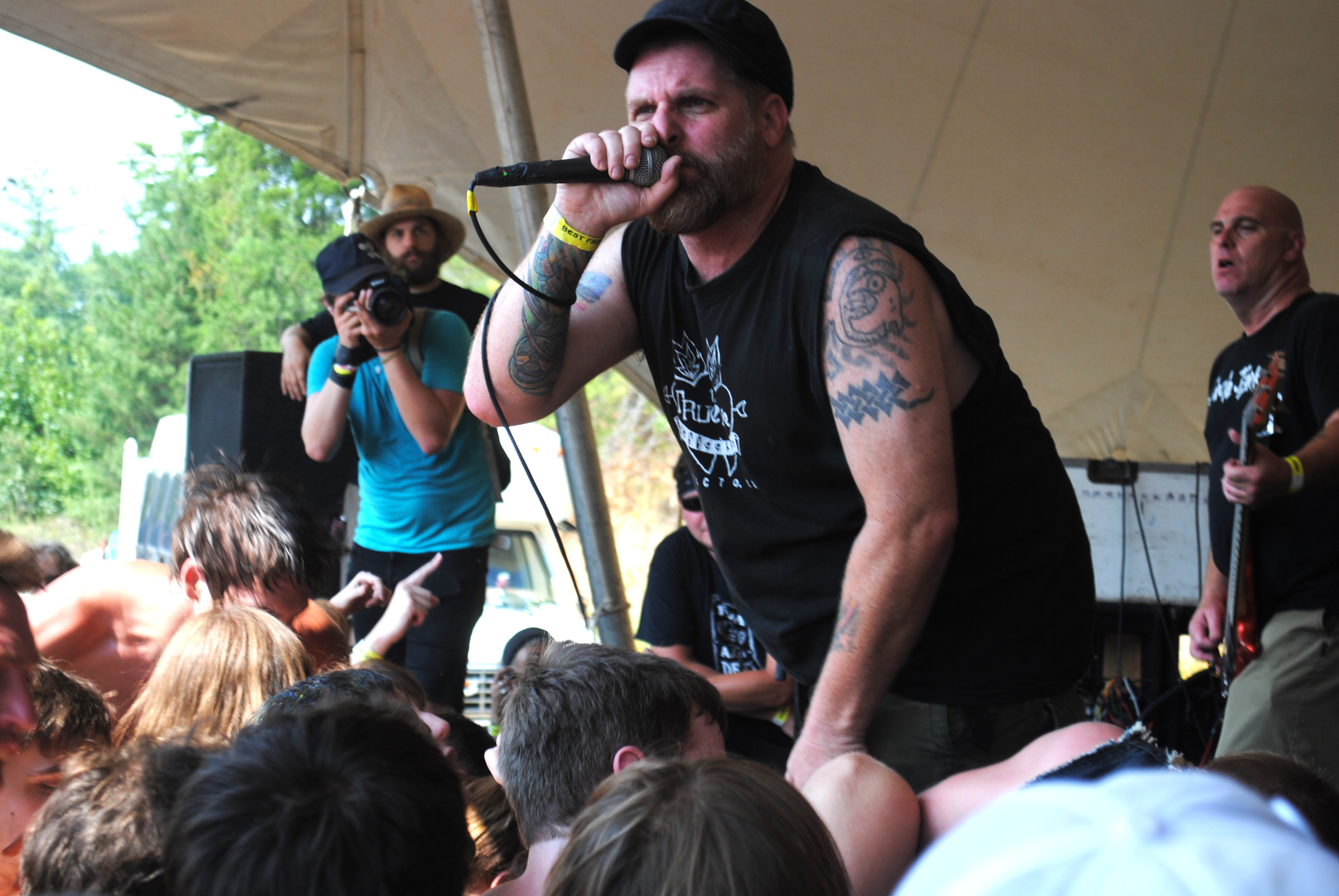
- Live at Hadad's Lake, Best Friends Day RVA in 2011.

Background information
- Origin: Reno, Nevada, U.S.
- Genre: Hardcore punk
- Years active: 1980–present
- Labels: Rise, Alternative Tentacles, SideOneDummy, BYO, Epic
- Members: Kevin Seconds; Steve Youth; Sammy Siegler; Bobby Adams; Bobby Jordan (touring member)
- Past members: Troy Mowat; Tommunist; Dim Menace; Jim Diederichsen; Alan White; Tony Toxic; Dan Pozniak; Ron Doig; K-Tell; Belvyk "Belvy K"Kamillus; Spiz Hughes; Josef Bansuelo; Chris Carnahan

7 Seconds (stylized as 7Seconds) is an American hardcore punk band from Reno, Nevada, that was formed in 1980 by two sets of brothers. The band has gone through numerous lineup changes over the subsequent years, with only Kevin Seconds, Steve Youth and Bobby Adams remaining constant members. The current lineup consists of Kevin Seconds (vocals), Steve Youth (bass), Troy Mowat (drums), and Bobby Adams (guitar).

7 Seconds is regarded as a seminal punk band, and are credited as early innovators in multiple genres and movements within punk.

== History ==
=== Formation ===
7 Seconds was formed on January 17, 1980, by two sets of brothers; the Marvelli brothers, using the punk rock names "Kevin Seconds" and "Steve Youth", and the Borghino brothers, who were known as "Tommunist" and "Dim Menace".

Asked about the origins of the band's name in a December 1982 interview with Flipside magazine, Kevin Seconds recalled:

"...I was ordering The Dils single '198 Seconds of The Dils' from Bomp and I wrote it on a desk and the ink it said 97 Seconds; and then we saw this movie Day of the Jackals or something and all through it there were references to 7 Seconds, and the Dils were like our idols... So we were looking for a name and we were looking at this racing book and it said 7 seconds and we said, 'fuck it, must be an omen,' so we picked it. It's a short, intense name."

=== Recording history ===
The band's early releases were several EPs including 1982's Skins, Brains and Guts, most of which were later re-released on the alt.music.hardcore and Old School compilation CDs. All three demos were released on a bootleg release named 7 Seconds – Hardcore Rules, 80-82. They also appeared on the 1985 hardcore compilation Cleanse the Bacteria, in addition to numerous other compilations, such as Not So Quiet On the Western Front (Alt. Tentacles, 1982), Something to Believe In (BYO, 1984), Party or Go Home/We Got Power (Mystic, 1983), and Nuke Your Dink (Positive Force, 1984). They became closely associated with the Straight Edge movement during this time.

Their first full-length album, The Crew, was recorded in 1983–84 and released by BYO Records, as was its successor – 1985's EP Walk Together, Rock Together, which was expanded the next year into a full-length album with live tracks on the b-side. With the New Wind album, the band dramatically expanded its sound and style with audible elements of a sometimes quieter, slower, more melodic and accessible sound. Though initially criticized by their fanbase, in time it would receive critical acclaim.

Subsequent LPs moved deeper into mainstream territory with a U2-like sound. The 7 Seconds album continued their musical experimentation. The band broke free in 1995 with The Music, The Message, moving back somewhat into their roots. The Music, The Message was released on Sony (BMI), the first release on a major label throughout the band's history. Earlier material was on various homegrown labels, completely self-produced, or put out on Kevin Seconds own label, Positive Force Records (AKA United Front), before BYO Records housed them. However, the band returned to an old-school hardcore sound in 1999 with the Good to Go album. 2005 came the release of Take It Back, Take It On, Take It Over! on SideOneDummy, completing the evolution back to their Hardcore roots.

=== Later history ===
In May 2013 it was announced that 7 Seconds had signed to Rise Records, with plans to record a new 7" and a full-length album that summer in Sacramento.

On March 20, 2018, 7 Seconds announced their breakup via their official Facebook page. In their official statement, they would explain that, "This time around, the reality of being middle-aged, working class, not terribly relevant and not being able to bounce back from injuries and personal problems has become a weight just too great for us to bear and all signs finally point to retirement."

On October 4, 2021, 7 Seconds announced via Facebook a reunion tour in 2022 alongside Circle Jerks (headliner) and Negative Approach (opener). For health reasons, longtime drummer Troy Mowat did not join the band. His replacement for the tour was Sammy Siegler (Youth of Today, Judge). In 2024, the band announced via Facebook that they would perform at the This is Hardcore festival along with Black Flag.

== Style and Legacy ==
7 Seconds is believed to be the first band to refer to themselves primarily as hardcore. After their first show on March 2, 1980, in Newsletter NWIN/SPUNK No. 1 they described their band as hardcore new wave. Vocalist Kevin Seconds has gone on to have a lengthy solo career, becoming an important folk punk singer too, recording with artists including Matt Skiba of Alkaline Trio and Mike Scott of Lay It on the Line.

7 Seconds has also influenced multiple movements in Hardcore, being cited as pioneers of Straight Edge and Youth Crew. They are also considered a seminal influence on Melodic Hardcore and Pop Punk.

Dim Menace's fist-brandishing scowl on the cover of the Skins, Brains, & Guts EP is one of the most iconic images in hardcore. Sacramento News & Review speaks at length of their influence in the positive hardcore movement and their positive effect on the punk culture.

== Members ==
Current members

- Kevin Seconds – vocals, guitar (1980–2018, 2022–present)
- Steve Youth – bass, guitar, piano, backing vocals (1980–1986, 1987–2018, 2022–present)
- Bobby Adams – guitar, backing vocals (1981–1987, 1993–2018, 2022–present)
- Sammy Siegler – drums (2022–present)

Touring members

- Bobby Jordan – guitar, bass (2022–present)

Former members

- Tom Munist (aka Tom Borghino) – drums (1980–1981)
- Dim Menace (aka Dim Borghino) – vocals (1980)
- Tony Toxic – vocals (1981)
- Jim D. – guitar (1981)
- Bix Bigler – drums (1982)
- Troy Mowat – drums, backing vocals (1983–2018)
- Dan Pozniak – guitar, backing vocals (1983–1985)
- Ron Doig – guitar (1986)
- Spizz (aka Jon Hughes) – bass (1986)
- Joseph Bansuelo – bass (1986–1987)
- Chris Carnahan – guitar, backing vocals (1989–1991)
- Belvy Camillus (aka Eric Klein) – drums (1981)
- Jim Diederichsen – guitar, bass (1980–1981, died 2009)
- Alan Wright – guitar, drums (1980–1981)

== Discography ==
=== Demos ===
- Drastic Measures (cassette), 1980
- Socially Fucked Up (cassette), 1981
- Three Chord Politics (cassette), 1981

=== EPs ===
- Skins, Brains and Guts (Alternative Tentacles, 1982)
- Committed for Life (Squirtdown, 1983)
- Blasts from the Past (Positive Force, 1985)
- Walk Together, Rock Together (Positive Force/BYO, 1985)
- Praise (Positive Force Records, 1987)
- 1980 Reissue (Official Bootleg, 1991)
- Happy Rain/Naked (Eating Blur, 1993)
- Split with Kill Your Idols (SideOneDummy, 2004)
- My Aim Is You/Slogan On A Shirt (Rise, 2013)

=== Studio albums ===
- United We Stand (unreleased and later re-issued as Old School - Headhunter Records/Cargo Records, 1983)
- The Crew (BYO, 1984)
- New Wind (Positive Force/BYO, 1986)
- Ourselves (Restless, 1988)
- Soulforce Revolution (Restless, 1989); No. 153 on the 1989 Billboard 200
- Out the Shizzy (Headhunter/Cargo, 1993)
- The Music, the Message (Sony/BMI, 1995)
- Good to Go (SideOneDummy, 1999)
- Take It Back, Take It On, Take It Over! (SideOneDummy, 2005)
- Leave a Light On (Rise, 2014)

=== Compilation albums ===
- Walk Together, Rock Together (Positive Force/BYO, 1986)
- alt.music.hardcore (Headhunter/Cargo, 1995)

=== Live albums ===
- Live! One Plus One (Positive Force/Giant, 1987)
- Scream Real Loud...Live! (SideOneDummy, 2000)
- Live at Cindy's 1980 (Eyebar Records, 2022)

=== Compilation appearances ===
- Not So Quiet on the Western Front (MRR/Alternative Tentacles, 1982)
- We Got Power: Party or Go Home (Mystic, 1983)
- Something to Believe In (BYO, 1984)
- Nuke Your Dink (Positive Force, 1984)
- Cleanse the Bacteria (Pusmort, 1985)
- Another Shot for Bracken (Positive Force, 1986)
- Four Bands That Could Change the World (Gasatanka, 1987)
- Flipside Vinyl Fanzine, vol. 3 (Flipside, 1987)
- Human Polity (One World Communications, 1993)
- The Song Retains the Name, vol. 2 (Safe House, 1993)
- Ten Years Later (Bossa Nova, 1997)
- Short Music for Short People (Fat Wreck Chords, 1999)
- Let Them Know: The Story of Youth Brigade and BYO Records (BYO, 2009)
- Old School Punk Vol.1 (Walk Together, Rock Together)
