= Pedigree Chump =

Studio album by Spunge
- Released: 1 March 1999
- Recorded: Merlin Cave Studios, Malvern, England. December 1998 - January 1999
- Genre: Ska punk
- Length: 34:02 (w/o bonus tracks)
- Label: Moon Ska Europe
- Producer: Spunge

Spunge chronology
The Kicking Pigeons EP (1998)	Pedigree Chump (1999)	Room for Abuse (2000)

Pedigree Chump is the first album from the British ska punk band Spunge. It was released following the success of The Kicking Pigeons EP a year earlier which sold 5,000 copies to early followers at pub gigs.

The first 3,000 copies of the album included a five track bonus CD of live recordings. The standard album was re-released in December 2000 as a limited edition digipak without the bonus tracks. In 2004, the album was again re-released as a limited edition in a slipcase. The bonus tracks were bundled back onto this version, plus a rare demo of "Make Me Happy" and an enhanced video of "Kicking Pigeons".

No singles were released from Pedigree Chump. However, the song "Kicking Pigeons" can be found on The Kicking Pigeons EP and an updated version of the same song is the second A-side on "Live Another Day/Kicking Pigeons 2001", a single from their next album Room For Abuse.

== Track listing (album) ==
1. "Intro" – 0:06
2. "Lyrical Content" – 3:05
3. "Idols" – 2:08
4. "Kicking Pigeons" – 2:41
5. "Roving Eye" – 2:48
6. "Angel With a Pint Glass" – 4:08
7. "Make Me Happy" – 2:42
8. "Ode 2 Slimy Bassless" – 2:41
9. "Have Another Go" – 0:04
10. "Whitehouse" – 2:25
11. "Kiss My Face" – 2:59
12. "Sleazoid" – 1:58
13. "Freak" – 2:50
14. "Whinger" – 3:21

"Intro" and "Have Another Go" are short comedic tracks consisting mainly of people talking in strange accents. Also, at the end of "Whinger" there is a hidden comedy track about custard. It is speculated that the track "Ode 2 Slimy Bassless" is about former Spunge bass guitarist Simon Bayliss.

== Track listing (bonus tracks) ==
1. "500 Miles" (live)
2. "Roving Eye" (live at Xposure, Birmingham)
3. "Freak" (live at Xposure, Birmingham)
4. "Pressure Drop" (live)
5. "Alternative Ulster" (live)
6. "Make Me Happy" (demo) (only on 2004 reissue)
7. "Kicking Pigeons" (video) (only on 2004 reissue)
