= Jump on Demand =

Single by Spunge

from the album The Story So Far
- Released: June 3, 2002
- Recorded: ???
- Genre: Ska punk
- Length: CD 2 - 9:15
- Label: B-Unique, Warners
- Songwriter(s): Alex Copeland, Damon Robins, Chris Murphy, Jeremy King, Paul Gurney
- Producer(s): ???

Spunge singles chronology
"Live Another Day/Kicking Pigeons 2001" (2001)	"Jump on Demand" (2002)	"Roots" (2002)

"Jump On Demand" is a single released by the Tewkesbury ska punk band Spunge on June 3, 2002. The single was released as a 7" vinyl and two CD versions. The first CD contains the music video for "Jump on Demand". It peaked at number 39 on the UK Singles Chart.

== Track listings ==
7" Vinyl

1. "Jump on Demand"
2. "All She Ever Wants"

CD 1

1. "Jump on Demand"
2. "Go Away"

CD 2

1. "Jump on Demand" - 3:22
2. "Whitehouse" - 2:24
3. "Best Mates Girlfriend" - 3:28
