= Turbo (EP) =

The Turbo EP

EP by Sonic Boom Six
- Released: September 2003
- Genre: Punk
- Length: unknown
- Label: Moon Ska Europe
- Producer: Ace, Christophe Bride

Sonic Boom Six chronology
Sonic Boom Six EP	The Turbo EP	Sounds to Consume

The Turbo EP is an EP released by Manchester band Sonic Boom Six in September 2003. The EP was their first release for Moon Ska Europe; they had self-released an EP the previous year. This was produced by Ace (of Skunk Anansie) and Christophe.

According to Barney Boom, it was limited to 1000 copies.

== Track listing ==
1. Blood For Oil
2. People Acklike They Don't Know
3. The Devil Made Me Do It
4. Silent Majority
