= The Ruff Guide to Genre-Terrorism =

Studio album by Sonic Boom Six
- Released: July 2006
- Genre: Punk rock, Ska-punk, Rapcore, Reggae
- Length: 50:19
- Label: Deck Cheese (2006 UK release); Asbestos Records (US); Rebel Alliance (2009 UK re-release)
- Producer: Ace, TiM G

Sonic Boom Six chronology
Sounds to Consume	The Ruff Guide to Genre-Terrorism (2006)	Arcade Perfect (2007)

The Ruff Guide to Genre-Terrorism is the first full-length release by Manchester, UK based Sonic Boom Six. This album marks the first recording by SB6 since the departure of original guitarist Dave "Hellfire" Kelly.

== Track listing ==
1. Do It Today - 4:31
2. Apathy Begins At Home - 3:42
3. All-In (feat. Coolie Ranx) - 4:32
4. Piggy In The Middle - 4:03
5. For Unlawful Carnal Knowledge - 3:59
6. Northern Skies - 3:39
7. Bigger Than Punk Rock - 3:30
8. Danger! Danger! - 3:23
9. Don't Say I Never Warned Ya - 3:47
10. Shareena - 4:27
11. A People's History Of The Future - 3:45
12. Until The Sunlight Comes - 7:06

=== 2008 US CD version ===
13. Found it, Burnt it, Fucked Off
14. All-In [Tim G Remix]

=== 2009 UK CD version ===
13. Piggy In The Middle [Demo]
14. Shareena [Demo]
15. All-In [Tim G Remix]
16. Northern Skies [Babyboom Remix]

== Notes ==
This CD was the band's first release on Deck Cheese, with their previous CDs having been on Moon Ska Europe. A demo of A People's History Of The Future was posted on the band's MySpace profile in 2005, although the song was very different at the time and was called The World's A Twisted Place (But It Won't Twist Me). All-In features guest vocals from Coolie Ranx.
