= That Should Cover It! =

Studio album by Spunge
- Released: February 23, 2004
- Genre: Ska punk
- Length: 31:43
- Label: Dent'All Records

Spunge chronology
The Story So Far (2002)	That Should Cover It! (2004)	Room for Abuse 2006 (2006)

That Should Cover It! is a covers album by the Tewkesbury ska punk band Spunge. It also contains three re-recorded songs from earlier in the band's career and two completely new songs. It was released on February 23, 2004, on the band's own label Dent'All Records.

The CD-ROM also contains the music video for the song "Centerfold" (made with the help of Goblin Pictures). The video is made up shots of the band playing live, interspersed with shots of the band doing random things elsewhere.

== Track listing ==
1. "Centerfold" (The J. Geils Band) – 2:59
2. "Circle in the Sand" (Belinda Carlisle) – 2:51
3. "Oliver's Army" (Elvis Costello) – 2:50
4. "Land Down Under" (Men at Work) – 3:29
5. "I'm Gonna Be (500 Miles)" (The Proclaimers) – 3:18
6. "Happy Hour" (The Housemartins) – 2:34
7. "Whitehouse" – 2:36
8. "Get Along" – 2:39
9. "Skanking Song" – 2:28
10. "Some Suck, Some Rock" – 3:10
11. "Don't Ruin My Day" – 2:43
