= Take It Back, Take It On, Take It Over! =

Studio album by 7 Seconds
- Released: 2005
- Genre: Hardcore punk
- Length: 28:11
- Label: Side One Dummy
- Producer: Bill Stevenson

7 Seconds chronology
Scream Real Loud...Live! (2000)	Take It Back, Take It On, Take It Over! (2005)	Leave a Light On (2014)

Professional ratings
Review scores
Source	Rating
Punknews.org	4.5/5 stars

Take It Back, Take It On, Take It Over! is an album by the punk rock band 7 Seconds, released in 2005.

== Release ==
It was promoted with a US tour, titled Our Core, in February and March 2005; they were supported on various parts of it by Groovie Ghoulies, the Briggs, Champion and Kill Your Idols. In August 2006, the band performed at Death or Glory Fest; two months later, they appeared at Riot Fest.

== Critical reception ==
AllMusic called the album a "melodic thrash-fest [that] proves the band is vital as ever." Punknews.org wrote that the album is "literally three-chord choruses, battering drums and of course Kevin Seconds' genuine, glorious, high-pitched vocals supported by the wow-ing backings."

== Track listing ==
All songs written by Kevin Seconds, except for where noted.

1. "All Came Undone" - 0:58
2. "Meant to Be My Own" - 1:50
3. "This Is Temporary" - 1:17
4. "My Band, Our Crew" - 2:05
5. "Still on It" - 2:48
6. "Say My Thanks" - 1:15
7. "Big Fall" - 1:11
8. "Stand Here and Just Stare" - 1:23
9. "Where Is the Danger?" - 1:47
10. "Big Hardcore Mystery" - 2:22
11. "Panic Attack" - 1:43
12. "Our Core" - 1:14
13. "Breaking News" - 1:34
14. "One Friend Too Many" - 1:37
15. "Y.P.H." (Seconds, Bob Adams, Steve Youth, Troy Mowat) - 2:31
16. "Your Frustration" - 1:15
17. "Rules to Follow" - 1:25

== Personnel ==
- Kevin Seconds – lead vocals
- Bob Adams – guitar, vocals
- Troy Mowat – drums
- Steve Youth – bass, piano
