= Sounds to Consume =

Studio album by Sonic Boom Six
- Released: August 2005 (Champion Edition); August 2004 (original release)
- Genre: Punk
- Length: 30:07 (Original Version) 65:07 (Champion Edition)
- Label: Moon Ska Europe
- Producer: Ace

Sonic Boom Six chronology
The Turbo EP	Sounds to Consume	The Ruff Guide to Genre-Terrorism

Sounds to Consume is Sonic Boom Six's second release for Moon Ska Europe and comprises four new tracks alongside the four tracks from their original release, The Turbo EP. It has since been reissued twice, firstly as the 'Champion Edition' which comprised the original 8 tracks and 8 bonus tracks, and the subsequent reissue of the Champion Edition which was remastered as well as featuring a further 2 bonus tracks. Both Champion Editions are housed in digipack packaging and contain a different booklet to the original release.

The original edition, as well as the first pressing of the Champion Edition, were limited to 1,000 copies each.

== Track listing ==
No.	Title	Length
1.	"The Rape Of Punk To Come"	4:13
2.	"Let The Children Play"	4:53
3.	"Monkey See, Monkey Do (Funky Kingston)"	3:39
4.	"Safe European Home"	4:06
5.	"Blood For Oil"	3:09
6.	"People Acklike They Don't Know"	3:06
7.	"The Devil Made Me Do It"	3:51
8.	"Silent Majority"	3:12

Champion Edition Bonus Tracks
No.	Title	Length
9.	"SB6 [Demo]"	3:54
10.	"Northern Skies [Demo]"	3:32
11.	"Different People [Demo]"	1:28
12.	"Play Inna Day [Demo]"	3:15
13.	"Rape Of Punk To Come [Tim G Mash-Up Refix]"	2:58
14.	"Monkey See, Monkey Do [Rogue Trooper's Jungle Fever]"	4:13
15.	"Northern Dub [Casa Boom Reggae Refit]"	5:58
16.	"The Reckoning"	3:17
17.	"Monkey See, Monkey Do [Live]"	3:37
18.	"The Mighty, Mighty Boom"	2:52

All versions contain enhanced CD-ROM videos.

The first track, "The Rape of Punk to Come", is a title parody of Refused's album The Shape of Punk to Come.
