= City of Thieves =

City of Thieves may refer to:

- City of Thieves (gamebook), a 1983 single-player adventure gamebook in the Fighting Fantasy series written by Ian Livingstone
- City of Thieves (album), a 2009 album by Sonic Boom Six
- City of Thieves (novel), a 2008 historical fiction novel by David Benioff
- "City of Thieves", episode 13 of the first season of Adventure Time
