= Inhale/Exhale =

Inhale/Exhale may refer to:

- Inhale/Exhale (Nasum album)
- Inhale/Exhale (Random Hand album)
- Inhale / Exhale (Rüfüs Du Sol album)

== See also ==
- Inhale Exhale, a Christian metalcore band
