= Go Jimmy Go =

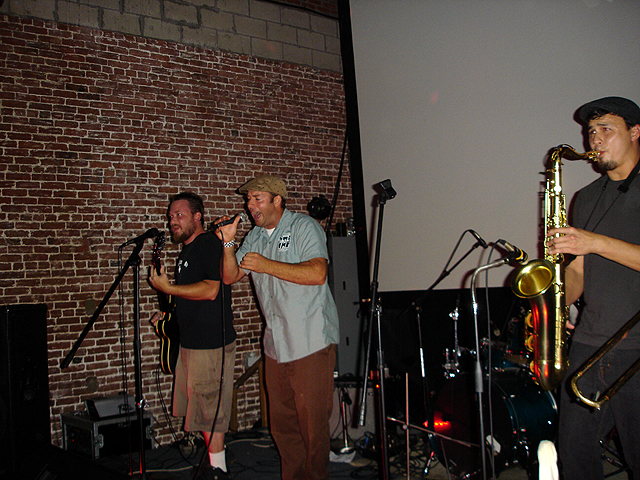
- Go Jimmy Go performing in Honolulu in 2008

Background information
- Origin: Honolulu, Hawaii, United States
- Genres: Ska; Rocksteady; Reggae; Soul
- Occupations: Recording Artists and Touring Band
- Years active: 1996-2016
- Labels: Jump Up!, Moon Room, Moon Ska World, Ska In the World, Rivercidal Syndicate Records, Go Jimmy Go
- Past members: Jason "Bison" Friedmann; Andrew McClellan; Ian Ashley; Shon Gregory; Eric White; Brandon Hutson; Cameron Wright; Fernando Pacheco; Larry Gordon; Tino Olsen; Andrew McClellan; Lindy Patterson; Tyson Balmores; Jayder Kalk; Ryan Kunimura
- Website: http://www.gojimmygo.com/

Go Jimmy Go was an American ska, rocksteady, reggae and soul influenced band from Honolulu, Hawaii. Although chronologically, the band belongs to the third-wave, their mellow, slower tempo sound is reminiscent of the classic style of the original 1960s Jamaican first wave of ska.

== History ==
Go Jimmy Go was formed in 1996 during the height of the third-wave ska craze by Larry Gordon and Cameron Wright during the weekly Ska Night at a club then known as The Vibe at the renowned Puck's Alley near the University of Hawaiʻi. Several of the regulars of Ska Night had discussed forming a band which would be Hawaii's answer to the thriving "traditional ska" scene. After several false starts and frequent jam sessions featuring a rotating cast of trial members, a small core emerged consisting of Wright on bass guitar, Gordon on alto saxophone and vocals, Eric White on tenor saxophone, Ian Ashley on guitar and Tyson Balmores on drums, with several musicians rotating in and out of the lineup to fill in at various positions. "We had so many members come and go that first year. We were picky from the start," remembered White. "By the second year, we must have had about 20 total members pass through." These included a trio of female back-up singers, an organist and a trumpeter.

From the beginning it was decided by the band that Go Jimmy Go's sound would be more influenced by early ska and rocksteady pioneers such as The Maytals, The Wailers, The Skatalites, Alton Ellis, Ken Boothe and more recently L.A.'s Hepcat. Eventually soul music, rocksteady, reggae, funk and even Hawaiian began to blend seamlessly with the band's sound, reflecting the many musical influences of the core members. The band decided that a focus on original music as opposed to covers would set them apart from many of the traditional ska groups currently performing on the scene. "Egyptian Ska", "Mafioso", and "Jericho" were early favorites that were staple tunes in GJG's early set.

In 1997, a turning point came when Go Jimmy Go was introduced to Santa Barbara roots reggae favorites Dynamic Pressure, who had recently relocated to the islands. However, the stress of maintaining the band, playing shows and living in a new state were too much and Dynamic Pressure unfortunately disbanded. The premature demise of the group led to former lead singer Jason "Bison" Friedmann being offered a spot in Go Jimmy Go.

During a show at the Karaoke Ninja House in Honolulu, guitarist Tino Olsen was invited to join the band. Olsen's role in song writing and vocals led to many of the band's songs including a three part harmony.

1998 was an important year for Go Jimmy Go as several high-profile gigs, including the Spring Skalabration, which featured Go Jimmy Go along with ska superstars Hepcat, Save Ferris, and Dance Hall Crashers helped cement the band as Hawaii's premier ska act. Several compilation CDs were released nationally on Stubborn Records and Steadybeat featuring Go Jimmy Go, which helped expose the band to a much wider audience. 1998 also saw the departure of Gordon from the group, as well early studio sessions which helped expose the band to a studio setting, helping pave the way for the group's debut CD "Slow Time".

Much of 1999 was spent in studio working on "Slow Time" as trombonist Fernando Pacheco joined the group.

2000: Full-length debut album "Slow Time" released independently to coincide with their first-ever tour. "Slow Time CD Release and Tour Sendoff Party" at Hawaiian Hut—sold out (1,000+ attendees)! Go Jimmy Go and Deal's Gone Bad teamed up for a West Coast US tour which culminated in their final show at the Whisky a Go Go in Hollywood.

2001: Former Red Session drummer Shon Gregory joined the band. Re-released edition of "Slow Time" via Jump Up! Records in Chicago, Illinois. 5th Anniversary Party at Hawaiian Hut—sold out (1,000+ attendees). "Soul Arrival" EP released. 2nd West Coast Tour.

2002: 2nd full-length album, "Soul Arrival," released on Moon Room Records. "Soul Arrival" CD Release Party at Hawaiian Hut—sold out (1,000+ attendees). Played the Western half (17 dates) of the Van's Warped Tour 2002. Main support for No Doubt "Rocksteady Tour" at sold out Blaisdell Arena (8,000 attendees).

2003: "Ska Summit 2003" Tour.

2004: Go Jimmy Go become full-time musicians and start touring the US coast to coast. "Slow Time" re-released on Moon Room Records with unreleased tracks and re-mastered by Chris Murray. Three US tours.

2005: Go Jimmy Go - Releases "Bang The Skillet" & "Super Sonic", on Rivercidal Syndicate Record's "Primosonic Rhythms Vol. 2" V/A Compilation "Islands Sounds" GJG compilation CD released in Japan under Disk Union/Ska in the World Records. 1st Japan Tour. Go Jimmy Go's third full-length studio album "The Girl With The Fishbowl Eyes" released on Moon Room Records. "The Girl with the...Fishbowl Eyes" Summer Tour. Van's Warped Tour 2005 Midwest dates. Co-headlined Ska Is Dead 3 Tour w/ The Toasters and Mustard Plug.

2006: Celebrates 10th Anniversary with a sold-out show at Hawaiian Hut (1,000+ attendees). "Set Me Free" music video is recorded and released. Ska Brawl US Tour co-headline with The Toasters. Pressure Points US Tour supporting John Brown's Body.

2007: Ska Brawl Europe Tour co-headlining with The Toasters—39 straight shows, 13 countries. Moon Ska World release " The Girl With The Fishbowl Eyes " in the United Kingdom. "Holiday Hell Yeah!" released on Moon Room Records as Go Jimmy Go's 4th full-length album. "Holiday Hell Yeah!" released in Japan under the Disk Union/Ska in the World Record label.

2008: Kokua Festival 2008 w/ Jack Johnson, Dave Matthews—2 nights, sold out at the Waikiki Shell. Hawaiian Punch Europe Tour—headlining tour in support of Euro compilation debut of "Essentials" from Scorcha Records.

2009: Hawaiian Punch Asia Tour in Japan, China and Hong Kong. Go Jimmy Go's self-titled and 5th full-length album released on Go Jimmy Go Music (US) and Disk Union/Ska in the World Records (Japan). "Head Up High" music video recording while touring Japan and released. Space 5-0 Tour co-headlining with The Phenomenauts on the West Coast US—the last tour.

2011: 15th Anniversary show.

2016: Go Jimmy Go celebrated its 20th anniversary and farewell show with a live retrospective of the band's studio catalog featuring members past and present on stage together for a final performance at The Republik in Honolulu. This final performance is the basis of a Fall 2019 feature-length documentary covering the history of Go Jimmy Go, the Hawaii underground music scene, and the emergence of ska in the '90s.

2023: Band member Larry Gordon died at age 48 on July 1, 2023.

== Band members ==
- Jason "Bison" Friedmann (Lead Vocals) [1998 to 2016]
- Andrew McClellan (Lead Guitar, Bass) [2002-2005, 2010 to 2016]
- Ian Ashley (Rhythm Guitar, Vocals) [founding member, 1996 to 2016]
- Shon Gregory (Drums, Backup Vocals) [1999 to 2016]
- Eric White (Tenor Saxophone) [founding member, 1996 to 2016]
- Brandon Hutson (Trombone/Keys) [2009 to 2016]
- Tyson Balmores (Drums, Founding Member) [1996-1998, 1999-2000]
- Cameron Wright (Bass, Founding Member) [1996-2007]
- Larry Gordon (Alto Saxophone, Vocals, Founding Member) [1996-1998]
- Tino Olsen (Lead and Rhythm Guitar, Vocals) [1997-2002]
- Jolene Kim (Lead Vocals) [1997-1998]
- Amos Zollo (Drums) [1998-1999]
- Lindy Patterson (Percussion) [1997-1999]
- Fernando Pacheco (Trombone) [1999-2007]
- Jayder Kalk (Bass, Vocals) [2007-2010]
- Ryan Kunimura (Trombone) [2007-2009]
- Mike Best (Trumpet, Vocals) [1996-1997]

== Discography ==
=== Studio albums ===
- Slow Time (Go Jimmy Go Music - 2000, Jump Up! Records - 2001, MoonRoom Records - 2004)
- Soul Arrival (Moon Room Records - 2002)
- The Girl With the...Fishbowl Eyes (Moon Room Records - 2005)
- Holiday Hell Yeah! (Moon Room Records - 2007)
- Go Jimmy Go (Go Jimmy Go Music - 2009)

=== International releases ===
- Islands Sounds (Ska in the World Records - 2005)
- Primosonic Rhythms Vol. 2 (Rivercidal Syndicate Records - 2005)
- The Girl With the...Fishbowl Eyes (Moon Ska World Records - 2007)
- Holiday Hell Yeah! (Ska in the World Records - 2007)
- Essentials (Scorcha Records - 2008)
- Go Jimmy Go (Ska in the World Records - 2008)

=== Cassette ===
- Live on KTUH (Pressure House Music 1997)

=== Live albums ===
- Frequency 90.3 FM (Hawaiian Express Records - 1999)
- Live on the Ska Parade (Pressure House Music - 2001)
- A Hui Hou: 20th Anniversary & Farewell Show (Go Jimmy Go LLC- 2016)

=== EP ===
- Songs From The Upcoming Album: Soul Arrival (Pressure House Music - 2001)

=== DVDs ===
- Camp Ska (Enjoy Yourself Records - 2003)
- Bluebeat Lounge Goes OC (Sluggo Productions - 2005)
