= Got the Thirst =

Studio album by King Prawn
- Released: 3 June 2003
- Recorded: October 2001
- Studio: Fortress II, London, England
- Genre: Ska punk
- Length: 43:18
- Label: Golf Records

King Prawn chronology
Surrender to the Blender (2000)	Got the Thirst (2003)	The Fabulous New Sounds of... (2019)

Professional ratings
Review scores
Source	Rating
AllMusic	4/5 stars
Drowned in Sound	8/10
Visions	8/12
Ox-Fanzine (2016)	4/5 stars
Ox-Fanzine (2003)	
Punknews.org	2.5/5 stars

Got the Thirst is the fourth album by London ska punk band King Prawn. It was recorded in October 2001 at Fortress II in London, England and released on 3 June 2003.

== Track listing ==
1. "Bring Down the House"
2. "The Dominant View"
3. "Caught Inna Rut"
4. "Smoke Some Shit"
5. "The Loneliest Life"
6. "Hell Below"
7. "Bitter Taste"
8. "Raise the Banner"
9. "Lick of the Flame"
10. "Gather Round"
11. "Satan's Folly"
12. "Another Great Escape"
13. "Viva Devi"
14. "If Dawn Comes...We Ride"
