= The Crew (album) =

Studio album by 7 Seconds
- Released: 1984
- Recorded: December 1983, June 1985 (live tracks)
- Venue: Fender's Ballroom (bonus live tracks)
- Studio: Perspective
- Genre: Hardcore punk
- Length: 29:51
- Language: English
- Label: BYO

7 Seconds chronology
The Crew (1984)	Walk Together, Rock Together (1985)

The Crew is the debut studio album by American hardcore punk band 7 Seconds, released in 1984 by BYO Records. The original LP was released with 18 tracks, and later re-released on compact disc with six live bonus tracks.

== Critical reception ==
Professional ratings
Review scores
Source	Rating
AllMusic	4/5 stars
The Encyclopedia of Popular Music	2/5 stars

In retrospective reviews, The Austin Chronicle called the album a "stone classic," writing that "precious few third wave punk-hardcore outfits have aged as stoically – or as relevantly – as vox/guitar sibling duo Kevin Seconds and Steve Youth." Tiny Mix Tapes wrote that the band's sound "is distilled ... to a steady grind of too-pah beats and blender-like three-chord sounds, but it’s the combination of this minimalism and Kevin Seconds’s voice — passionate, melodic, hopeful — that makes you believe everything he says." LA Weekly placed The Crew at No. 3 on its list of the top twenty hardcore albums in history, writing that "7 Seconds wrote the book on positive hardcore and that book is called The Crew."

== Track listing ==
All tracks are written by Kevin Seconds, except where noted.

No.	Title	Writer(s)	Length
1.	"Here's Your Warning"		1:18
2.	"Definite Choice"		0:55
3.	"Not Just Boys Fun"	Seconds, Steve Youth	1:29
4.	"This Is the Angry, Pt. 2"		1:09
5.	"Straight On"		0:24
6.	"You Lose"		0:36
7.	"What If There's War in America"		0:42
8.	"The Crew"		0:51
9.	"Clenched Fists, Black Eyes"		1:30
10.	"Colorblind"		1:42
11.	"Aim to Please"		1:14
12.	"Boss"	Seconds, Youth	0:45
13.	"Young 'Til I Die"		2:01
14.	"Red and Black"		0:37
15.	"Die Hard"		0:57
16.	"I Have a Dream"		1:00
17.	"Bully"		1:05
18.	"Trust"		2:13
19.	"Here's Your Warning" (Live)		1:35
20.	"Spread" (Live)		1:21
21.	"I Have a Dream" (Live)		0:58
22.	"Young 'Til I Die" (Live)		1:51
23.	"Not Just Boys Fun" (Live)	Seconds, Youth	1:26
24.	"Rock Together" (Live)		2:12
Total length:			29:51

== Personnel ==
- Kevin Seconds – lead vocals
- Dan Pozniak – guitar, backing vocals
- Steve Youth – bass, piano
- Troy Mowat – drums
