= Ruff and Ready: Live in Manchester =

Video by Sonic Boom Six
- Released: April 2007
- Recorded: February 2007
- Genre: Punk
- Label: Self-Released

Sonic Boom Six chronology
Ruff and Ready: Live in Manchester	Boom or Bust: Live in Manchester

Ruff and Ready: Live in Manchester is the first DVD by Sonic Boom Six. It was filmed live on 19 February 2007 at the Manchester, England leg of the Ruff and Ready tour.

== Track listing ==
1. Do It Today
2. Blood For Oil
3. Bigger than Punk Rock
4. Monkey See Monkey Do
5. Piggy in the Middle
6. A People’s History of the Future
7. Northern Skies
8. Marching Round in Circles
9. All-In
10. Wind ya Batty
11. Danger! Danger!
12. The Rape of Punk to Come
13. The Mighty Mighty Boom (encore)

== Notes ==
The DVD also includes a picture gallery (accompanied by an acoustic version of Northern Skies), and the promotional video for "All-In".
