= Good to Go (7 Seconds album) =

Studio album by 7 Seconds
- Released: June 22, 1999
- Genre: Hardcore punk
- Length: 26:55
- Label: SideOneDummy

7 Seconds chronology
alt.music.hardcore (1995)	Good to Go (1999)	Scream Real Loud...Live! (2000)

Good to Go is an album by the American hardcore punk band 7 Seconds, released in 1999. It was their first release on SideOneDummy Records.

== Critical reception ==
Professional ratings
Review scores
Source	Rating
AllMusic	4/5 stars
The Encyclopedia of Popular Music	3/5 stars
Rock Hard	9.5/10

AllMusic's Steve Huey wrote that "Good to Go isn't a revolutionary hardcore punk record, just one that's extremely well done." The Sacramento Bee thought that the album "harkens back to classic hard-core punk," writing that "'Sooner or Later', the album's opening track, features an anthemlike chorus and pogo-inspiring energy."

== Album Tracks ==
All songs written by Kevin Seconds, except for where noted.

1. "Sooner or Later" – 1:09
2. "Sour Grapes" – 1:19
3. "One Big Guessing Game" (Seconds, Steve Youth) – 1:51
4. "Best Friend" – 2:00
5. "Slow Down a Second" – 2:05
6. "Safety Net" – 1:22
7. "Change the Key" – 1:57
8. "4, 1, 4, 1, Done" – 0:28
9. "Message from a Friend" (Seconds, Youth) – 1:19
10. "True Roots Show" – 2:03
11. "This World of Mine" – 1:42
12. "You See the Flaws" – 2:04
13. "I See You Found Another Trophy" (Bob Adams, Seconds) – 1:46
14. "Good to Go" – 1:02
15. "Never Try" – 1:46
16. "Here We Go Again Kids" – 2:55

== Personnel ==
- Kevin Seconds: Lead Vocals
- Bob Adams: Guitar, Vocals
- Troy Mowat: Drums
- Steve Youth: Bass, Piano
