= Skaville UK =

- Genres: Ska
- Years active: 2006–
- Labels: Moon Ska World
- Website: http://www.artists2events.co.uk/artists/Skaville UK.html

Skaville UK were a British ska band. Bassist and vocalist Nick Welsh had previously played with a number of bands including Bad Manners, The Selecter and Prince Buster, whilst Louis Alphonso (vocals/guitar) and Martin Stewart (keyboards) also played with Bad Manners. Drummer Al Fletcher also played with The Selecter, Die So Fluid and Lee "Scratch" Perry. He died in 2016. The band regularly played with noted ska singer Rhoda Dakar on guest vocals and she also sang on the Decadent album.

== Albums ==
The band released two full-length albums.

- 1973 (2007)
- Decadent (2008)
