= Random Hand =

Punk band from Keighley

- Origin: Keighley, West Yorkshire, England
- Genres: Punk rock; ska punk; hardcore punk; heavy metal
- Years active: 2002–present
- Labels: Bomber Music Riot Music; Rebel Alliance
- Members: Robin "Russell" Leitch; Joe Tilston; Dan Walsh; Sean Howe
- Past members: Joe Dimuantes; Matthew Crosher

Random Hand is a British punk band, formed in Keighley in 2002. Their sound combines a variety of genres, including ska, reggae, punk rock, metal, hip hop and dub. The band is typically associated with the punk subculture, due to their ethics and sociopolitical lyrical content.

== Biography ==
=== Early career ===
Formed in late 2002, the band's original lineup consisted of Joe Tilston (bass and vocals), Robin Leitch (vocals and trombone), Matt Crosher (guitar and vocals), and Joe Dimuantes (percussion and samples). Random Hand played their first show on 31 December 2002 in a friend's basement in Haworth, with other shows around West Yorkshire, namely in Huddersfield, Leeds and Halifax.

In the summer of 2003, the band recorded a demo, which was given as a free release for download. In late 2004, the band spent time with producer TimG to record the On The March EP. The band set off on their first tour in January 2004 with Catch-it Kebabs and Zen Baseball Bat. This tour was soon followed by a self-booked UK tour in March to coincide with the release of their debut EP, On The March. The band then performed at events like Morcambe's Wasted Festival and shows with The Planet Smashers, Adequate Seven, Sonic Boom Six, Bad Manners, The Beat, Skindred, and Babar Luck. The latter teamed up with the band in the studio to record two tracks.

=== Change of Plan ===
The band began to be represented by Hidden Talent Booking in 2006. This saw Random Hand playing shows on Adequate Seven's final tour, Lightyear's reunion tour and the Three Way Dance with Sonic Boom Six, Failsafe and Crazy Arm, before heading to the studio to record their debut album Change of Plan. The record was released on Riot Music on 7 May 2007.

Following the release, the band toured with Voodoo Glow Skulls, Grown at Home, The JB Conspiracy and Left Alone, and played at the festivals City Invasion, Rebellion and Leeds Festival. Songs from the album received regular play on the Mike Davies Show and were played on the Steve Lamacq Show, and the band recorded a session at Maida Vale Studios for the BBC Radio 1 Punk Show in late 2007. Their songs also appeared on several cover CDs for Big Cheese Magazine. In September 2007 Random Hand signed to independent music publisher Bomber Music also they use them to this day and for their newest album.

In 2008, the band went on their first headline tour of the UK, with 20 dates across the UK. The band then joined Voodoo Glow Skulls on their 2008 west coast United States tour. 2008 also saw performances at several festivals in the UK, in April at City Invasion in Bolton and London, and at the end of May as part of their tour with Sonic Boom Six and Big D and the Kids Table, and at Dunk Fest, Strummercamp and in August at Rebellion. The band appeared at the 2008 Reading and Leeds Festival on the Lock-Up stage.

=== Inhale/Exhale ===
In early September 2008, Random Hand announced the upcoming January 2009 release of their second album, Inhale/Exhale on Rebel Alliance Records.

The band again worked with Change Of Plan's producer Peter Miles. Random Hand recorded the album in November 2008 and it was released in February. Touring with ska punk legends Reel Big Fish followed a 21 date January headline tour in support of the new album. Separate tours with Canadian punks Propagandhi and Manchester peers Sonic Boom Six took place in April and May 2009.

Visibility and awareness of the second album in comparison to Change Of Plan increased with more investment from the band and new label. A video was released for debut single 'Anger Management', which was released on CD and download in September 2009. Prior to the release, the band embarked on a 14 date UK headline tour with UK reggae band The Skints.

=== Seething Is Believing ===
In late 2009, the band started writing material for a third album. During January and February 2010 the band took part in the Rebel Alliance Tour with The Skints, Mouthwash & Chris Murray, with all the bands having releases on Rebel Alliance Recordings. During this tour, drummer and founding member Joe Dimuantes decided to leave the band.

The band took a few months out to practice with new drummer Sean Howe who had been formerly of The Wayriders and Out From Animals. As well as to finish writing their third album. In the meantime, singer/trombonist Robin Leitch and bassist Joe Tilston played solo shows whilst the band took a break from touring.

To make up for the shows missed due to van problems Random Hand played a clutch of "pay what you want" shows to repay fans for cancelled shows.

In June 2010, the band self re-released their first album, Change of Plan via Bomber Music with some added tracks from their "On The March" EP as Another Change Of Plan and in July the band toured to promote the release. The cover was designed by Simon Mitchell, who has provided the artwork for t-shirts, posters, album and EP covers for many underground bands such as MikeTV.

On 12 December 2010, the band played a triple headline show along with The Creepshow and The Skints. The Hydropaths and ACiD DROP also performed as part of the Slam Dunk punk and ska all day gig at The Cockpit in Leeds.

The third album Seething Is Believing was released on Bomber Music in March 2011.

In April 2012, the band announced that founding member and guitarist Matthew Crosher had been told to leave the band, with Dan Walsh confirmed as his replacement.

=== Hit Reset and hiatus ===
On Facebook (on 15 February), Random Hand announced that they would be going on indefinite hiatus to allow them to spend time with their families. They ended this stage in their careers with a tour and PledgeMusic Campaign to release their final album Hit Reset, which was made available to download for donators on 13 September 2015. They ended their live career in spectacular fashion with their sell out final gig at the Camden Underworld supported by friends in Faintest Idea, River Jumpers and Sonic Boom Six, in the latter of whom provided a lot of support to Random Hand in their early days.

In October 2017, after a two year break, Random Hand announced their return in 2018 with appearances at Mighty Sounds Festival in the Czech Republic, and OutCider Festival and Manchester Punk Festival in the UK.

=== Hit Remix ===
In late October 2021 Random Hand released a collaborative album with bands and artists such as Sonic Boom Six, Voodoo Glow Skulls and Call Me Malcom remixing their previous album Hit Reset featuring the Hit Reset album cover with the appearance of distortion.

=== Random Hand ===
The band released their eponymous fifth album (coinciding with their twentieth anniversary) on 20 September 2023.

In 2026 Robin launched Crossed Bones, a YouTube vlog series reviewing UK motorway service stations, with guest appearances from fellow skapunk trombone players.

== Discography ==
=== Studio, live albums and compilations ===
List of albums
Year	Title	Label	Notes
2007	Change of Plan	Riot Music	
2009	Inhale/Exhale	Rebel Alliance	
2010	Another Change of Plan	Bomber Music; Our Records	Compilation of Change of Plan and On the March
2010	Inhale/Exhale	Bomber Music; Our Records	
2011	Seething Is Believing	Bomber Music; Our Records	
2013	Live In K-Town	Bomber Music; Our Records	
2015	Hit Reset	Bomber Music; Our Records	
2021	Hit Remix	Bomber Music; Our Records	
2023	Random Hand	Bomber Music; Our Records	

=== EPs ===
List of EPs
Year	Title	Label
2003	Buy This, Copy It and Give It to Your Friends (Demo No. 1)	Self-released
2005	On the March	Self-released

=== Singles ===
List of singles
Year	Title	Label
2009	Anger Management	Rebel Alliance
2011	Find What's Out There	Bomber Music
2011	Bones	Bomber Music
