= Babar Luck =

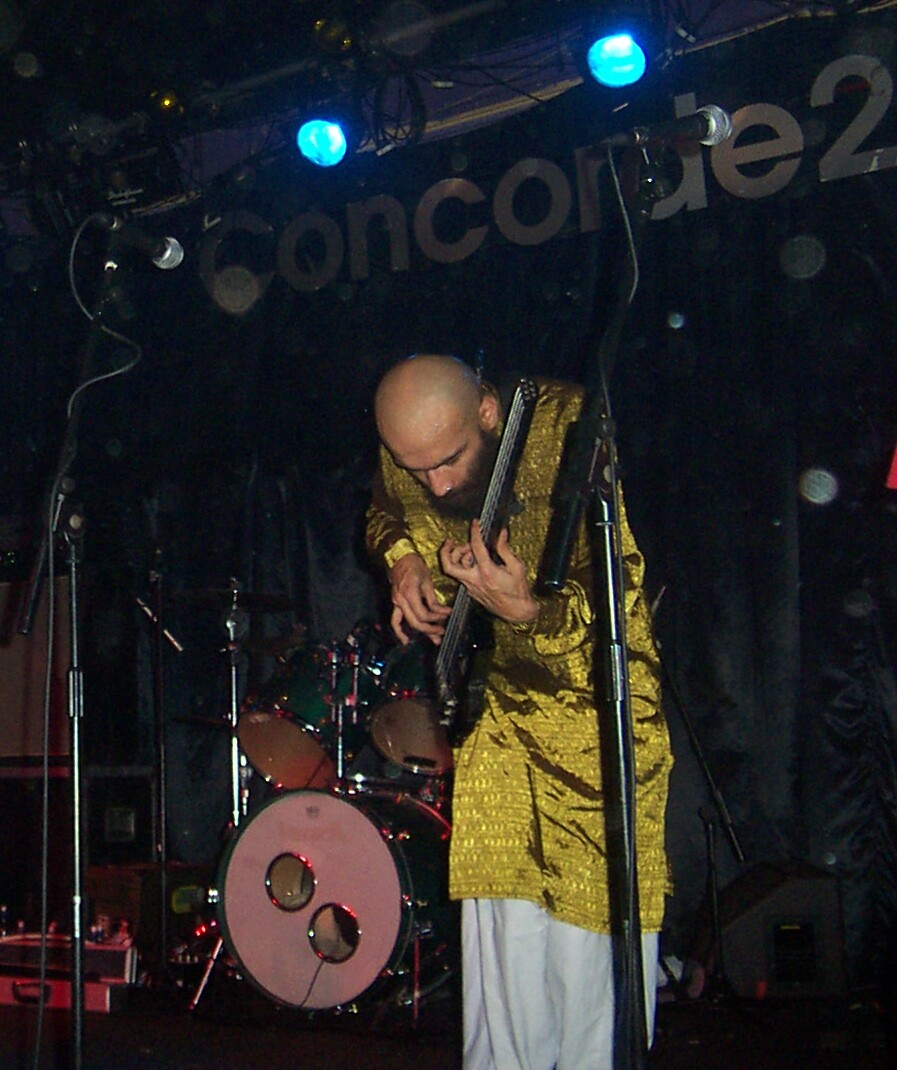
- Babar Luck onstage at Concorde 2 whilst playing with King Prawn, 2002

Background information
- Born: 1970 (age 55–56); Pakistan
- Genres: Punk
- Occupation: Musician
- Instruments: Bass guitar and saz
- Works: First Offence
- Years active: 1993–present
- Member of: East End Trinity; Babar Luck's World Citizen Folk Band
- Formerly of: King Prawn
- Website: babarluck.com

Babar Luck is a songwriter and musician based in the United Kingdom. Born in Pakistan in 1970 he moved to London at the age of eight years and was educated in Canning Town.

== Background ==
Former bassist of the British skacore band King Prawn, Babar Luck has also recorded with numerous musicians including Suicide Bid and Ocarina, and has also performed and recorded material with Sandra Falk, Captain Hotknives, and Lu Edmonds. He continues to create music with an array of players from all walks of life.

Babar Luck has also performed at many festivals of various genres including Trans Musicales in Brittany, Beautiful Days in Devon, and Zealand's massive Roskilde Festival.

Babar Luck has performed and recorded under several project names, including East End Trinity, Babar Luck's World Citizen Folk Band, Remaking Europe, and the Babar Luck Experience.

== Biography ==
In 2006, Babar Luck released solo album Care in the community which the New Internationalist described as "extraordinary".

In January 2010 Babar Luck accepted an invitation to perform at the TEDx conference in Istanbul, Turkey with the theme "The Limits of Tolerance".

== Discography ==
=== Solo or own band ===
- Babar Luck (album, Rebel Music Records, 2005)
- Care in the Community (album, Rebel Music Records, 2006)
- World Citizen Frankenstaanee (album, self-released, 2007)
- Journeys (mini-album, self-released, 2008)
- Bout Time: Recorded 1998–2005 (mini-album, self-released, 2010)
- The Chronicles of John Brute (digital album, Offcut Records, 2012)
- The Babar Luck World Citizen Folk Band (s/t, limited edition, self-released, 2010)

=== Duets ===
Captain Hotknives

- Hot Knives & Luck: Knocking on Heaven's Door (limited edition, self-released, 2010)

Sandra Falk

- LuckFalk (mini-album, self-released, 2004)

=== Band member ===
Remaking Europe

- Remaking Europe (limited edition, self-released, 2012)

East End Trinity

- Got No Fear At All (limited edition, self-released, 2010)
- Chukka (limited edition, self-released, 2012)
- Spice on Spice (forthcoming, 2026)

Suicide Bid

- The Rot Stops Here (album, Household Name Records, 2006)
- This is the Generation (mini-album, Household Name Records, 2005)

King Prawn

- First Offence (album, Words of Warning, 1995)
- Fried in London (album, Words of Warning, 1998)
- Your Worst Enemy (EP, Spitfire, 1999)
- Surrender to the Blender (album, Spitfire, 2000)
- Got the Thirst (album, Golf Records, 2003)

=== Contributions ===
Random Hand

- Inhale/Exhale (album, Bomber Music, 2010) (appeared/co-wrote on final track 'Save Us In This World')

== Performance history ==
Babar Luck's previous live performances at festivals & events include

- 2005 - Womex - UK
- 2006 - Transmusicale Festival - FRANCE
- 2006 - Roskilde Festival - DENMARK
- 2007 - Rebellion Festival - Wintergardens, Blackpool, UK
- 2008 - Rebellion Festival - Wintergardens, Blackpool, UK
- 2008 - Portugal Film Festival - PORTUGAL
- 2008 - Premier Massy Festival - FRANCE
- 2009 - Beautiful Days Festival - UK
- 2009 - St Barnabas Community Fete (Bowstock) - UK
- 2010 - St Barnabas Community Fete (Bowstock) - UK
- 2010 - TedX Conference Series: “The Limits Of Tolerance” - Istanbul, TURKEY
- 2011 - Slam Dunk Festival - UK
- 2014 - Properstock Festival, Milton Keynes - UK
- 2015. - MK11 Kiln Farm Club, Milton Keynes, UK
- 2018 - Wonkfest, UK.
