= City of Thieves (album) =

City Of Thieves

Studio album by Sonic Boom Six
- Released: 30 April 2009
- Genre: Punk/Ska punk
- Length: 44:36
- Label: Rebel Alliance
- Producer: Peter Miles

Sonic Boom Six chronology
Arcade Perfect (2007)	City Of Thieves (2009)	Sonic Boom Six (2012)

Professional ratings
Review scores
Source	Rating
Rock Sound	9/10 stars
Punktastic	5/5 stars
Sputnikmusic	4.5/5 stars
DailyMusicGuide	3.5/5 stars
AltSounds	(9.4/10)

City of Thieves is the third full-length album released by Manchester, UK-based Sonic Boom Six, and the fifth record to be released on their own Rebel Alliance Recordings. Whilst SB6's eclectic punk soundclash staunchly remains far too down-to-earth to ever being described as 'prog', the album follows the concept of a collection of songs that explore and examine life in a large UK city.

== Track listing ==
1. (Welcome To) The City Of Thieves - 2:42
2. Back 2 Skool - 3:33
3. The Road To Hell Is Paved With Good Inventions - 3:40
4. Bang! Bang! Bang! Bang! - 3:59
5. A Bright Cold Day In April - 2:43
6. Rum Little Skallywag - 2:42
7. The Concrete We're Trapped Within (It's Yours) - 3:56
8. Strange Transformations - 3:56
9. Through The Eyes Of A Child - 3:49
10. Polished Chrome And Open Kitchens - 4:31
11. Jericho - 3:35
12. Floating Away - 5:27

=== 2011 UK CD version ===
13. Nine Stitches
14. The Dangers of Rock n Roll
15. This is Real
16. Bang! Bang! Bang! Bang! [Midas Mix]
