= Soulforce Revolution =

Studio album by 7 Seconds
- Released: 1989
- Genre: Melodic hardcore
- Label: Restless

7 Seconds chronology
Ourselves (1988)	Soulforce Revolution (1989)	alt.music.hardcore (1995)

Soulforce Revolution is an album by hardcore punk band 7 Seconds. It was released by Restless Records in 1989, and peaked at No. 153 on the Billboard charts. The band supported the album with a North American tour.

The album featured a slower, more melodic punk sound.

== Critical reception ==
The St. Louis Post-Dispatch praised "Seconds' powerful vocals, Steve Youth's rapid-fire bass lines, the excellent use of additional percussion by drummer Troy Mowatt, and Chris Carnahan's impressive debut on guitar." The State noted the "ferocious power tunes with loud, layered guitars and rapid-fire drumming" and the "thoughtful melodious rockers."

== Track listing ==
All songs written by Kevin Seconds.

1. "Satyagraha" - 3:09
2. "Busy Little People" - 3:27
3. "I Can Sympathize" - 2:45
4. "It All Makes Less Sense Now" - 3:24
5. "Mother's Day" - 4:15
6. "Tribute Freedom Landscape" - 2:52
7. "Copper Ledge" - 2:08
8. "Tickets to a Better Place" - 2:23
9. "4 A.M. in Texas" - 3:18
10. "Soul to Keep (For Phillis)" - 3:34
11. "Swansong" - 1:53

== Personnel ==
- Kevin Seconds: lead vocals
- Chris Carnahan: guitar, vocals
- Troy Mowat: drums
- Steve Youth: bass, piano
