= Surrender to the Blender =

Studio album by King Prawn
- Released: 22 August 2000
- Genre: Ska punk
- Length: 39:13
- Label: Spitfire

King Prawn chronology
Your Worst Enemy EP (1999)	Surrender to the Blender (2000)	Got the Thirst (2003)

Professional ratings
Review scores
Source	Rating
AllMusic	3/5 stars
Visions	6/12

Surrender to the Blender is the third album of London ska punk band King Prawn. It was released on 22 August 2000. Their previous album was Fried in London in 1998.

== Track listing ==
1. Intro
2. Someone to Hate
3. No Peace
4. Day In Day Out
5. London Born
6. Be Warned
7. The Postman Song
8. Your Worst Enemy
9. American Funded Genocide
10. Amuse the Young & Amaze the Old
11. Espiritu Du Carnaval
12. Crackhead
13. The Postman Song (2nd Post)
14. People Taking Over
15. Freedom Day
