= Spunge =

British ska punk band

- Origin: Tewkesbury, England
- Genre: Ska punk
- Years active: 1994–present
- Labels: Sucka-Punch, Moon Ska, B-Unique, Dent'All
- Members: Alex Copeland; Damon "Des" Robins; Chris "Jarvis" Murphy; Jeremy "Jem" King
- Past members: Paul "Wol" Gurney; Simon Bayliss; Martin Holt

Spunge (often typeset as [spunge]) is a ska punk band from Tewkesbury, England. Through many years of touring, Spunge have toured with or played alongside a number of UK bands; and several American bands such as Green Day, Dropkick Murphys and Reel Big Fish; and been supported on a UK tour by Bowling for Soup; the latter of whom contributed backing vocals to the song "Centerfold" on the That Should Cover It! album.

In 2019 the band toured the UK supporting Reel Big Fish, playing the same set they recorded for the album Live in 'nam... (Cheltenham)

== History ==
=== Pedigree Chump and Room for Abuse ===
Conceived in July 1994, with almost the same line up as today (the only difference being that Copeland used to double up on bass), the band went through a lengthy gestation period (adding bassist Simon Bayliss in 1995, and replacing him with Martin Holt in 1997), before emerging with the Kicking Pigeons EP in 1998. Having sold 5000 copies at pub gigs the band decided that there was enough potential to leave their day jobs, and make the band a full-time concern. Having soon gained a manager in Dave Juste of Birmingham's Xposure Rock Cafe (a regular early haunt), Spunge hit the road, and would eventually notch up well over three hundred gigs in just two years.

Cover to Kicking Pigeons.

Less than a year later in 1999, Spunge released their début album Pedigree Chump on MoonSka Europe and thus set about introducing the band to a wider audience. Holt tired of touring, so good friend Chris Murphy joined to play bass.

Their second album Room for Abuse was recorded at DEP International Studios, and released on Sucka-Punch Records in 2000, featuring the single "Ego" plus covers of Bob Marley's "No Woman No Cry" and Sublime's "Santeria". The album version of "No Woman No Cry" – complete with new lyrics from Copeland – was the first cover of a Bob Marley song ever to receive permission to be altered by the Marley family, as Ziggy liked it so much. All this attention brought them to the eyes of B-Unique and a deal was signed in February 2002.

=== The Story So Far ===
The new recording contract led to Spunge's third studio album, The Story So Far. It spent one week in the UK Albums Chart at No. 48. The first single to be taken from it was "Jump on Demand". Produced by John Cornfield, "Jump on Demand" reached No. 39 in the UK Singles Chart. It also topped the Kerrang! TV chart for two weeks. The follow-up "Roots", peaked at No. 52 in the UK chart. However, communication between the band and their record label was not good. Both releases had been delayed after the band had arranged sold-out tours and promotional appearances.

The album, The Story So Far, was then scheduled for release at the end of August 2002 on the same day as the Reading and Leeds Festivals which the band were playing. The band then recorded a cover of "Oliver's Army" with Steve Harris, which Alex Donnelly at BBC Radio 1 stated he would 'A list'. The label again asked for a tour to go with the release, and that was arranged for November and December 2002. The band were in full control of all the promotion for the tour and most shows were sold out with over 15,000 tickets sold to Spunge fans. With no financial support from the label, and no press coverage, the planned single was not released.

Following a meeting in December between label and the band's management, Spunge and B-Unique parted company. Despite this the band went on to play the inaugural Download Festival at Castle Donington in July 2003, alongside Audioslave, NOFX and Metallica. They parted company with their manager, Dave Juste, around this time, and decided to manage themselves. They also created their own record label, Dent'All Records, in 2004. All subsequent recordings have been released on this label.

=== That Should Cover It! ===
On 23 February 2004, the label released its first album, That Should Cover It! a collection of covers, previously unavailable live demos and two brand new songs. The album was successful, with sales still continuing.

During 2004, the band returned to the recording studio to record two tracks for the next album, with the intention of producing a video for one of them to coincide with a major tour in October and November 2004. The two tracks were "Backstabber" and "One More Go". A video was commissioned through Goblin Pictures for "One More Go" and was sent out to several television stations in the hope of getting it played on air. Spunge also decided to put on an all-day gig at Cheltenham Town Hall. Hosted by Dent'All Records and Spunge, this became Extraction Fest 2004. The show was a success, but the video did not get aired, but their planned autumnal tour with Whitmore and Phinius Gage went ahead.

The band decided to release a full length DVD (The High Life) incorporating the video for "One More Go" on 21 March 2005.

=== Album re-release and self-titled album ===
Rhythm guitarist Wol (Paul Gurney) left the band in January 2006, for personal reasons. Spunge decided to carry on as a four piece.

On 6 November 2006, Spunge released a re-recorded version of their second album called Room for Abuse 2006 that also included a DVD, which was also a re-release of their first video Skankin 'N' Skulkin.

On 20 August 2007, the band announced it had finished the fourth studio album and would be releasing it on 12 November. The album was self-titled. In October 2007, as part of the promotion for their new album, Spunge released as a free download on their website and Myspace site, their b-side "Happy Ending". The band undertook two tours supporting the album's release.

On Monday 3 September 2011, the band digitally released a new double A single, "Nothing at All"/"Higher Ground", following recording sessions earlier in the year.

On 25 November 2013 the band released Greatest Hit......S album which is a compilation of their greatest hits voted by fans during the PledgeMusic project. Band said they are letting the fans to decide the track listing for the album. All of the tracks were re-recorded in 2013 for this album and few of them were mixed up a bit. Greatest Hit......S is sold in CD format only by the band themselves at their shows. The digital version is widely available through digital music stores and services.

=== Hang On? and single releases (2014–present) ===
Spunge announced through social media that they are making a new studio-album which will be released in digital format on 5 December for everyone who has preordered it from their PledgeMusic event. The physical CD will be only available for preorder through PledgeMusic and won't even be available for sale at the shows. This will be the band's 8th full-length album and 5th album with new original tracks.

In late 2018 the band released two new singles "Liar" and "Get Out" through the band's own label, Dent’All Records. The band announced in an interview that they are writing new songs and instead of a new album release they will be releasing the new tracks regularly throughout 2019 as singles.

On 4 November a new single "No One Said It Was Easy" and a music video was released. The video accompanying the single is filmed and produced by Elliot Withers from Lion Island Media.

In addition to Singles, after their latest album the band has also released 2 Live Albums: "Live in London EP" (2016) and "Live in 'nam... (Cheltenham)" (2019).

== Band members ==
=== Current members ===
- Alex Copeland (vocals)
- Damon Robins (lead guitar)
- Chris Murphy (bass guitar)
- Jeremy King (drums)

=== Former members ===
- Paul Gurney (rhythm guitar)
- Simon Bayliss (bass guitar)
- Martin Holt (bass guitar)

== Discography ==
=== Albums ===
- Pedigree Chump – 1 March 1999
- Room for Abuse – 9 October 2000
- The Story So Far – 26 August 2002 – UK No. 48
- That Should Cover It! – 23 February 2004
- Room for Abuse 2006 – 6 November 2006
- Spunge – 12 November 2007
- Greatest Hit......s – 25 November 2013
- Hang On? – 4 December 2014
- Live in London – 27 May 2016
- Live in 'nam... (Cheltenham) – 7 October 2019

=== EPs ===
- The Kicking Pigeons EP – March 1998

=== Singles ===
- "Ego" – 19 June 2000
- "Live Another Day/Kicking Pigeons 2001" – 12 February 2001
- "Jump on Demand" – 3 June 2002 – UK No. 39
- "Roots" – 12 August 2002 – UK No. 52
- "One More Go" – 21 March 2005
- "Backstabber" – 14 January 2006, download only
- "Nothing at All/Higher Ground" – 29 August 2011, download only
- "Liar" - 19 October 2018
- "Get Out" - 23 November 2018
- "No One Said It Was Easy" - 4 November 2019
- "Just Sayings" - 20 November 2020
- "Problem/Solution" - 3 October 2025

=== Music videos ===
- "Kicking Pigeons" (1998)
- "Ego" (2000)
- "Jump on Demand" (2002)
- "Roots" (2002)
- "Centrefold" (2004)
- "One More Go" (2005)
- "Everyone Else" (2014)
- "No One Said It Was Easy" (2019)

=== Videos ===
- Skankin 'n' Skulkin – 2001

=== DVDs ===
- The High Life
