= St Barnabas Community Fete =

Music festival in London, England

Coordinates: 51.5311°N 0.0416°W

St Barnabas Community Fete (Bowstock)
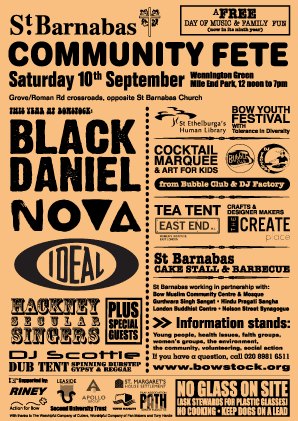
- 2011 poster
- Genre: Mixed
- Dates: Early September
- Locations: Bow, London, England
- Years active: 2003-2012
- Founders: Local residents
- Website: www.bowstock.org

St Barnabas Community Fete (also known as Bowstock) was an annual fête and music festival held on Wennington Green in Mile End Park, Bow, London, England. It was run by local volunteers, who started the fete in 2003 as a non-religious, participatory, free and not-for-profit festival to bring together residents of all ages, faiths, abilities and races, to draw attention to local issues and to encourage volunteering and community action. The festival was directed by the vicar of St Barnabas, Father Brian Ralph, nicknamed the "rock vicar". The festival ran until 2012.

Musical artists played alongside acts from local schools and the community, and acts who have performed there include Babar Luck, The Beat, Black Daniel, The Blockheads, The Bollywood Brass Band, Chas'n'Dave, Saynab Cige, The Dhol Foundation, Heavy Load, Joi, Finley Quaye (a surprise guest at the first fete in 2003), Alaur Rahman, DJ Ritu, Sham 69, Neville Staple, U.K Subs, and Jah Wobble. The festival attracted around 2,000 people.

Around the live music stage, the organisers provided an information marketplace for community groups, and a range of activities for all ages, including a tea dance and extreme sports.

== Poster gallery ==
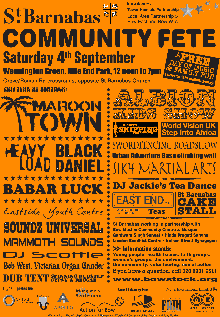
2010 poster

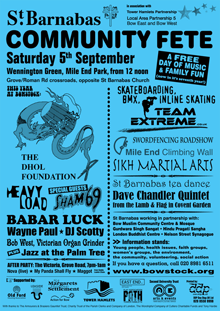
2009 poster

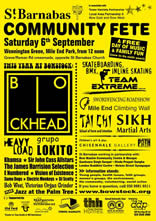
2008 poster

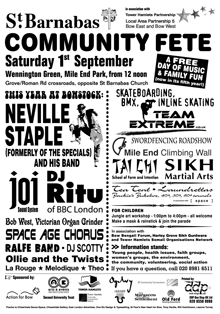
2007 poster

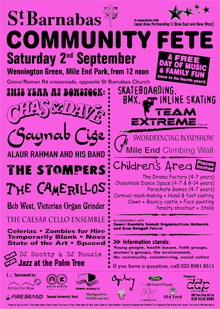
2006 poster

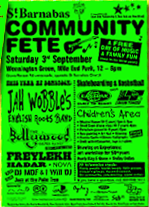
2005 poster

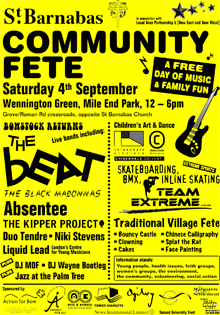
2004 poster

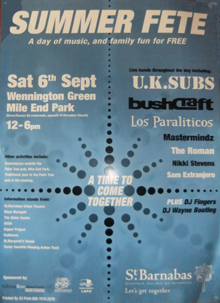
2003 poster
