= The Story So Far (Spunge album) =

Studio album by Spunge
- Released: 26 August 2002
- Recorded: 2002
- Genre: Ska punk, Pop Punk
- Length: 37:16
- Label: B-Unique Records
- Producer: John Cornfield, Chris Sheldon

Spunge chronology
Room for Abuse (2000)	The Story So Far (2002)	That Should Cover It! (2004)

The Story So Far is the third album by the Tewkesbury ska punk band Spunge. It was released on 26 August 2002 on the B-Unique Records label and recorded at two studios, Sawmills and Jacobs. The record was produced by John Cornfield (Supergrass, Muse) and Chris Sheldon (Foo Fighters, Therapy?).

The album perhaps marks a change in the band's sound, from a more laid-back ska style to a more rock sound. Two singles, "Jump on Demand" and "Roots", were released from the album.

The album peaked at #48 on the UK Albums Chart, while the singles "Jump on Demand" and "Roots" peaked at #39 and #52 on the UK singles chart, respectively.

The Story So Far includes a new version of the single "Ego", from Room For Abuse.

== Track listing ==
1. "The Story So Far" – 4:16
2. "Roots" – 3:51
3. "Give It A Try" – 2:34
4. "Change of Scene" – 3:25
5. "Skanking Song" – 2:23
6. "Dotted Line" – 3:28
7. "Ego" – 3:05
8. "Jump on Demand" – 3:35
9. "It's Over" – 2:41
10. "Friend Called Fred" – 3:55
11. "Too Little Too Late" – 3:59
