= Sonic Boom Six (album) =

2012 album

Studio album by Sonic Boom Six
- Released: October 15, 2012
- Genre: Punk rock, ska punk
- Length: 38:08
- Label: Xtra Mile
- Producer: Peter Miles

Sonic Boom Six chronology
City of Thieves (2009)	Sonic Boom Six (2012)	The F-Bomb (2016)

Sonic Boom Six is the self-titled fourth full-length album released by Manchester, UK-based Sonic Boom Six. It is their first album on the label Xtra Mile after many years on smaller labels. The band explained that "We don't want to be preaching to the converted any more, we actually want to change minds and viewpoints, not confirm what people already know."

The album's sound reportedly merges "contemporary electronica, crushing rock riffs, huge vocal hooks and anthemic song-writing." The first single was the song 'Virus', released September 17.

== Track listing ==
1. For the Kids of the Multiculture - 3:35
2. Virus - 3:40
3. Karma is a Bitch - 3:18
4. S.O.S (State of Shock) - 3:39
5. Gary Got a Gun - 3:29
6. The High Cost of Living - 4:07
7. Who Will Survive (and What Will be Left of Them?) - 2:49
8. Keep on Believing - 3:26
9. Flatline - 4:23
10. Karma is a Lady - 5:42
