= First Offence =

Studio album by King Prawn
- Released: 1995 (re-released 2001)
- Recorded: 20–26 December 1995
- Studio: Fortress Studios, London, England
- Genre: Ska punk
- Label: Words of Warning (re-released on Moon Ska Europe)

King Prawn chronology
| First Offence (1995) | Fried in London (1998) |

Professional ratings
Review scores
| Source | Rating |
|---|---|
| AllMusic | 2.5/5 stars |
| Ox-Fanzine | 4/5 stars |
| Visions | 10/12 |

First Offence is the debut album of London-based ska punk band King Prawn. It was released in 1995, and also re-released in 2001.

== Track listing ==
1. "Doledrums"
2. "Salvation"
3. "Boxed & Packaged"
4. "Immigrant Song Too"
5. "Restart (Acts I & II)"
6. "Bossman's Bleeding"
7. "Nobody Like You"
8. "Alien Spawn"
9. "First Defence"

== Re-released track listing ==
1. "Immigrant Song Too"
2. "First Defence"
3. "Boxed & Packaged"
4. "Bossman's Bleeding"
5. "Restart" (Acts I & II)
6. "Doledrums"
7. "Nobody Like You"
8. "Salvation"
9. "Alien Spawn"
10. "Poison in the Air" (Alternative Mix)
11. "Divine Badness" (Alternative Mix)
12. "Holy War" (Live Studio Recording)
13. "Winning Again" (Live Studio Recording)
14. "Buried Alive" (Demo Recording)
15. "Poison in the Air" (Enhanced Video)
