= Fried in London =

1998 album of English band King Prawn

Studio album by King Prawn
- Released: 28 July 1998
- Studio: Blackwing Studios and Southern Studios, London, England
- Genre: Ska punk, hardcore, reggae
- Length: 30:28
- Label: Words of Warning

King Prawn chronology
First Offence (1995)	Fried in London (1998)	Your Worst Enemy EP (1999)

Professional ratings
Review scores
Source	Rating
AllMusic	3/5 stars
Visions	9/12
Ox-Fanzine (2013)	4/5 stars
Ox-Fanzine (1998)	

Fried in London is the second album of London-based ska punk band King Prawn. It was released on 28 July 1998, and re-released in 2001. Their next album was Surrender to the Blender in 2000.

== Track listing ==
1. The Sound of We
2. Not Your Punk
3. Felled
4. Increase the Pressure
5. Role Model
6. Racist Copper
7. Survive
8. Depths of My Soul
9. Clocked
10. Rewards and Prizes
11. Last Request
12. Faith (demo version) - (bonus track on re-release)
13. Come Out (demo version) - (bonus track on re-release)
14. Depths of My Soul (multimedia track) - (bonus track on re-release)
