= Walk Together, Rock Together =

EP by 7 Seconds
- Released: 1985
- Genre: Hardcore punk
- Label: BYO
- Producer: Ian MacKaye

7 Seconds chronology
The Crew (1984)	Walk Together, Rock Together (1985)	Ourselves (1988)

Walk Together, Rock Together is a studio album by hardcore punk band 7 Seconds, released in 1985. The album was originally released as an EP, but was later expanded into a full-length album.

== Background ==
Walk Together, Rock Together was originally released as an EP in 1985. In 1986, it was expanded into a full length by adding live songs to the albums B-Side. The studio tracks were produced by Minor Threat singer Ian MacKaye, who also provided backing vocals, and mixed by Bad Religion guitarist Brett Gurewitz.

== Critical reception ==
Professional ratings
Review scores
Source	Rating
The Encyclopedia of Popular Music	3/5 stars

AllMusic called the album "an essential chapter of early hardcore." Maximum Rocknroll wrote that "all the pleasant harmonies and sing-alongs are present in full form, and the well thought-out lyrics that make this band what they are." Trouser Press wrote that the album "demonstrates an early interest in slowing things down and tuning them up along positive Clash/Pistols lines."

== Track listings ==
All songs written by Kevin Seconds, except where noted.

=== 12” EP (released 1985) ===
Side one

1. "In Your Face" - 1:07
2. "Spread" - 1:09
3. "99 Red Balloons" (Uwe Fahrenkrog-Petersen, Carlo Karges, Kevin McAlea) - 3:41

Side two

1. "Remains to Be Seen" - 1:31
2. "Walk Together, Rock Together" - 1:48
3. "How Do You Think You'd Feel" - 1:34
4. "Strength" - 2:24

Bonus 7” added to 2023 edition

1. "Regress No Way" - 1:09
2. "We're Gonna Fight" - 3:24

=== LP (released 1986) ===
Side one

1. "Regress No Way" - 1:09
2. "We're Gonna Fight" - 3:24
3. "In Your Face" - 1:07
4. "Spread" - 1:09
5. "99 Red Balloons" (Uwe Fahrenkrog-Petersen, Carlo Karges, Kevin McAlea) - 3:41
6. "Remains to Be Seen" - 1:31
7. "Walk Together, Rock Together" - 1:48
8. "How Do You Think You'd Feel" - 1:34
9. "Strength" - 2:24

Side two

1. "Still Believe [Live]" - 1:39
2. "Out of Touch [Live]" - 1:49
3. "Drug Control [Live]" - 0:45
4. "Bottomless Pit [Live]" - 1:23
5. "This Is the Angry Pt. 2 [Live]” - 1:13†
6. “New Wind/We're Gonna Fight [Live]" - 4:03†

† Some digital versions of the album combine the live versions of "This Is the Angry Pt. 2,” “New Wind,” and “We're Gonna Fight" into a single track.

== Personnel ==
- Kevin Seconds: Lead Vocals
- Dan Pozniak: Guitar, Vocals
- Troy Mowat: Drums
- Steve Youth: Bass, Piano
