= Phinius Gage =

English skate punk/melodic hardcore band

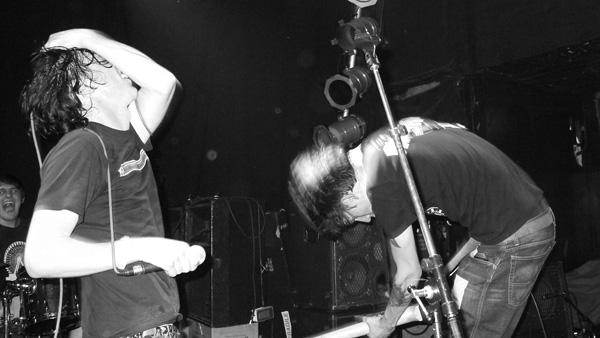
- Ade and Mike of Phinius Gage

Background information
- Origin: Brighton, England, UK
- Genres: Punk rock, skate punk, melodic hardcore
- Years active: 2001–2008, 2024-
- Labels: Disconnect Disconnect Records, Small Town Records, Fond Of Life, Deck Cheese
- Members: Ade Holder; Mike Scott; Gary Yay; Matt Steele

Phinius Gage are an English underground skate punk/melodic hardcore band who started up in 2001. In 2015 they played a reunion tour and announced in 2024 they had reformed. The band's first new music in nearly 2 decades came out in 2025. The band have promised a new full-length in the future.

== History ==
The band is named after Phineas Gage, an 1840s railway foreman, who had a large iron rod driven through his head and thereby lost part of his brain.

They played over 500 shows in their existence, touring with many bands including Streetlight Manifesto, Spunge, Whitmore, Flood Of Red, Reuben, RedLightsFlash, Ten Foot Pole, Farse, and 4Ft Fingers. They released debut mini LP More Haste More Speed in 2003 on Deck Cheese Records – and their first full length, The Feeling Somethings Wrong on the same label in 2005.

Signing to Fond of Life Records in Germany, the band released a compilation of old and new tracks in 2006 entitled Brighton Rock, which included the band's only single, Brighton Rock, the video for which received airplay on MTV2 and Scuzz. The band then released their final album in 2007, Seek Out Your Foes, which is generally considered the band's best work. It made Kerrang's 'Best Albums Of 2007' list. However, the band split suddenly soon after.

Members have gone on to form many other bands, including Lay It On The Line. Mike Scott has also had a solo career.

== Musical style and influence ==
Phinius Gage plays fast, melodic hardcore music in the style of Pennywise, Strung Out, Consumed, Rise Against, and other bands of the SoCal description from record labels including Fat Wreck Chords and Epitaph.

== Members ==
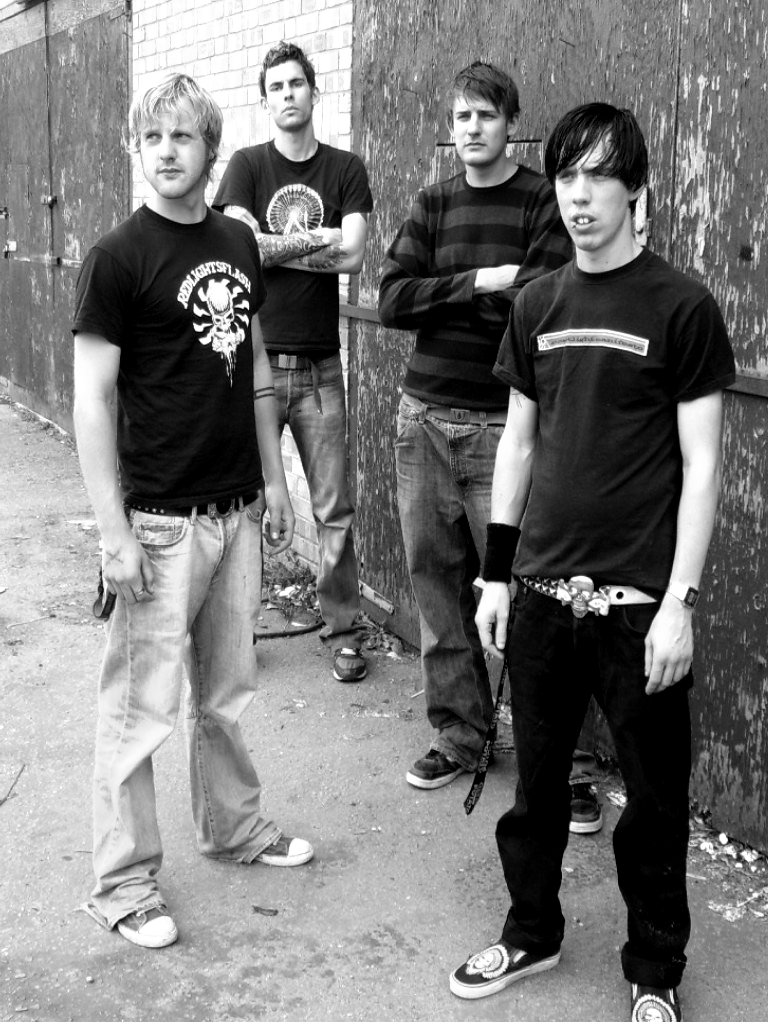

- Gary Yay – guitars, backing vocals (2024–present)
- Mike Scott – (bass, lead vocals, (2003–present)
- Matt Steele – drums, backing vocals (2002–present)
- Ade Holder – guitars, lead vocals (2002–present)

=== Previous members 2002–2006 ===
- Damo St George – vocals
- Carl "Karlos" Brown - guitar
- Martyn Haigh – bass
- Andy Bligh – guitar
- Ben Ince – guitar
- Paul Fields – guitar
- Jamie Kirkpatrick – bass
- Edward Higgs – bass
- Chas Mataz – guitar
- Kalem Buckham – drums
- Keith Whitby – bass

== Discography ==
Year	Album	Label
2003	More Haste More Speed (mini-album)	Deck Cheese
2005	The Feeling Something's Wrong	Deck Cheese
2006 (Europe); 2007 (UK)	Brighton Rock	Fond of Life/Winged Skull (Europe); Fond of Life/Plastic Head (UK)
2006/2007 (Re-release)	Seek Out Your Foes... And Make Them Sorry	Fond of Life (Europe); Small Town Records (UK)
2025	Masquerade (Single)	Self-released

=== Compilations ===
- Amped Up And Ready To Go (In At The Deep End Records, UK)
- Value Slices (Deck Cheese, UK)
- Cheese Supreme (free promo CD with Big Cheese Magazine, UK)
- Punktastic Unscene (Punktastic Recordings, UK)
- Punktastic Unscene 3 (Punktastic Recordings, UK)
- Ashcan Records 1 (Ashcan Records, Luxembourg)
- Change The Station II (White Russian Records, Netherlands)
- In Defense of Rock 2 (Fond of Life/Winged Skull, Germany)
- Quintisentially British (UK)
- Brighton Rocks (UK)
