= Ourselves (album) =

Studio album by 7 Seconds
- Released: 1988
- Genre: Hardcore punk
- Label: Restless

7 Seconds chronology
Walk Together, Rock Together (1985)	Ourselves (1988)	Soulforce Revolution (1989)

Ourselves is a 1988 album by hardcore punk band 7 Seconds.

== Critical reception ==
Professional ratings
Review scores
Source	Rating
The Encyclopedia of Popular Music	3/5 stars

Trouser Press called Ourselves "state of the art: intelligent lyrics of personal and political consequence, moderately powerful singing, buzzing guitars and brisk tempos." Spin called it "fun, fast and smart—a pleasant alternative to mall-born pop slush and three-time losers retreading Dolls riffs."

== Track listing ==
All songs written by Kevin Seconds, except where noted.

1. "Escape and Run" - 2:52
2. "Far Away Friends" (Seconds, Steve Youth) - 2:41
3. "Save Ourselves" - 3:07
4. "If I Abide" - 3:23
5. "Wish I Could Help" - 2:27
6. "Sleep" (Youth) - 3:35
7. "Sister" - 2:04
8. "Middleground" - 4:28
9. "When One Falls" (Seconds, Youth) - 3:30
10. "Some Sort of Balance" (Seconds, Youth) - 2:49
11. "Seven Years" (Seconds, Youth, Troy Mowat) - 4:06

== Personnel ==
- Kevin Seconds: Lead vocals
- Bob Adams: Guitar, vocals
- Troy Mowat: Drums
- Steve Youth: Bass, piano
