= Alt.music.hardcore =

alt.music.hardcore

Studio album by 7 Seconds
- Released: November 7, 1995
- Genre: Hardcore punk
- Length: 18:38
- Label: Headhunter/Cargo

7 Seconds chronology
Soulforce Revolution (1989)	alt.music.hardcore (1995)	Good To Go (1999)

Professional ratings
Review scores
Source	Rating
Allmusic	3/5 stars

Alt.music.hardcore is the tenth studio LP by hardcore punk band 7 Seconds. It is a compilation of the 1982 Skins, Brains, and Guts 7-inch EP, the 1983 Committed for Life 7-inch EP, and the 1985 Blast From the Past EP

== Track listing ==
1. "Skins, Brains, and Guts" - 0:55
2. "No Authority" – 0:51
3. "Redneck Society" – 0:41
4. "Baby Games" – 0:27
5. "Racism Sucks" – 2:26
6. "This Is My Life" – 1:08
7. "Anti-Clan" – 1:06
8. "I Hate Sports" – 0:41
9. "We're Gonna Fight" – 2:31
10. "5 Years of Lies" – 0:44
11. "Drug Control" – 0:39
12. "Bottomless Pit" – 1:32
13. "Fight Your Own Fight" – 1:06
14. "Committed for Life" – 1:25
15. "This Is the Angry" – 1:06
16. "Aggro" – 1:06
17. "War in the Head" – 0:41
18. "The Kids Are United" – 2:53
