= Arcade Perfect (album) =

Studio album by Sonic Boom Six
- Released: 12 November 2007
- Genre: Punk rock
- Length: 39:34
- Label: Rebel Alliance
- Producer: Peter Miles

Sonic Boom Six chronology
The Ruff Guide to Genre-Terrorism (2006)	Arcade Perfect (2007)	Play On (2008)

Arcade Perfect is Sonic Boom Six's second full-length CD, and their first on their own Rebel Alliance Recordings label. It was released in the UK, via their online store, on 12 November 2007 with a full nationwide release a week later.

== Track listing ==
1. Arcade Perfect - 2:51
2. While You Were Sleeping - 3:35
3. Sound of a Revolution - 3:15
4. Tell Me Something That I Don’t Know - 3:40
5. The Strange Tale of Sid the Strangler - 2:58
6. Flower - 4:41
7. Meanwhile, Back in the Real World... - 2:56
8. September to May - 3:20
9. Ya Basta! [Rebel Alliance Mix] - 4:00
10. I Wish I Could Smile - 4:29
11. For 12 Weeks, the City is Theirs - 3:54

=== 2011 UK CD version ===
12. We Wanna War [Demo]
13. Fear and Loathing in Whalley Range [Demo]
14. Meanwhile, Back in the Real World... [Demo]
15. Ya Basta! [Tim G Remix]
