= Inhale/Exhale (Random Hand album) =

Album by Random Hand

Studio album by Random Hand
- Released: January 2009
- Genres: Third wave ska, Ska-core
- Length: 44:14
- Label: Rebel Alliance Records
- Producer: Peter Miles

Random Hand chronology
Change of Plan (2007)	Inhale/Exhale (2009)	Another Change of Plan (2010)

Inhale/Exhale is the second full-length release by UK-based band, Random Hand.

== Track listing ==
1. I, Human
2. The Right Reasons
3. British
4. Anger Management
5. Roots in the Crowd
6. Devil's Little Guinea Pigs
7. "In"
8. Mass Producing Monsters
9. For Roni
10. A Spider in the Sink
11. The Eyeballs Of War
12. What it Takes
