= Room for Abuse =

Room For Abuse

Studio album by Spunge
- Released: 9 October 2000
- Recorded: 2000
- Genre: Ska punk
- Length: 61:07
- Label: Sucka-Punch Records
- Producer: Spunge

Spunge chronology
Pedigree Chump (1999)	Room For Abuse (2000)	The Story So Far (2002)

Professional ratings
Review scores
Source	Rating
Allmusic	3/5 stars

Room for Abuse is the second full-length album by the Tewkesbury ska punk band Spunge. It was released on 9 October 2000 on Sucka-Punch Records, and recorded at DEP International Studios, Birmingham (the studio owned by UB40).

Two singles were released from the album, "Ego" and "Live Another Day" (which was a double A-side with a new version of "Kicking Pigeons" from their Pedigree Chump album). "No Woman No Cry" is a cover of the famous Bob Marley song, to which the Marley family officially gave Spunge permission to change the lyrics. "Santeria" is a cover of the Sublime song.

== Track listing ==
1. "Live Another Day" – 4:04
2. "Get Along" – 2:31
3. "Break Up" – 3:44
4. "No Woman No Cry" – 4:25
5. "All Gone Wrong" – 3:30
6. "Dubstyle" – 4:18
7. "Wake Up Call" – 2:58
8. "Disco Kid" – 4:08
9. "All She Ever Wants" – 5:26
10. "Ego" – 3:04
11. "Second Rate" – 3:12
12. "Nothing to Hide" – 4:02
13. "Go Away" – 3:18
14. "Rockabilly" – 3:23
15. "Santeria" – 3:47
16. "Room for Abuse" – 5:07
