= King Prawn (band) =

English ska punk band

- King Prawn in 2026

Background information
- Origin: London, England, UK
- Genres: Punk Rock; Ska; Alternative
- Years active: 1993–2003 2012–present
- Labels: Words of Warning; Spitfire Records; Moon Ska Records; Golf Records; Cherry Red Records
- Members: Al Rumjen; Devil Hands; Tim Macdonald; Zac Chang; Russell Spencer; Nick Horn
- Past members: Babar Luck; Nick Smith
- Website: king-prawn.co.uk

King Prawn are an English ska punk band founded in 1993. The band split in 2003, later reforming for a second run in 2012.

== History ==
The band's formation was in London, 1993. The first major recording was First Offence three years later, produced by Martin "Ace" Kent of Skunk Anansie.

King Prawn toured regularly with a broad range of bands, varying from hardcore to traditional and 2 Tone ska bands.

The band called time on their first incarnation in 2003.

=== Hiatus ===
After the band split, Babar Luck, the bass player, started to perform under his own name. In 2006, he released the album Care in the Community, and has since released several solo and collaborative recordings.

In the summer of 2007, Al Rumjen joined Asian Dub Foundation as their new vocalist. His first performance as a member of Asian Dub Foundation was at the WOMAD Festival in Singapore and his first album with the band was Punkara.

=== Reformation ===
In 2012, the band reformed and played festivals and a club tour. They featured an extended brass section with a keys player, but without Babar Luck.

In 2013, the band played at Boomtown Festival and Reading & Leeds Festivals and completed a UK tour in November 2013.

The band released two tracks on the Bandcamp platform in 2013.

A fifth LP was released in April 2019 called The Fabulous new sounds of ... on Cherry Red Records.

In 2020, the band released two singles and started work on their sixth album.

== Awards ==
They were nominated for a Kerrang! award in 1998 for Best New British Band, and in 2000 for Spirit of Independence.

== Style ==
King Prawn blend elements of punk, hardcore, metal, ska, dub, reggae, and hip hop into their music, which they dub "wildstyle". In 2016, Jones stated that The Dead Kennedys, Crass, Public Enemy, Rage Against the Machine, and Bob Marley all influenced the band.

== Members ==
=== Current members ===
- Al Rumjen - vocals
- Devil Hands - guitar
- Tim Macdonald - drums
- Zac Chang - bass guitar
- Russell Spencer - trombone
- Nick Horne - keyboards & trumpet

=== Former members ===
- Babar Luck - bass guitar
- Nick Smith - drums

== Discography ==
=== Studio albums ===
- First Offence - 1995, (extended EP, 2001 remastered & re-released)
- Fried in London - 1998, (2001 remastered & re-released)
- Surrender to the Blender - 2000
- Got the Thirst - 2003
- The Fabulous New Sounds of... - 2019

=== Singles and EPs ===
- Poison in the Air - 1995
- Felled/ Depths of my Soul - 1997
- Not Your Punk - 1997
- Your Worst Enemy (EP) - 1999
- Day In Day Out - 2000
- Someone to Hate - 2000
- Done Days / A Solemn Man - 2014
- Rockas an' Them - 2020
- New Vibrations - 2020
- Propaganda - 2026
- Take Me Back - 2026
- Lose My Senses - 2026
- U Fake - 2026
- Untitled EP (Vinyl) - 2026

=== Music videos ===
- "Depths of My Soul" (1997)
- "Day In Day Out" (2000)
- "Someone to Hate" (2000)
- "The Dominant View" (2003)
