= Lay It on the Line (band) =

British melodic hardcore band

Lay It On The Line
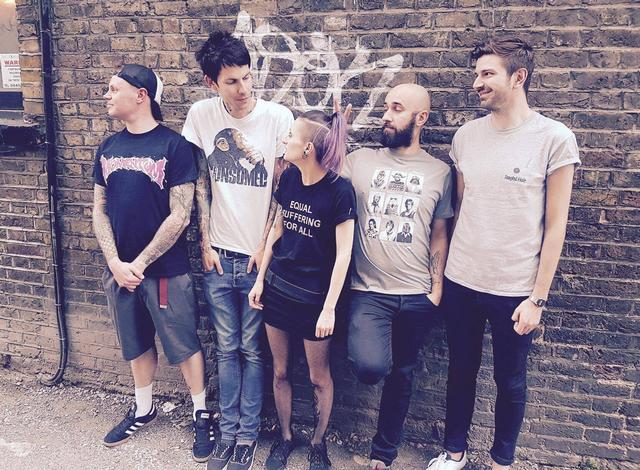
- Lay It On The Line in 2017

Background information
- Origin: London, England
- Genres: Hardcore punk, melodic hardcore
- Years active: 2012–present
- Label: Disconnectdisconnect records
- Members: Alice Hour – vocals – guitar – drums Donuts – bass Mike Scott – vocals, guitar
- Past members: Matt Scott; Matt Ash; Tristan Chate; Dave Smith; Hannah Fautley; Jakub Jalowiec; James Eaton-Brown
- Website: http://www.layitontheline.bandcamp.com, https://open.spotify.com/artist/42jhRtPssCoX3RQikIbILY?si=NLKL1Fa7Sd6WWHcOJRnHyg

Lay It On The Line are a British melodic hardcore band from London. They were formed in 2012 by Phinius Gage member Mike Scott, his brother Matt and Dave Smith, who was originally guitarist in Not Katies. They wrote their demo in a single evening and recorded it in a single day. Championed by Radio 1 DJ Mike Davies before they had played a show, the band have so far gone on to release four EPs and, featuring a new line-up, their debut album The Black Museum, was released on Disconnect, Disconnect Records on 30 June 2017. Their current line-up also features Donuts on bass, who is formerly of Hang The Bastard. As of 2018, they were in the studio recording their second album.

== Discography ==
Date of Release	Title
2012	Midnight in the Bellagio (Demo Recording) A Lesson in Personal Finance EP (Based on the story of the headmaster who was murdered at the school Mike and Matt attended)
2013	Crowhurst EP (Based on the story of Donald Crowhurst) Split with Belgian band Arizona. 7" vinyl release - 2 songs from each band. Lay It On The Line's song Therapia Lane is about the murder of personal friend Ben Gardner, killed in their home town in 2009. Vigilance EP (Based on the testimony of George Hutchinson, witness in the Whitechapel Murders in 1888.
2015	A Prelude To The Process EP (Based on the teachings of Robert DeGrimston and The Process Church of The Final Judgment)
2017	The Black Museum LP
2020	A Candle In Hell LP
