= Moon Ska World =

British record label

Moon Ska World, formerly known as Moon Ska Europe, was a ska record label based in the United Kingdom. It was founded in 1998 as the European sister label of the defunct American label Moon Ska Records, which was owned by Robert "Bucket" Hingley of The Toasters. Moon Ska World is a licensed affiliate run by Laurie "Lol" Pryor, former manager of The Business and Dojo Records and Link Records head. Due to illnesses in both Pryor and the other principal owner, Sonia "Red" Bailey, as well as deaths in their families, the label was put on hold until 2006, when Pryor changed its name to Moon Ska World and began running the label on his own.

Unlike its American counterpart, Moon Ska Europe released bands from genres outside of ska, but in 2006, the label shifted its focus exclusively towards ska and old reggae. In addition to releasing more than thirty albums licensed from Moon Ska Records, as well as early albums by The Mighty Mighty Bosstones and Buck-O-Nine, Moon Ska Europe released albums by Spunge (who later signed with Warner Bros. Records), Whitmore, King Prawn (re-releases of their first two albums) and Less Than Jake (their debut European release). In 2006, Moon Ska World signed UK underground ska act The Big, European reggae act The Upsessions, Hawaii ska/soul act Go Jimmy Go and former Bodysnatchers and Special AKA vocalist Rhoda Dakar. They also released albums by The Toasters, The Riffs, 2 Tone supergroup Skaville UK, and skinhead reggae act Symarip.

The label's final release was the Peace Love Faith Hope Respect Co-Exist album by the Dub City Rockers in 2011. Pryor died in May 2022.

== Label Roster ==
- The Articles (USA)
- Big D and the Kids Table (USA)
- Dub City Rockers (Jamaica/UK)
- Dumpster Pop
- Fandangle (UK)
- Farse (UK)
- Go Jimmy Go (USA)
- Graveltrap (UK)
- Less Than Jake (USA)
- Lubby Nugget (UK)
- The Mighty Mighty Bosstones (USA)
- Mixtwitch (Ireland)
- Chris Murray (USA)
- Pama International
- The Rudimentals (South Africa)
- Rhoda Dakar
- Sadie's Doll
- The Selecter (UK)
- Shootin' Goon (UK)
- Skaville UK
- Solabeat Alliance (UK)
- Sonic Boom Six (UK)
- Spunge (UK)
- The Toasters (USA)
- Uncle Brian
- The Upsessions (NL)
- Whitmore (UK)
- Zen Baseballbat (UK)

== See also ==
- List of record labels
