= Kevin Seconds =

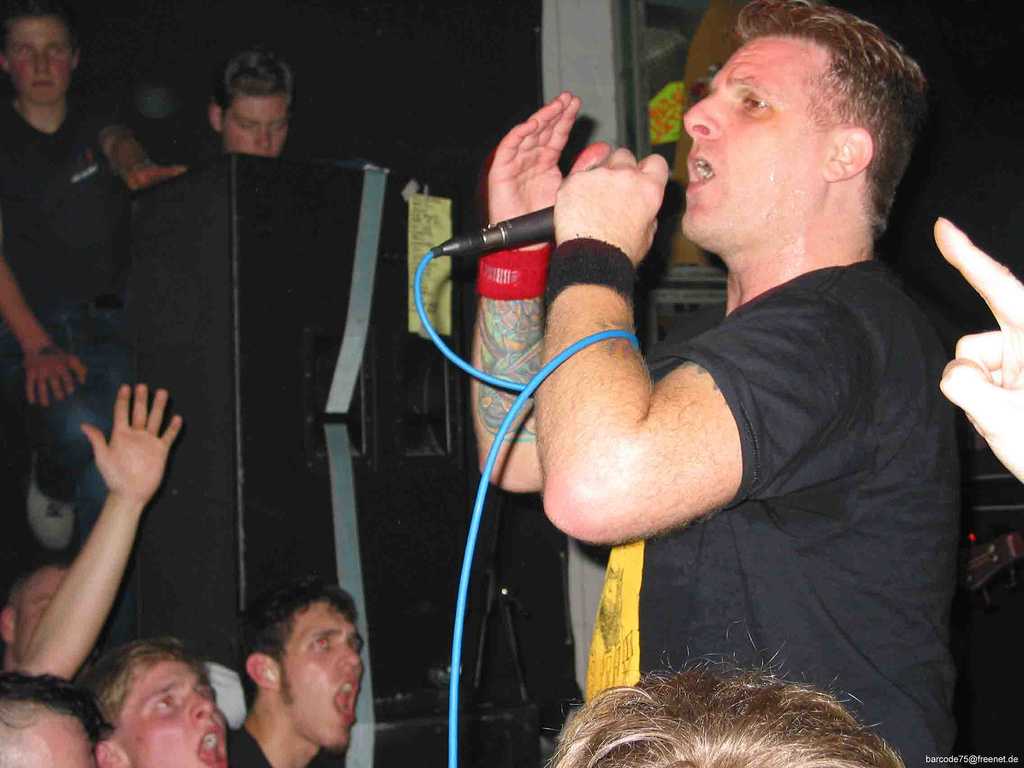
- Seconds in 2005

Background information
- Genres: Punk rock, hardcore punk, melodic hardcore, alternative rock, folk, indie rock
- Occupations: Vocalist, songwriter, musician
- Instruments: Guitar, vocals
- Years active: 1978–present
- Labels: BYO, Asian Man, Positive Force, Restless, Immortal/Sony, Rise, Birthday Money

Kevin Seconds is an American singer, songwriter and musician.

It was while living in Reno, that he founded the highly influential hardcore punk band 7 Seconds in 1979 with his younger brother Steve Youth.

== Straight edge ==
As with Ian MacKaye of Minor Threat, Seconds has had a great deal of influence on the straight edge subculture but has never fully embraced it as a movement. He has been outspoken about his opposition to the more militant aspects of straight edge and does not support it. Seconds continues to maintain a drug/alcohol/smoke-free lifestyle but appears to have no interest in being a spokesman for the straight edge lifestyle. He is vegetarian.

== Discography ==
- 1997 Stoudamire (Earth/Cargo)
- 2001 Heaven's Near Wherever You Are (Headhunter)
- 2002 Matt Skiba & Kevin Seconds (Split CD with Matt Skiba)
- 2008 Rise Up, Insomniacs! (Asian Man)
- 2010 Good Luck Buttons (Asian Man)
- 2012 Don't Let Me Lose Ya (Asian Man)
- 2014 Off Stockton (Rise)
- 2014 New Years Rulin's (This Means Something)
- 2016 Band-Aid On A Bullet Wound (Birthday Money)
