= SOB's =

Music venue and restaurant in Manhattan

Coordinates: 40°43′42.19″N 74°0′18.52″W

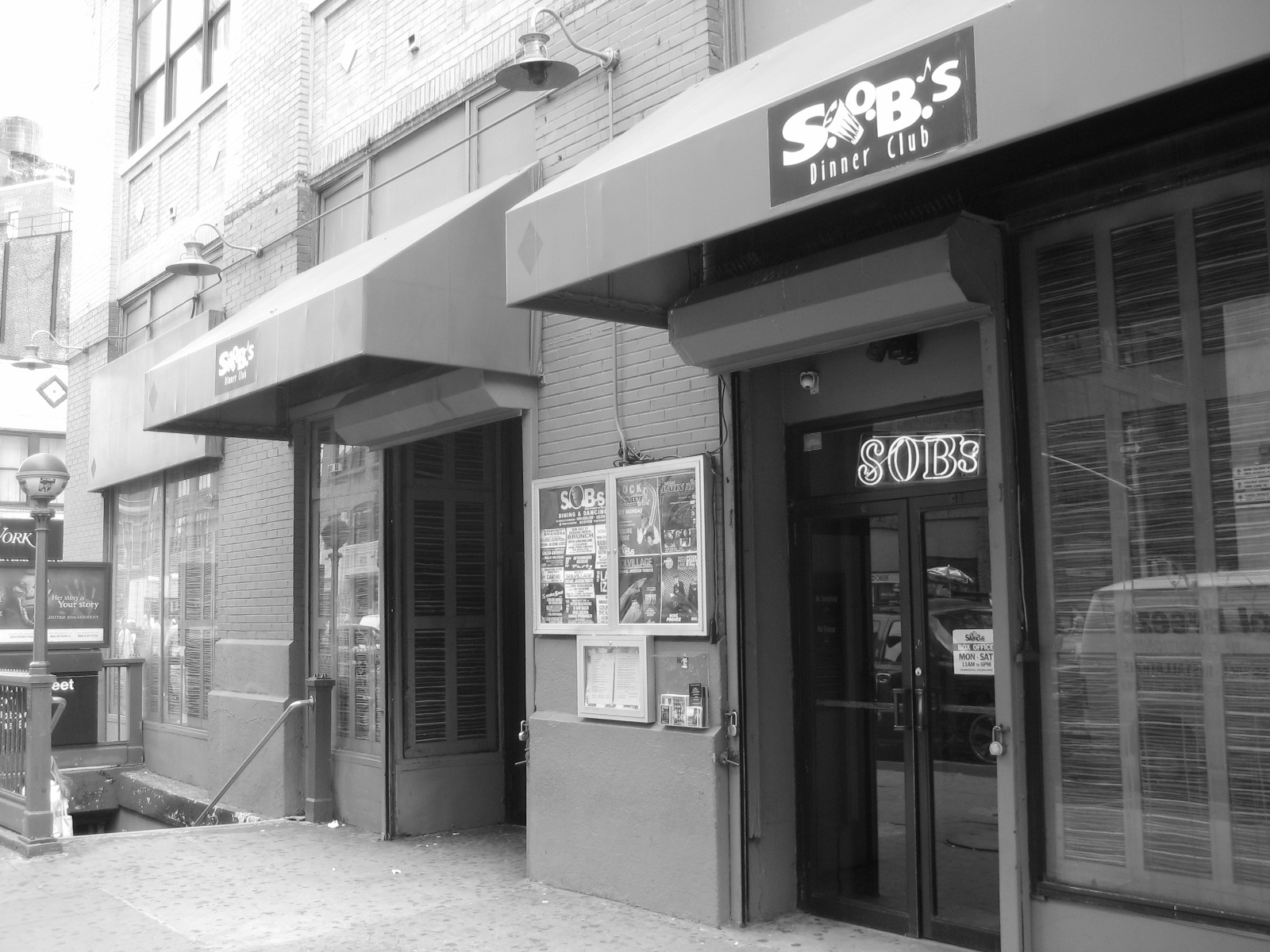
- SOB's exterior, by the subway entrance to Houston Street station.
- Interactive map of SOB's
- Address: 204 Varick Street
- Location: New York, NY 10014
- Owner: Larry Gold
- Seating type: Seating and Standing room
- Capacity: 350–400
- Type: Live music venue/Nightclub

Construction
- Opened: June 1982

Website
- http://sobs.com

SOB's is a live world music venue and restaurant in the Hudson Square neighborhood of Manhattan. S.O.B.’s is an abbreviation of Sounds of Brazil. Larry Gold opened SOB's in June 1982 with the purpose of exposing the music of the Afro-Latino diaspora to as many people as possible. It has a standing capacity of 450, and a seating capacity of 160. Gold remains the owner of the venue.

In its early days, SOB's existed on a barren stretch at the corner of Varick Street and Houston Street, just above the Houston Street subway station. The area, now known as Hudson Square, soon became trendy due to its proximity to the SoHo neighborhood. The venue's reputation began to grow with performances from Latin legends like Tito Puente, Marc Anthony, Celia Cruz and Eddie Palmieri. Brazilian artists including Seu Jorge, Jorge Ben, and Astrud Gilberto have performed at the venue, as well as more contemporary artists such as Isaac Delgado, Orquesta Aragon, Los Papines, Manolito Simonet, Septeto Nacional Ignacio Piñeiro, and Los Van Van.

== Notable past performers ==
- Afrika Bambaataa
- Alison Hinds
- Annabouboula
- Antibalas Afrobeat Orchestra
- Asher Roth
- Astrud Gilberto
- Aterciopelados
- Aventura
- Baaba Maal
- Babatunde Olatunji
- Bebe
- The Black Eyed Peas
- BLK JKS
- Bryson Tiller
- B.o.B
- Bootsy's Rubber Band
- Bounty Killer
- Buju Banton
- Bun B
- Café Tacvba
- Cardi B
- Cee-Lo Green
- Celia Cruz
- Chief Keef
- Chris Murray
- Collie Buddz
- Common
- Cypress Hill
- Dance Hall Crashers
- David Calzado
- De La Soul
- Desorden Público
- Digable Planets
- Dilated Peoples
- Dissidenten
- DJ Rekha
- DMX
- Dorothy Masuka
- Drake
- Eddie Palmieri
- Eek-A-Mouse
- El DeBarge
- El Gran Combo de Puerto Rico
- Eric Roberson
- Erykah Badu
- Estelle
- Fat Trel
- Fela Kuti
- Floetry
- Francisco Céspedes
- Frisner Augustin
- Fun
- Gil Scott Heron
- Gilberto Santa Rosa
- Grandmaster Flash
- Hugh Masekela
- Iann Dior
- Iggy Azalea
- Immortal Technique
- Inner Circle
- Issac Delgado
- J. Cole
- Jack Bruce
- Jadakiss
- James Taylor Quartet
- Jazmine Sullivan
- Joe Budden
- Joe Jackson
- John Legend
- Jon Bellion
- Jorge Ben Jor
- K.R.S. One
- Kanye West
- Keith Ape
- Kelis
- Kendrick Lamar
- Khalid
- Kid Cudi
- King Apparatus
- King Changó
- King Sunny Adé
- K'naan
- Laura Izibor
- Leela James
- Los Amigos Invisibles
- Los Fabulosos Cadillacs
- Los Van Van
- Lupe Fiasco
- MAX
- M.I.A.
- Maceo Parker
- Machel Montano
- Machine Gun Kelly
- Mad Professor
- Major Lazer
- Maná
- Marc Anthony
- Marsha Ambrosius
- Matthew Santos
- Mavado
- Melanie Fiona
- Mephiskapheles
- Meshell Ndegeocello
- Mike Posner
- Mobb Deep
- Mos Def
- Musiq Soulchild
- Mystikal
- Nas

Nana Vasconcelos

- Nina Sky
- Nneka
- Orishas
- OutKast
- Pete Rock
- Pharoahe Monch
- The Pietasters
- Poorstacy
- Post Malone
- Q-Tip
- Questlove
- Raekwon
- Raheem DeVaughn
- Rahzel
- Raphael Saddiq
- Ricardo Lemvo
- Rick Ross
- Ryan Leslie
- Sadat X
- Saves the Day
- The Scofflaws
- Sean Paul
- Septeto Nacional
- Serani
- Seun Kuti
- Shabba Ranks
- The Skatalites
- The Skunks
- The Slackers
- Slaughterhouse
- Spooky Black
- Spring Heeled Jack
- Stephen Marley
- Styles P
- Sun Ra
- Swizz Beatz
- SWV
- Talib Kweli
- Teedra Moses
- The-Dream
- The Roots
- Tito Puente
- The Toasters
- Toots and the Maytals
- T-Pain
- Travis Scott
- Usher
- Wale
- The Weathermen
- The Weeknd
- Yelawolf
- Zaïko Langa Langa
