= The Skunks (ska band) =

American third wave ska band

- Origin: Hyattsville, Maryland, United States
- Genres: Third wave ska Ska punk
- Years active: 1988–1997
- Labels: PU Records; Moon Ska Records
- Members: Tony Albano; George Beronio; Matt Earl; Anthony Foronda; Joe Hottel; Andy Hayleck; Jake Hughes; Tim Karns; Mike Kim; James McDonald; Erick Morgan; Steve Orders; David Reinstein; Rico Renzi; Ely Rodriguez; Reggie Romain; Dave Rudolph; Larry Schugam; Matt Simms; Dave Smallwood; Scott Treude; Brent Washburn

The Skunks were a third wave ska band formed in 1988 by a group of high school friends from suburban Maryland. They recorded three albums, performed extensively in the Washington, DC/Baltimore, Maryland area, and toured the United States.

== History ==
=== Founding ===
In August 1988, Matt Earl and James McDonald, who had been members of Boy Scout Troop 214 in University Park, Maryland, encountered Joe Hottel and Erick Morgan at a skateboarding hangout in Riverdale Park, Maryland. From this association, came the idea of starting The Skunks. Soon, the newly formed band, augmented by Anthony Foronda, Jake Hughes and Brent Washburn, began to play at events and parties in suburban Maryland. In December 1988, the Skunks performed their first paid show at DC Space in Washington. This was followed, in April 1989, by a show on the University of Maryland campus in College Park, Maryland, and in September, by a performance at the 9:30 Club. These were the first of their many appearances at these venues.

Soon, the increasing popularity of the Skunks led them to recruit Tony Albano, Andy Hayleck, Reggie Romain, Dave Rudolph, Dave Smallwood and Scott Treude. To enhance their appeal to commercial venues, the Skunks created a cassette, which was copyrighted on September 29, 1990, but never released. However, James Joyce, an archivist of underground music, singled out this tape as one of his "most prized recordings".

=== Chaos In Skaville ===
The demo tape was followed by a cassette, Chaos in Skaville. It was copyrighted on May 5, 1991, and released by PU Records, which was a company created by the Skunks. It also released a 7 inch vinyl single, "Piñata", in 1992. After these releases, the band's schedule became more active, with many shows in local venues and occasional performances on the road. In 1992, during an appearance at Hennessey's bar in Georgetown, the Skunks invited The Pietasters to perform with them. This was the first of many occasions when the two bands played together. They also shared a record label.

=== Moon Ska Records ===
Even before Chaos in Skaville, the Skunks had attracted the attention of Robert "Bucket" Hingley, who was recruiting for his label Moon Ska Records. To confirm his interest, Hingley invited them to go on tour with his band The Toasters. During the summer of 1992, The Skunks performed with Hingley's band, as well as several other ska acts, at the Masquerade in Atlanta, Georgia, Augusta, Georgia, Wilmington, North Carolina, Madison, Wisconsin, Milwaukee, Wisconsin, and Chicago, Illinois. The tour culminated, on February 27, 1993, with Moon Ska's Skalapalooza at The Ritz in New York City, where The Skunks appeared with The Toasters, Bad Manners, The Skatalites, The Scofflaws, and Ruder Than You. After the tour, the Skunks signed with Moon Ska and shortly thereafter, Chaos in Skaville appeared in Moon's catalog, where it was listed as MR034.

=== Mixed Nuts ===
During 1993, the Skunks, joined by new members George Beronio, Tim Karns and Mike Kim, continued to perform at home and on tour. In April, they participated, with The Pietasters, in the SkaOiAndPunk festival at the Masquerade. That summer, during their "Nuts on the Beach" tour, they performed at Dick's Clam and Cow in Virginia Beach, Virginia, as well as at several other locations in the Tidewater region of Virginia.

During breaks, the Skunks recorded tracks for a new album, Mixed Nuts. When it was almost ready, Joe Hottel decided to move to Atlanta. Consequently, on the final version, he was replaced by new vocalist, Steve Orders. However, lyrics on all tracks but one were written by Hottel.

At the Black Cat, the release of Mixed Nuts was celebrated on August 18, 1994, and in June 1995, it appeared in the Moon Ska catalog as MR040. Even before Moon's official release of Mixed Nuts, one of its tracks, "Big Haired Girls", appeared in the compilation Skarmageddon (Moon Ska 1994). Two more tracks are included in compilations: "Odd Couple" is on Cover to Cover [Ska] (Bob Media 1996), and "YMCA" is on Skandalous: I've Gotcha Covered, Vol. 2 (Shanachie Records 1997).

In 1994 and 1995, The Skunks continued to perform and tour. During a nationwide tour to California and back, they performed with Mustard Plug in Lawrence, Kansas, and St. Louis, Missouri.

=== No Apologies ===
In 1995, after Mixed Nuts was released, James McDonald left The Skunks to found a new band, Eastern Standard Time. As the Skunks began work on another album, Larry Schugam took over drums, Dave Reinstein replaced Dave Rudolph on trombone, and Rico Renzi took bass. During the summer of 1996, in anticipation of the new release, the Skunks toured Quebec and five U.S. states. This tour ended in New York City, where they appeared with Spring Heeled Jack. On August 24, 1996, the album No Apologies was released as Moon Ska MR079. One of its tracks, "Dubz 57 Sauce", was included on the Moon Ska produced soundtrack to the 1997 independent film, Bang. In the summer of 1997, the band broke up. In his review of No Apologies, Brian Ellis expressed his appreciation of The Skunks.

== Where are they now? ==
Erick Morgan, Dave Reinstein, Ely Rodriguez and Matt Simms joined Eastern Standard Time. Morgan also joined Lickity Split and the Pietasters, before forming The Spice Boyz with Chris Suspect. Morgan died of cardiac complications brought on by pneumonia on April 18, 2020.

Before joining The Toasters, Tim Karns played with the Checkered Cabs.

Joe Hottel lives in Decatur, Georgia, where he performs occasionally and plays soccer with the Oakhurst Rovers.

Steve Orders taught English at Earle B. Wood Middle School and Thomas Sprigg Wootton High School in Rockville, Maryland.

Scott Treude has played with several bands, including Fireworks Go Up!, while pursuing parallel careers as an environmental physicist and web programmer.

Dave Rudolph, Mike Kim and Ely Rodriguez now live in California.

Matt Earl, who left The Skunks to go to graduate school, is Associate Professor in the Department of Radiation Oncology at the University of Maryland, Baltimore, where he is director of the dosimetry training program. He works in the Tate Cancer Center at Baltimore Washington Medical Center.

Andy Hayleck has created "sound films", and other experimental music, which he has performed with the group Trockeneis. He serves on the faculty of Maryland Institute College of Art in Baltimore.

Rico Renzi is an artist. He is the original colorist and a co-creator of the version of Spider-Woman colloquially referred to as Spider-Gwen.

== Personnel ==
Name	Instrument	Dates	Chaos in Skaville	Mixed Nuts	No Apologies
Erick Morgan	Keyboards	Aug 1988 to Jun 1997	X	X	X
Matt Earl	Tenor Saxophone	Aug 1988 to Aug 1995	X	X	
James McDonald	Drums	Aug 1988 to Aug 1990; Sep 1991 to Nov 1995	X	X	X
Joe Hottel	Vocals	Aug 1988 to Aug 1993	X		
Brent Washburn	Clarinet	Sep 1988 to Jun 1997	X	X	X
Anthony Foronda	Alto Saxophone	Sep 1988 to Jan 1990			
Jake Hughes	Bass	Sep 1988 to Aug 1989			
Andy Hayleck	Guitar	Feb 1989 to Oct 1989; Nov 1993 to Jun 1997		X	X
Dave Rudolph	Trombone	Apr 1989 to Aug 1993	X	X	
Tony Albano	Trumpet	Jul 1989 to May 1991	X		
Scott Treude	Guitar	Sep 1989 to Feb 1992	X		
Dave Smallwood	Bass	Sep 1989 to Nov 1991	X		
Reggie Romain	Drums	Sep 1990 to Dec 1991	X		
George Beronio	Trumpet	Jun 1991 to Nov 1993		X	
Tim Karns	Bass	Nov 1991 to Jan 1997		X	X
Mike Kim	Guitar	Feb 1992 to Nov 1993		X	
Ely Rodriguez	Trumpet	Nov 1993 to Jun 1997		X	X
Steve Orders	Vocals	Nov 1993 to Jun 1997		X	X
Rico Renzi	Bass, Vocals	Jul 1994 to Jun 1997			X
Dave Reinstein	Trombone	Sep 1995 to Jun 1997			X
Matt Simms	Saxophone	Sep 1995 to Jun 1997			X
Larry Schugam	Drums	Nov 1995 to Jun 1997			X

Timeline
