= Inspecter 7 =

American ska band

- Origin: New Brunswick, New Jersey, United States
- Genres: Ska
- Years active: 1992-Present
- Members: Giuseppe Mancini; Daniella Cardoza; Jason Monaco; King Django; Vinny Troyani; Brian Varneke; Chris Holland; Matt Renzo; Jeff "Jeffe" Onorato; Matt Zacek

Inspecter 7 is an American ska band formed in 1992 in New Brunswick, New Jersey, with a sound that combines all three waves of ska (traditional, two-tone and third wave)

After releasing a seven-inch single on Moon Ska Records, and appearing on several compilation albums, including all three volumes of the Oi: Skampilation series, They released their first full-length album in 1997, The Infamous, which received positive reviews.

Over the years, they shared the stage with ska acts including The Scofflaws, The Specials, Mr. Symarip Roy Ellis, Bad Manners, The Mighty Mighty Bosstones, Mephiskapheles, The Skatalites, Fishbone, The Business, Men At Work, The Selecter, Social Decay, The Special Beat, Murphy's Law, General Public.

In 2013, they released their third full-length album, Escapes And Illusions, on Little Dickman Records.

Scorsese licensed One Step Beyond for use in The Wolf of Wall Street.

== Members ==
- Giuseppe Mancini - vocals
- Daniella Cardoza - vocals
- Jay Monaco - guitar
- Matt Zacek - bass
- Matt Renzo - drums
- King Django - keyboards
- Vinny Troyani - tenor saxophone
- Jeffery Onorato - tenor saxophone
- Brian Varneke - trumpet
- Chris Holland - trombone

== Former Members ==
- Rev Sinister – vocals
- Anton Major - trombone
- Adam X – everything
- "Animal" – drums
- Glen Miller – guitar
- Stephanie Landers – keyboards
- "Big John" Janos Czifra – alto saxophone
- Erik "Skooch" Schroeder – tenor saxophone
- Quincy "Ace" Bright – bass
- Joe McCarthy – drums
- Jeff Silverman – vocals
- Johnny Liu – trombone
- Jason "Sharky" Balsamello – trumpet
- Matt Pinder – baritone horn
- Imran Ansari – alto saxophone
- Scott Sullivan – bass
- Tim "Predator" Boyce – guitar
- Jay "Boxcar" Battle – drums
- Brian Onka – guitar
- Chris "Snapper" Jefferson – guitar
- Adrian Baglino – drums
- “Lord” Tedford Juachon – trombone
- Michael Fields – tenor saxophone
- Jenny Whiskey – tenor saxophone, vocals
- Rob George – guitar
- Reggae Bob – bass
- Pip – drums
- James Kelly – trombone
- Mike O'Connell - tenor saxophone
- Kurt Thum – keyboards
- Sally Homer – vocals
- Mikey Deeds - guitar
- Matt "The Cat" Lott - Tenor Saxophonist
- Matt Kappler - Guitarist
- Chris Fitzgerald - Tenor Saxophonist
- Benjamin Clapp - Trombone
- Mike Yak - Drums
- Skylar Stills - Trombone

== Discography ==
- "Cookin'" – Oi!/Skampilation, Vol. 1 (Various Artists) (Radical Records, September 11, 1995)
- "Agent 86" & "See Ya" – 7" single (Moon Ska Records, 1996)
- "Sharky 17" & "Popeye" – Oi!/Skampilation, Vol. 2 (Various Artists) (Radical Records, April 5, 1997)
- "Train Song" – Oi!/Skampilation, Vol. 3 (Various Artists) (Radical Records, September 8, 1997)
- The Infamous (Radical Records, September 9, 1997)
- "Boots and Suits" – The Skoidats and Inspecter 7; 7" split (Radical Records, 1998)
- "One Step Beyond" – House of Ska: A Tribute to Madness (Various Artists) (Cleopatra Records, May 18, 2000)
- Banished to Bogeyland (Radical Records, 1999)
- Escapes and Illusions (I7 Records, 2013)

== See also ==
- List of Moon Ska Records artists
- List of ska musicians
