= Dub 56 =

Studio album by the Toasters
- Released: August 23, 1994
- Genre: Ska
- Length: 42:47 (original); 130:23 (special edition)
- Label: Moon Ska
- Producer: Robert "Bucket" Hingley

The Toasters chronology
New York Fever (1992)	Dub 56 (1994)	Hard Band for Dead (1996)

Professional ratings
Review scores
Source	Rating
AllMusic	4.5/5 stars

Dub 56 is the fifth album released by the ska group the Toasters. It was released at a time in which ska punk was looking to break into the mainstream.

== Track listing ==
Dub 56 track listing
No.	Title	Length
1.	"Direction"	2:43
2.	"Freedom"	4:07
3.	"Mona"	3:05
4.	"Dancin'"	3:28
5.	"Dub 56"	2:45
6.	"Sweet Cherie"	3:52
7.	"Tunisia"	2:35
8.	"Little Hidden Secrets"	2:49
9.	"Marlboro Man"	2:50
10.	"Ain't Nuthin"	3:13
11.	"Razor Cut"	3:14
12.	"Legal Shot"	3:18
13.	"Midnight Hour"	2:32
14.	"Goody Goody"	2:18

=== Special edition ===
Disc 1
No.	Title	Length
1.	"Direction"	2:43
2.	"Freedom"	4:07
3.	"Mona"	3:05
4.	"Dancin'"	3:28
5.	"Dub 56"	2:45
6.	"Sweet Cherie"	3:52
7.	"Tunisia"	2:35
8.	"Little Hidden Secrets"	2:49
9.	"Marlboro Man"	2:50
10.	"Ain't Nuthin"	3:13
11.	"Razor Cut"	3:14
12.	"Legal Shot"	3:18
13.	"Midnight Hour"	2:32
14.	"Goody Goody"	2:18
15.	"Dub 56 (Chat Mix)"	2:48
16.	"Legal Shot (Dance Mix)"	6:59
17.	"Legal Shot (Gangster Mix)"	9:02
18.	"Ain't Nuthin' (Chorus Mix)"	3:14

Disc 2
No.	Title	Length
1.	"Matt Davis (Live in San Diego)"	3:37
2.	"Too Hip to Be Cool (Live in San Diego)"	3:14
3.	"Social Security (Live in San Diego)"	2:58
4.	"Mono (Live in San Diego)"	3:05
5.	"Thrill Me Up (Live in San Diego)"	3:46
8.	"Legal Shot (Live in San Diego)"	3:46
9.	"Go Girl (Live in San Diego)"	3:04
10.	"East Side Beat (Live in San Diego)"	5:24
11.	"Pool Shark (Live in San Diego)"	4:35
12.	"Weekend in L.A. (Live in LA)"	4:11
13.	"History Book (Live in LA)"	3:42
14.	"Decision At Midnight (Live in LA)"	3:52
15.	"Mona (Live in LA)"	3:05
16.	"Thrill Me Up (Live in LA)"	3:58
17.	"Legal Shot (Live in LA)"	3:28
18.	"Shebeen (Live in LA)"	4:12
19.	"East Side Beat (Live in LA)"	5:39
