= God Bless Satan =

Album by Mephiskapheles

Studio album by Mephiskapheles
- Released: 1994
- Genres: Ska; ska-core
- Length: 48:33
- Label: Moon Ska

Mephiskapheles chronology
God Bless Satan (1994)	Maximum Perversion (1997)

Professional ratings
Review scores
Source	Rating
Allmusic	4.5/5 stars

God Bless Satan is the debut album by ska band Mephiskapheles. It was released in 1994 on Moon Ska Records. The album has playful and satanic undertones.

== Track listing ==
1. "Mephiskapheles" – 4:57
2. "Satanic Debris" – 4:16
3. "Bad John" – 3:24
4. "Centre of the..." – 2:50
5. "Hard Times" – 3:24
6. "Doomsday" – 3:15
7. "Rank & File" – 2:05
8. "Eskamoes" – 4:01
9. "Saba" – 5:59
10. "The Ballad of Admiral Stockdale" – 2:40
11. "Danse Me Not" – 4:01
12. "Finnigan Froth" – 2:12
13. "The Bumble Bee Tuna Song" – 5:29
