= Static World View =

Studio album by Spring Heeled Jack
- Released: March 26, 1996
- Recorded: 1995
- Genre: Third-wave of ska
- Length: 55:39
- Label: Moon Ska Records
- Producer: Carl Osgood; Spring Heeled Jack

Spring Heeled Jack chronology
Connecticut Ska (1993)	Static World View (1996)	Songs from Suburbia (1998)

Professional ratings
Review scores
Source	Rating
AllMusic	3/5 stars

Static World View is the first album by Spring Heeled Jack, released by Moon Ska Records on March 26, 1996.

By the time the band began recording the album, original trumpet player Pat Gingras had left, replaced by Tyler Jones. Saxophone player James Riley left midway through. As a result, half was recorded with replacement Pete Wasilewski, who previously played with trombone player Chris Rhodes in the Connecticut band JC Superska. Static World View begins and ends with quotes from the movie Tapeheads.

To support the album, the band filmed their first music video for "Pay Some Dues" and started touring outside of their usual local territory.

== Track listing ==
1. "One Way" (Karcich) – 2:42
2. "Electric" – 3:29
3. "Pay Some Dues" (Ragona) – 2:54
4. "Running Man (Lookin' Thru the Mirror)" (Ragona) – 3:36
5. "Rufus Shakeedoo" (Rhodes) – 3:32
6. "All My Own" (Ragona, Pellegrino, Rhodes) – 2:56
7. "Pigeon-Holed" (Ragona, Karcich, Pellegrino) – 2:47
8. "Freedom" (Karcich, Spring Heeled Jack) – 3:54
9. "Addicted" (Ragona, Pellegrino,) – 3:35
10. "Peg Leg Bates" (Rhodes) – 3:25
11. "Nervous" (Ragona, Karcich) – 3:23
12. "Alicia Silverstone" (Aerosmith) – 0:35
13. "Big Stone Cowboy" (Jones, Pellegrino, Rhodes) – 2:16
14. "This Song (Has Probably Been Played Before)" (Ragona, Pellegrino, Omonte) – 19:55

* The final track ends at minute 4:18. After fifteen minutes and thirty seconds of silence, drummer Dave Karcich states "You fast forwarded a half an hour for nothing. How do you feel?".

== Personnel ==
- Tyler Jones - trumpet
- Dave Karcich - drums, backing vocals
- Rick Omonte - bass
- Mike Pellegrino - guitar, vocals
- Ron Ragona - guitar, vocals
- Chris Rhodes - trombone, arranger, vocals
- James Riley - sax (alto & tenor)
- Pete Wasilewski - sax (tenor)
- Ed Goldberg - engineer
- Basil Grabovsky - engineer, mastering, mixing
- Carl Osgood - producer, engineer, mastering, mixing
- Jeremy Brazeal - artwork
