= Enemy of the System =

Studio album by the Toasters
- Released: 2002
- Genre: Ska
- Length: 46:30
- Label: Asian Man; Moon Ska Brasil; Moon Ska Europe
- Producer: Robert "Bucket" Hingley

The Toasters chronology
Don't Let the Bastards Grind You Down (1997)	Enemy of the System (2002)	One More Bullet (2007)

Enemy of the System is a studio album by the ska band the Toasters, released in 2002. The album was the first Toasters release on Asian Man Records; their long standing label Moon Ska Records became defunct in 2000. It was released 5 years after Don't Let the Bastards Grind You Down, due to the demise of ska label Moon Ska and, also, the decrease of third wave ska's mainstream popularity that saw the disappearance of a lot of ska bands some years before. The band supported the album with a North American tour. "Dog Eat Dog" is about the music business and the band's label struggles.

== Critical reception ==
Professional ratings
Review scores
Source	Rating
AllMusic	4/5 stars

Exclaim! noted that "there is nothing new here; the music is poppy ska mixed with rock, blasting horns and Bucket's trademarked vocals." Trouser Press opined that "the music is consistently upbeat, but the playing is even more restrained and predictable than it was on Don't Let the Bastards Grind You Down. The Chicago Tribune called the album "infectious old-school ska so tuneful and danceable it blows most of today's ska-punk urchins right off their skateboards."

AllMusic wrote that "their first studio album in five years shows blessedly little in the way of artistic maturation; it's chock-full of the same old straight-up, R&B-influenced ska that the band has been playing since the early '80s."

== Track listing ==
1. "Skafinger" – 2:44
2. "Enemy of the System" – 3:03
3. "Dog Eat Dog" – 4:19
4. "Pirate Radio" – 3:52
5. "Sweet Home Town Jamaica" – 4:12
6. "Sitting on the Top of the World" – 3:07
7. "Modern World America" – 2:44
8. "Why, Oh, Why?" – 4:23
9. "Pendulum" – 3:04
10. "Can I Get Another?" – 2:41
11. "Barney" – 3:29
12. "If You Loved Me" – 2:49
13. "Road to Rio" – 2:53
14. "Social Security" – 3:04
