= One More Bullet =

Studio album by the Toasters
- Released: 2007
- Genre: Ska
- Length: 46:30
- Label: Stomp; Moon Ska Brasil; Moon Ska Europe
- Producer: Robert "Bucket" Hingley

The Toasters chronology
Enemy of the System (2002)	One More Bullet (2007)

Professional ratings
Review scores
Source	Rating
AllMusic	3.5/5 stars

One More Bullet is the ninth studio album from the ska band the Toasters. Released in 2007, the album was the first Toasters release on Stomp Records. It was their second album not to be released on Moon Ska Records (excluding early records), as that label became defunct in 2000.

== Track listing ==
1. "What a Gwan" – 3:50
2. "Night Train to Moscow" – 2:23
3. "Where's the Freedom" – 2:36
4. "Life In a Bubble" – 3:23
5. "Run Rudy Run Redux" – 4:39
6. "You're Gonna Pay" – 2:57
7. "Bits and Pieces" – 1:51
8. "When Will I Be Loved" – 2:44
9. "One More Bullet" – 3:30
10. "Step Up (instrumental)" – 2:44
11. "El Chopo" – 3:59
12. "Blues Bros Outro" – 1:33
