= Don't Let the Bastards Grind You Down =

Studio album by the Toasters
- Released: 1997
- Genre: Ska
- Length: 57:58
- Label: Moon Ska
- Producer: Robert "Bucket" Hingley

The Toasters chronology
| Hard Band for Dead (1996) | Don't Let the Bastards Grind You Down (1997) | Enemy of the System (2002) |

Professional ratings
Review scores
| Source | Rating |
|---|---|
| AllMusic | 4.5/5 stars |

Don't Let the Bastards Grind You Down is the seventh studio album by the Toasters. The album's cover includes the supposed-Latin motto, "Illegitimis non carborundum", which is supposed to mean "one must not be ground down by the bastards", although it is largely faux-Latin, with "carborundum" (intended to look like a Latin gerundive) actually referring to silicon carbide, a type of abrasive.

== Track listing ==
Don't Let the Bastards Grind You Down track listing
| No. | Title | Writer(s) | Length |
|---|---|---|---|
| 1. | "Don't Let the Bastards Grind You Down" | Rob Hingley | 2:51 |
| 2. | "Fire in My Soul" | Lindo | 3:54 |
| 3. | "I'm Running Right Through the World" | Rob Hingley | 3:50 |
| 4. | "Underground Town" | David Waldo | 3:28 |
| 5. | "Gimmie Some Lovin'" | Spencer Davis, Muff Winwood, Steve Winwood | 2:34 |
| 6. | "Devil and a .45" | Rob Hingley | 3:36 |
| 7. | "Daddy Cry" | Rob Hingley, Matt Malles | 3:17 |
| 8. | "Today's a Good Day" | Johnathan McCain | 3:15 |
| 9. | "Jackie Chan" | Rick Faulkner | 3:59 |
| 10. | "Rude, Rude Baby" | Sledge | 2:28 |
| 11. | "Everything You Said Has Been a Lie" | Rob Hingley | 2:23 |
| 12. | "Spooky Graveyard" | Dave Barry, Rob Hingley | 4:01 |
| 13. | "Big Red" | Fred Reiter | 4:06 |
| 14. | "Bye, Bye, Baby" | Hingley, Nobile | 4:40 |
| 15. | "Weekend in L.A." | Sean Dinsmore, Rob Hingley | 4:15 |
| 16. | "Woyay" | Lindo, Malles | 3:11 |
| 17. | "Rhythm and Pain" | Dave Barry | 1:53 |

== Personnel ==
- Dave Barry – keyboards
- George Evageliou – engineer
- Rick Faulkner – trombone
- Rob "Bucket" Hingley – guitar, vocals
- Jafo – design, illustrations
- Joe Johnson – assistant engineer
- Matt Malles – bass
- MC Schneeberger – producer, mixing
- John McCain – drums, vocals
- Mento Buru – backing vocals
- Allissa Myhowac – assistant engineer
- Aaron Owens – guitar
- Mike Reddy – illustrations, cover design
- Fred Reiter – saxophone
- Dale Rio – photography
- Jack Ruby, Jr. – vocals
- Sledge – trumpet, vocals
- Larry "Ace" Snell – drums
- David Waldo – keyboards

== Charts ==
Chart performance for Don't Let the Bastards Grind You Down
| Chart (1997) | Peak position |
|---|---|
| US Reggae Albums (Billboard) | 8 |
