= New York Fever (album) =

Studio album by the Toasters
- Released: 1992
- Genre: Ska
- Length: 45:10
- Label: Moon

The Toasters chronology
This Gun for Hire (1990)	New York Fever (1992)	Dub 56 (1994)

New York Fever is an album by the American band the Toasters, released in 1992. The band supported the album with a North American tour.

== Production ==
The album was mixed by Joe Jackson, under the alias "Stanley Turpentine".

== Critical reception ==
Professional ratings
Review scores
Source	Rating
AllMusic	4/5 stars

Trouser Press wrote that the album "gets off to a tremendous start with the tight, energetic title track and the swaggering groove and social commentary of 'Ploughshares into Guns' ... After that one-two punch, though, tight musicianship takes the place of solid songwriting." The Kitchener-Waterloo Record opined that "the production on this album is superb, with the bass runs punctuating rather than rolling." The Arizona Daily Star called the album "funny, fun and insightful," writing that it "incorporates elements of funk, township jive, calypso and dance-hall music."

AllMusic noted that "the songwriting could be a bit more polished and melodic in places instead of relying on the group's admittedly fine instrumental work."

== Track listing ==
1. "New York Fever" - 2:08
2. "Ploughshares into Guns" - 3:29
3. "History Book Version" - 2:57
4. "Too Hip to Be Cool" - 3:35
5. "Night Train" - 4:30
6. "Social Security" - 2:55
7. "Shebeen" - 4:05
8. "Johnny, Forsake Her" - 3:58
9. "Too Much Happening" - 2:54
10. "Pool Shark (Reprise)" - 3:15
11. "B27" - 3:47
12. "Ploughshares Version" - 3:30
13. "Pablo's Shebeen" - 4:15
