= The Adjusters =

American ska, soul and reggae band

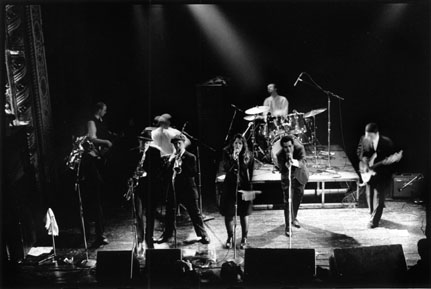
- Live at the Metro in Chicago, 1997

Background information
- Origin: Chicago, Illinois, United States
- Genres: Ska
- Years active: 1995–2003
- Labels: Jump Up! Records, Moon Ska Records, Grover Records

The Adjusters were an American ska, soul and reggae band from Chicago, Illinois, United States, active from 1995 to 2003.

The band was known for its fusion of 1960s soul sounds with traditional ska and reggae as well as its progressive political views.

== History ==
Formed in 1995 at the University of Chicago, the Adjusters first gained notoriety within the university community before releasing their first album on Chicago-based Jump Up! Records in 1997. The band was notable both for bringing a political message into their music as well as incorporating soul music into the predominantly ska-punk sounds of the midwest ska scene at the time.

The Adjusters played many shows during this period (1997–1998) throughout the midwest and east coast, most numerously with Detroit-based ska-jazz band The Articles and NYC-based The Slackers. The Adjusters' second album "Before The Revolution" was released on Moon Ska Records in 1998, produced by Victor Rice, with a foreword by author Thomas Frank, and several tracks mixed by Jon Langford of the Mekons.

After the dissolution of Moon Records in 2000, the Adjusters' third album "Otis Redding Will Save America" was released on German label Grover Records in 2003. This album was also produced by Victor Rice and the single "Can't See the Light" features German ska and dancehall artist Dr. Ring-Ding.

The band has been inactive since 2003. Drummer/producer Rench went on to front bluegrass-hip hop act Gangstagrass.

== Band members ==
Daraka Kenric - Vocals
Joan Axthelm – Vocals
Jessica Basta - Vocals
Matt Parker - Organ (formerly of The Donkey Show)
Jason Packer - Guitar
Julien Headley – Drums
Josh Thurston-Milgrom – Bass
Nick Dempsey – Saxophone
Raphael Leib – Trumpet
Tom Howe – Trombone
Rench - Drums, Production

== Discography ==
Studio albums
The Politics of Style - 1997, Jump Up! Records
Before the Revolution - 1998, Moon Ska Records
Otis Redding Will Save America - 2003, Grover Records

Singles
"Michael Manley" (7") - 1996, Rosa Luxemburg Records
"Rebel Jam" (7") - 1998, Black Pearl Records

Collections
Stormwarning - 2002, Grover Records
