= Skaboom =

Skaboom!

Studio album by The Toasters
- Released: Original: 1987; CD: June 20, 1995
- Genre: Ska
- Length: 37:14; 63:54 (Re-release)
- Label: Celluloid (original); Moon Ska Records (1995 re-release); Megalith Records (2003 re-release)

The Toasters chronology
| Skaboom! (1987) | Thrill Me Up (1988) |

Professional ratings
Review scores
| Source | Rating |
|---|---|
| Allmusic | link |

Skaboom! is an album released by The Toasters originally in 1987 and re-released on a CD in June of 1995. The 1995 released featured an additional eight bonus tracks. The album is often stated as being the origin of modern, or "third-wave" ska in the United States.

== Track listing ==
1. "Talk Is Cheap" -3:50
2. "Pool Shark" -3:47
3. "Weekend in L.A." -4:22
4. "Shocker!" -4:31
5. "Toast on the Coast" -2:11
6. "Manipulator" -3:30
7. "Mr. Trouble" -3:24
8. "ABC's" 2:54
9. "East Side Beat" -3:45
10. "Now or Never" -3:19
11. "So Long, Buck" -1:16

Reissue Bonus Tracks

12. "Renee" -4:07
13. "Matt Davis" -2:45
14. "Ideal Man" -3:22
15. "Naked City" -3:14
  - Tracks 12–15 from the 1987 UK-only album release Pool Shark
16. "Recrimination" -3:15
17. "Razor Cut" -3:37
18. "Run Rudy Run" -4:14
19. "Radiation Skank" -2:07
  - Tracks 16–19 from the EP Recriminiations, recorded May 1985 & Produced by Joe Jackson (aka Stanley Turpentine)

Megalith Records re-release of Skaboom!.
