= Hard Band for Dead =

Studio album by the Toasters
- Released: 1996
- Genre: Ska
- Length: 40:32
- Label: Moon Ska
- Producer: Robert "Bucket" Hingley

The Toasters chronology
Dub 56 (1994)	Hard Band for Dead (1996)	Don't Let the Bastards Grind You Down (1997)

Hard Band for Dead is the sixth studio album by the Toasters.

== Critical reception ==
Professional ratings
Review scores
Source	Rating
AllMusic	3/5 stars

Jo-Ann Greene of AllMusic praised Hard Band for Dead for being a good example of third wave ska while honoring music that came before the Toasters.

== Track listing ==
1. "2-Tone Army" – 3:19
2. "Talk Is Cheap" – 3:11
3. "Friends" – 2:56
4. "Secret Agent Man" – 2:40
5. "Chuck Berry" – 2:38
6. "Mouse" – 3:44
7. "Hard Man Fe Dead" – 3:05
8. "Don't Come Running" – 3:13
9. "Properly" – 2:44
10. "Maxwell Smart" – 1:58
11. "I Wasn't Going to Call You Anyway" – 3:01
12. "Speak Your Mind" – 3:11
13. "Skaternity" – 2:41
14. "Dave Goes Crazy" – 2:07

== Charts ==
Chart performance for Hard Band for Dead
Chart (1996)	Peak position
US Reggae Albums (Billboard)	12
