= Thrill Me Up =

Studio album by The Toasters
- Released: 1988; CD: January 1, 1996
- Genre: Ska
- Length: 46:38
- Label: Skaloid (original); Moon Ska Records (1996 re-release)

The Toasters chronology
Skaboom (1987)	Thrill Me Up (1988)	This Gun for Hire (1990)

Professional ratings
Review scores
Source	Rating
Allmusic	1988: link 1996: link

Thrill Me Up was the second full-length album by The Toasters. The album was written by Robert "Bucket" Hingley and Cavo Dinsmore. The album was not as successful as their first album, Skaboom.

Thrill Me Up was originally made in 1988, but in 1996 The Toasters re-released it on the Celluloid record label. Celluloid folded shortly after the release, but Rob Hingly reissued the album on his own record label, Moon Ska Records.

== Track listing ==
1. Go Girl 3:26
2. Don't Blame Me 3:31
3. Haitian Frustration 3:46
4. Decision at Midnight 3:39
5. Frankenska 2:50
6. Thrill Me Up 3:03
7. Ska Killers 3:08
8. Johnny Go Ska 3:02
9. Keep on Going 3:21
10. Rhapsody in Bluebeat 1:57
11. Haitian Frustration 3:49
12. Brixton Beat 3:23
13. The Beat 4:16
14. No Respect 3:26

_{Tracks 11-14 were not included on the original 1988 release}
