= The Skoidats =

- Origin: Helena, Montana, U.S.
- Genres: Ska, Oi!, jazz, punk rock
- Years active: 1995–1997
- Past members: Gardner Dunn; John Chapman; Josh Grenz; Chuck Fuller; Justin Dillavou

The Skoidats were an American band that played music combining elements of ska, Oi!, jazz, and punk rock.

== History ==
The Skoidats formed in the summer of 1995 in Helena, Montana, and soon after their inception, they relocated to Missoula, Montana, losing two members. After arriving in Missoula, the two remaining original members recruited a drummer, two members of the University of Montana marching band, and a third horn player who had relocated from Helena. The band toured the country four times, and performed with bands such as The Slackers, MU330, Mephiskapheles, The Scofflaws, Let's Go Bowling and The Skatalites.

== Personnel ==
The line-up from the fall of 1995 to the spring of 1997 consisted of Gardner Dunn (drums), John Chapman (saxophone, vocals), Josh Grenz (saxophone), Chuck Fuller (bass) and Justin Dillavou (lead vocals, guitar). The formation on their second album consisted of Gardner Dunn (drums), John Chapman (saxophone, vocals), Chuck Fuller (bass) and Justin Dillavou (lead vocals, guitar).

== Discography ==
- The Times (1997)
- The Skoidats / Inspecter 7 – Boots And Suits (1998)
- A Cure For What Ales You (1999)
