= This Gun for Hire (album) =

Studio album by the Toasters
- Released: 1990; 1996 (CD)
- Genre: Ska
- Length: 38:22
- Label: Moon Ska
- Producer: Robert "Bucket" Hingley, Matt Malles

The Toasters chronology
Thrill Me Up (1988)	This Gun for Hire (1990)	New York Fever (1992)

This Gun for Hire is the third album by the American band the Toasters. It was released in 1990. The band supported the album with a North American tour.

The album was produced by bandmembers Robert "Bucket" Hingley and Matt Malles.

== Critical reception ==
Professional ratings
Review scores
Source	Rating
AllMusic	3/5 stars
Chicago Tribune	3/4 stars

The Chicago Tribune wrote that "for the most part this solid New York City band has decided to rework ska ... blending more mainstream and mellow pop sounds and sensibilities with ska to create an entertaining variant that would seem to have a lot of pop-crossover potential." The Ottawa Citizen noted that "elements of reggae, hip hop, Motown and jazz squeeze into the band's stylistic ska mix of between-the-beat guitar chords, trombones and dime-store organ sounds."

== Track listing ==
1. "Worry" - 3:40
2. "Havana (This Gun for Hire)" - 3:03
3. "One-Track Mind " - 3:42
4. "Paralyzed" - 4:16
5. "Don't Say Forever" - 3:37
6. "Choose" - 3:11
7. "Lies" - 3:48
8. "Roseanne" - 4:04
9. "East Side Beat" (Live Version) - 6:10
10. "T-Time" - 2:51
