= Smitz =

American punk/ska band from Hawaii

SMITZ
- Origin: Honolulu, Hawaii
- Genres: Ska, punk
- Years active: 2005–present
- Label: Audio Bento Records
- Members: Jonny Random; Timmy Corker; Rob West; Nic Sticcs
- Past members: Brennen Widget; Andy Creeper; David Garvin; Kalani Punani; Taylor Rice

SMITZ is a ska and punk rock band from Honolulu, Hawaii. The group was formed in the Summer of 2005 in the heart of Enchanted Lakes in Kailua. Members of SMITZ include Jonny Random (vocals, rhythm), David Garvin (lead guitar), Taylor Rice (bass), and Nic Sticcs (drums).

Within the next couple years SMITZ started making a name for themselves playing different venues such as Coffee Talk, Anna Banana's, Pink Cadillac, 1739 (Galaxy's), Haleiwa Gym, Waikiki Beach, Detox, Waikiki Sandbox and more. In late 2005, the band took to the studio to record their first album "Burning In". Recording with Demitri Marmash of Buckshot Shorty & Upstanding Youth. The album never saw the light of day because it eventually became unsatisfactory for the group. In 2008, the group decided to re-record "Burning In", but instead title it "Cretin Crossover". On August 7, 2012, their first official album was released.

SMITZ is still active and residing in Honolulu, Hawaii. They have shared the stage with bands such as Leftöver Crack, Face to Face (punk band), Voodoo Glow Skulls, T.S.O.L., Mephiskapheles and MDC (band).

They released their second album, "Skullduggerous," on October 13, 2017.

== Discography ==
=== Studio albums ===
- Cretin Crossover (2012) (Audio Bento Records)
- Skullduggerous (2017) (Audio Bento Records)

=== Compilations ===
- Hawaiian Punk: Volume 3 (Hawaiian Express Records)
