= Ruder Than You =

American ska band

- Origin: Philadelphia, Pennsylvania, United States
- Genres: Ska, Reggae
- Years active: 1989–present
- Members: Freddie Weaver - Vocals & Toasting; Doug Dubrosky - Vocals & Tenor Sax; Larry "Ace" Snell - Drums; Don Pancoe - Bass; Rod Martino - Guitar; Chris Klimchak - Trombone
- Past members: Dave Schneck - Vocals & Trombone; Ted McCloskey - Guitar & Vocals; Greg Fain - Guitar; Jenny Going - Trombone; Neal Petti - Guitar; John Wear - Guitar; Lou Fuiano - Baritone Sax; Joe McElhiney - Trumpet; John Woodman - Drums; Trish Johnson - Baritone Sax

Ruder Than You is an American ska band that was founded in 1989 at Penn State University, and relocated to Philadelphia in 1991. While ska and reggae stylings have always provided the common musical thread, over the past 15 plus years Ruder Than You has been mixing in dancehall, hip hop, rocksteady, and rub-a-dub – even adding elements of funk, jazz, and punk.

In 1992, Moon Records, officially MoonSKA NYC, put out their debut album, Big Step, and its follow-up Horny for Ska in 1996. By the mid 1990s the group had morphed from a five-piece into a nine-piece outfit and captured a loyal following in the Philadelphia and New York City areas. The group toured nationally, regularly opening up for groups like the Skatalites, Steel Pulse, Mighty Mighty Bosstones, Desmond Dekker, Ziggy Marley, Special Beat, Bad Manners, Fishbone, Yellowman, Eek a Mouse, and No Doubt. Ruder Than You CDs were internationally released in Japan and England, and songs can be found on dozens of ska compilations around the globe.

With Moon Records defunct, the band released their long-awaited third album, Philly Stylee, on their own God’s Ghetto Records label. The album features Trish Johnson on bari-sax and several top Philadelphia guest musicians including jazz trumpeter, John Swana. Philly Stylee was recorded in spurts during the Third-wave ska trend between 1996 and 1999 with final vocal overdubs and mixes completed in 2004. Philly Stylee's lengthy production was due to many factors affecting the band. This included the demise of the band’s former label Moon Records, a 3-year incarceration of lead singer and toaster Freddie "3D" Weaver, and the death of bari-sax player Trish Johnson, who was killed in the morning while traveling to Shenandoah, PA, to visit her mother. Despite these obstacles, after taking a nearly 3-year hiatus, the band began rehearsals again in 2003 and completed the CD.

The band’s latest release, and first truly fresh studio endeavor of the decade, is the 5-song EP entitled God’s Ghetto (2008). The EP is released on the East-African record label Lulu Nyeusi and represents the first known American ska-influenced music release on an African record label. Ruder Than You has always had an eclectic sound and this release is no exception. For this installment, the band chose tunes heavy on old school hip-hop and dancehall and emphasized lyrics penned by Weaver. While these songs differ a bit from the familiar feel of previous albums, they offer the same extraordinary energy and catchiness.

The band’s current roster of veteran members includes the Round Mound of Dub Sound - singer Freddie Weaver. Band leader Doug Dubrosky still sings and plays tenor sax. He and Don Pancoe on bass hail from the earliest days of RTY. Rod Martino and Chris Klimchak fill out the lineup on guitar and trombone, respectively. Larry "Ace" Snell of The Toasters and Public Service sits on the drum throne.

== Discography ==
- Big Step - Moon Records - 1992
- Horny For Ska - Moon Records - 1996
- Philly Stylee - God’s Ghetto Records - 2005
- God's Ghetto EP - Lulu Nyeusi Records, Tanzania - 2008
- Creation Sounds - God's Ghetto Records - 2009

== Compilations ==
- The Shack - 1993 Dojo Limited/BIB Records, contains the song "Get Some Peace" .
- United Colors of SKA - 1993 Pork Pie Records, contains the song "I Want Justice".
- Ska The Third Wave - 1995 Continuum Records, contains the song "Swallow Blood".
- Ska The Third Wave Volume II - 1996 Shanachie Records, contains live versions of the songs "Misskaculation" and "Paranoid".
- Rude Vibes: The Ultimate Collection of New Skool Ska - 1996 Do The Dog Music, contains the song "Uncle Albert".
- SKAndalous: I’ve Gotcha Covered - 1996 Shanachie Records, contains Ruder Than You’s version of Black Sabbath’s "Paranoid".
- Oi-Skampilation Volume II - 1996 Radical Records, contains the song "I Want Justice".
- SKA: Cover it Up - 1997 Beloved Records, contains live versions of "Misskaculation" and "Paranoid".
- Deamons - 1997 Skully Enterprises, contains a live version of "Future Girl".
- SKAndalous: I’ve Gotcha Covered - Volume II - 1997 Shanachie Records, features Ruder Than You’s version of The Beatles’ "Tax Man".
- SKA: The Instrumentals - 1997 Beloved Records, contains the song "Swatara".
- Freedom Sounds: A Tribute to the Skatalites - 1997 Shanachie Records, contains Ruder Than You’s Version of "El Pussycat".
- Dancin’ Mood - 1997 Triple Crown Records, contains a live version of "Uncle Albert".
