= Kingston Rudieska =

South Korean ska band

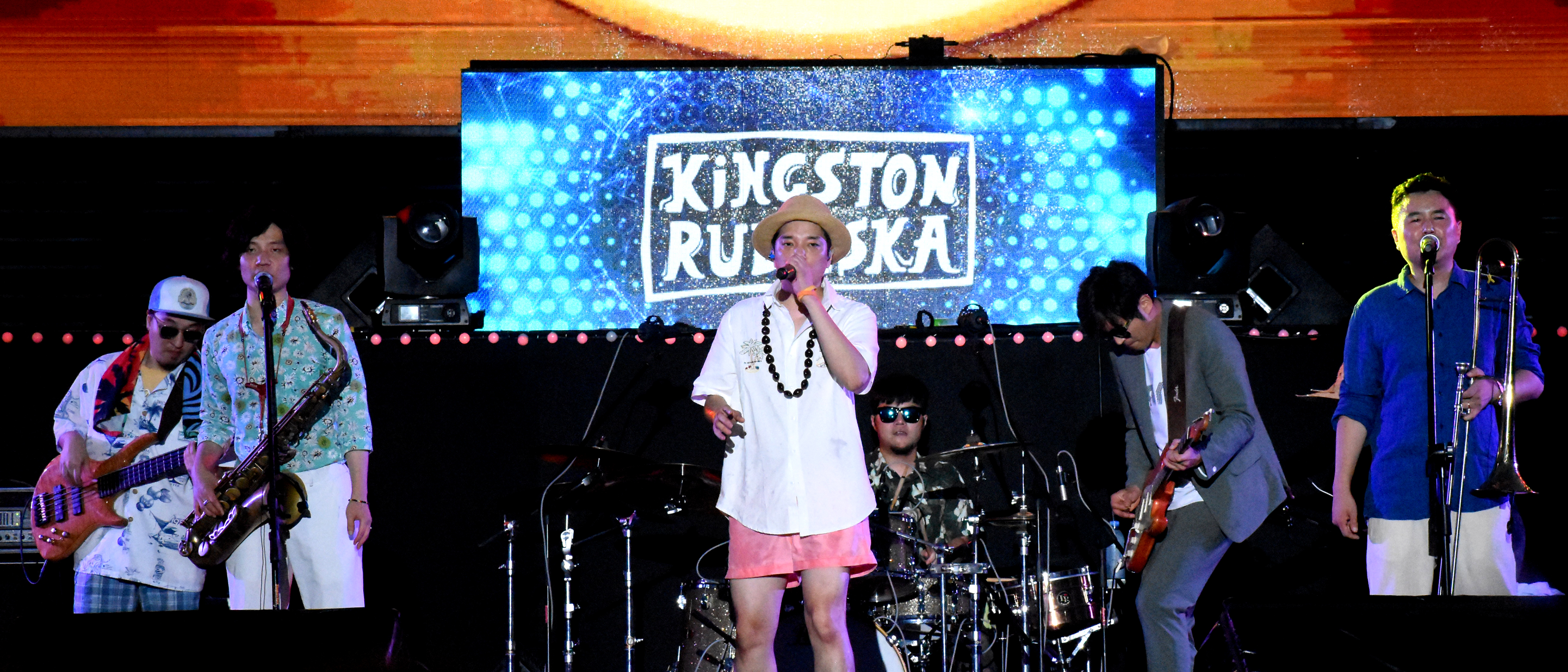
- Kingston Rudieska at the Busan Sea Festival, August 2018

Background information
- Origin: Seoul, South Korea
- Genres: Ska, ska jazz
- Years active: 2004–present
- Label: Eastern Standard Sounds
- Members: Choi Chul-wook (trombone); Lee Suk-Yul (lead vocals, congo, percussion); Oh Jeong-Seok (trumpet, flugelhorn); Kim Jeong-Kun (trumpet); Sung NockWon (tenor sax); Seo Jae-Ha (guitar); Son Hyong-Sik (bass); Kim Dae-min (drums); Yim Chae-Sun (keyboards)

Kingston Rudieska (킹스턴 루디스카) is a nine-piece South Korean ska band formed in 2004. Their sound is mainly influenced by first-wave Jamaican ska, as well as other Caribbean genres including reggae and calypso music. They are heavily influenced by the Skatalites and frequently perform Skatalites covers. Many of the members are jazz musicians, and their sound is heavily influenced by ska jazz, with band members frequently performing solos during performances.

With a high-energy style and a large backing band, Kingston Rudieska has gathered popularity around Korea, touring the country heavily and playing for most of the major music festivals including Jisan Valley Rock Festival, Pentaport Rock Festival, and Busan Rock Festival. They have had fewer chances to travel abroad due to their large roster, but they appeared at the Philippine Ska Festival in 2012. They have opened for such international acts as Chris Murray, The Slackers, Tokyo Ska Paradise Orchestra, and Dr. Ring-Ding.

They have collaborated with famous Korean musicians including Bobby Kim, YB, and Sim Soo-bong. They have appeared on numerous Korean television programs and become well known around Korea. They also appeared on a tribute compilation covering a song by Sanulrim.

== Founding ==
Trombonist Choi put together Kingston Rudieska after responding to a post on an Internet bulletin board looking for musicians for a "Jamaican" sounding band. Many of the original members had previously played in punk bands, including Choi who was the lead guitarist for the punk band Seagull (갈매기) and vocalist Suk-yul who was the bassist in Half Brothers (배다른형제) and Beef Jarky. The early lineup also featured Kim Insoo of Crying Nut on the keyboard. Their first concert was at the legendary punk club Skunk Hell.

== Seoul Riddim Superclub ==
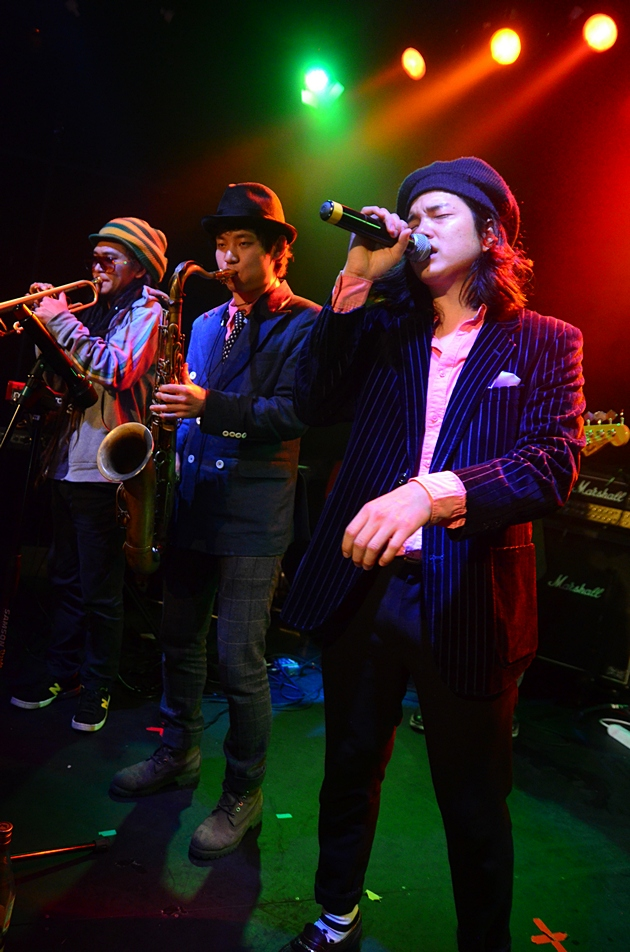
Kingston Rudieska at Rise Again Festival in Prism Hall, 29 December 2013

More recently, six members of Kingston Rudieska teamed up with members of Purijah, Rude Paper, and Jah Mai Band to form Seoul Riddim Superclub, a Korean reggae supergroup. The group formed after three members of Kingston Rudieska went to Japan to see Jimmy Cliff. During their stay, they joined with Japanese ska band The Eskargot Miles to perform at an "Asia United" show. Afterward, they were encouraged to start the band.

== Critical response ==
Kingston Rudieska are widely accepted as the leading ska band in Korea. They are noted for their mainly Korean language lyrics which help to give the group a uniquely Korean sound.

== Yumi’s Cells ==
The band makes an appearance in the first episode of season 2 of the popular TV series Yumi’s Cells (2021-2). Yumi (Kim Go-eun) has a new love interest, Ba-bi (Jinyoung), who takes her to an outdoor performance by the band on what is effectively their first date.

== International collaboration ==
They first got their name out by appearing on the United Colors of Ska compilation put out by German label Pork Pie. The song got the attention of German reggae/dancehall singer Dr. Ring-Ding who visited Korea in August 2013 to perform with his band Dr. Ring Ding Ska-Vaganza and record an EP with Kingston Rudieska.

Their 2014 full-length release was produced by former Aggrolites member Brian Dixon and features guest vocals by Walter Dunn, former lead vocalist of Stingers ATX.

== Discography ==
=== Albums ===
- [2007] Skafiction (Rudie System)
- [2010] Ska Bless You (Rudie System)
- [2012] 3rd Kind (Rudie System)
- [2014] Everyday People (Rudie System)

=== Singles and EPs ===
- [2006] Kingston Rudieska (EP) (Rudie System)
- [2009] Ska Fidelity (EP) (Rudie System)
- [2011] Because of You (너 때문이야) (Rudie System)
- [2013] You Made Me Angry (니말이화나) (Rudie System)
- [2014] Ska 'n Seoul (with Dr. Ring-Ding) (Rudie System)

=== Compilations ===
- [2007] United Colors of Ska 4.0 (Oscar Wilde) (Pork Pie Ska)
- [2010] The Shouts of Reds
- [2012] Sanullim Reborn (Don't Go/가지마오)
