= Spring Heeled Jack (band) =

American third wave ska band

Background information
- Also known as: Spring Heeled Jack USA
- Origin: New Haven, Connecticut, United States
- Genres: third wave ska, ska
- Years active: 1991–2000, 2015–present
- Labels: Ignition Records; Moon Ska Records
- Members: Ron Ragona; Mike Pellegrino; Chris Rhodes; Corky Evans; Peet Golan; Luke Gosselin
- Past members: Dave Karcich; Chris Bath; John Powers; Justin Frazier; Joseph Busch; Rick Omonte; Pat Gingras; James Riley; Pete Wasilewski; Tyler Jones; Seager Tennis; Mike DeMatteo; Vinny Nobile; Nick Di Maria; Tom Quartulli; Nick Bacon

Spring Heeled Jack (known alternatively for a time as Spring Heeled Jack U.S.A.) is a third-wave ska band based in New Haven, Connecticut. The band was formed in 1991 by guitarist/vocalist Ron Ragona and drummer Dave Karcich. After a brief breakup, Ragona and Karcich reformed the band with a new lineup, which went on to record two albums before announcing a hiatus in 2000. While the members went on to perform in several other bands, they intended to occasionally record new material and play occasional reunion shows. However, this plan never came to fruition, as a cerebral aneurysm led to Karcich's death in 2002. In 2015, several former members returned to reform the band full-time. A third studio album, Sound Salvation, followed in 2017.

== History ==
=== Early years ===
The original lineup of Spring Heeled Jack, featuring Ron Ragona, Dave Karcich, John Powers, Justin Frazier, and Joe Busch, was short-lived due to Ragona moving to Boston to play bass for Skavoovie and the Epitones. After six months in Boston, Ragona returned to Connecticut and reformed the band, with only Karcich returning from the original lineup. By the time the band recorded its demo tape, the lineup consisted of Ragona on vocals and guitar, Karcich on drums, Mike Pellegrino on vocals and guitar, Rick Omonte on bass, Chris Rhodes on trombone, Pat Gingras on trumpet, and James Riley on saxophone. The demo tape, titled Connecticut Ska, was released in 1993. The band performed local shows and soon developed a devoted following in the New Haven ska scene. They would also contribute both studio and live tracks to various ska compilations over the next few years.

=== Moon Ska ===
The band's rising popularity did not escape the notice of Robert "Bucket" Hingley, founding member of The Toasters and owner of Moon Ska Records. Hingley signed the band to the label and had them begin recording their debut album. By this time, the lineup had changed again, with Gingras leaving and the joining of Tyler Jones. Midway through the recording process, Riley also decided to leave the band. As a result, half of the album features Riley on saxophone, while the other half was recorded with new member Pete Wasilewski, who had previously played alongside Rhodes in the Connecticut band JC Superska. In 1996, the band's debut album, Static World View, was released, and the band filmed their first music video for the song "Pay Some Dues." To support the release, the band began touring outside of their usual territory. During this time, they became friendly with The Amazing Royal Crowns, who would go on to become frequent touring partners in the years to come. The friendship between the two bands led to the Spring Heeled Jack horn section performing on the song "Do the Devil" from the 1997 debut album by The Amazing Royal Crowns.

Ska began to break into the mainstream due to commercial hits by bands such as No Doubt and The Mighty Mighty Bosstones, leading major labels to seek out ska bands to sign. The band declined to record a second album for Moon Ska, opting instead to sign a deal with Ignition Records, a label with a distribution deal through Tommy Boy Records.

=== Ignition Records ===
The band's signing to a major label led to a minor name change. The addition of U.S.A. to the band's name was the result of a legal agreement with the British electronic group, Spring Heel Jack. It was done to avoid potential confusion between the two musical acts on album covers and live performance advertisements. While some considered it an actual name change, the band rarely referred to themselves as anything but Spring Heeled Jack. Spring Heel Jack was expected to add UK to their name, as part of the agreement, but this never occurred. With this legal business out of the way, the label booked the band to record at the legendary Hit Factory recording studio in New York City. The same studio had previously been used by musicians such as John Lennon, Bruce Springsteen, & The Rolling Stones. The resulting album was Songs From Suburbia, released in 1998. To promote the album, the band toured extensively with bands such as Reel Big Fish, The Mighty Mighty Bosstones and Dance Hall Crashers. One such performance, at Roseland Ballroom, was filmed for use in an episode of the HBO music series, Reverb. They also performed on several dates during the 1999 Warped Tour. The band also filmed their second video, for the song "Jolene". The song was about the band's first tour van, which, by the time the video was filmed, had been sold in order to purchase a new one. The band didn't feel right about doing the video without the original van and it was bought back. After filming, the van was sold yet again. Some fans from Connecticut were upset when the novelty license plate, shown in the video, was from New York. This was a circumstance of the video being filmed in New York City and therefore the prop plate that was made for the video, was from New York City as well. The video received minimal MTV airplay but a clip of the video appeared regularly as part of the introduction to the daily MTV show, I Spy Video.

It was during this period that the Skalars, tour mates and friends from St. Louis, Missouri, were in need of a trumpet player to record their second album. Tyler Jones was invited to fill in for the recording of the album, titled Change Up, which was released in 1999. Spring Heeled Jack entered the studio, once again, to record three new songs that were not released. One of the songs was a cover of The Stray Cats song, "Sexy & 17" which the band regularly performed during live performances. That song was released through a digital re-release of the album years later. A second song was titled "Lonely." A third song, titled "Josie," a re-worked version of the band's single, "Jolene," was submitted for use in the Drew Barrymore film, Never Been Kissed but was rejected. The band altered the title to "Josie" to coincide with the name of Barrymore's character in the film.

Things seemed to be going well for the band until it was announced that Ignition Records was shutting down, leaving the band without a record label or label support. As this was happening, the band was in the midst of what would be their final tour of California. Kyle Herrman, an old friend of the band, accompanied them for several days and filmed the documentary, Mass Appeal Madness. While initially only available at the band's final show, the film would continue to be sold on the internet for several more years.

=== Breakup and the death of Dave Karcich ===
Shortly after the closure of Ignition, Dave Karcich left the band in pursuit of creating new music. On December 30, 1999, he played what was intended to be his final show with the band, in Plainview, Long Island. However, the band was unsuccessful in their search for a replacement drummer by the time their next performance came about at Rutgers University in New Jersey and Karcich returned to play drums with the band again. After this show, the band announced their intent to go on hiatus. Their long-term goal was to continue recording music and playing shows together, without the constant need for extensive and expensive touring. In the meantime, they'd be free to pursue new bands and projects. They announced their final show which was held at Toad's Place in New Haven, Connecticut in May 2000. Karcich returned once again, but by the time the show was booked, Chris Rhodes had already become a full-time member of The Mighty Mighty Bosstones, who were already on tour. In his place, a microphone stand stood on stage with one of his shirts hanging from it. Earlier that same day, the Mighty Mighty Bosstones had recorded a performance on Late Show with David Letterman. The club aired the television show on a large projection screen as Spring Heeled Jack performed and when the Mighty Mighty Bosstones segment aired, interrupted the set in order to watch and call Rhodes via cellphone. Together, Spring Heeled Jack and the audience sang a variation of the Mighty Mighty Bosstones song "Where'd You Go", titled "Where Is Chris Rhodes", to him.

Almost immediately, rumors about possible future reunion shows began to surface. The band's original plan to play the occasional live show and possibly record new material came to a halt on April 2, 2002, when Karcich suffered a sudden cerebral aneurysm and died three days later, at the age of 28. Eight months after his death, a tribute show was held at Toad's Place, in honor of Karcich with each band performing having had some prior connection to Karcich's life. The show ended with the reunion of Spring Heeled Jack. Dan Paternostro, Karcich's good friend from grade school, and Dave Sharma from the Skalars took his place during the performance. A raffle was held and bands such as The Pietasters, Less Than Jake and 2 Skinnee J's donated items with all proceeds being added to a scholarship fund in Karcich's name. By the end of the night, a total of $8,000 was collected for the fund.

=== After Spring Heeled Jack ===
After the breakup, all seven members continued working in music.

Ron Ragona became the singer for Lost City Angels, and released two albums with the band before departing with guitarist, Nick Bacon, in 2006. Ragona formed the band, The Murder Mile, along with Mike Gill and Michael Faulkner of The Damn Personals. In February 2009, Ragona and Bacon returned to perform a reunion show with Lost City Angels. The band performed once again on December 28, 2014 as an opening act on the third night of the Mighty Mighty Bosstones' annual Hometown Throwdown concert event.

Mike Pellegrino performs with Lord Fowl, a New Haven-based three piece rock band. The band released their debut album, Endless Dynamite, in 2008. In addition, he also played guitar in the funk/hip hop band, Bonafide. Shortly after the breakup of Spring Heeled Jack, Pellegrino briefly reunited with Ragona in Lost City Angels, before joining the Connecticut based band, Ladyfriend. He appeared on Ladyfriend's album, I Am An Autumn, before leaving the band. In the spring of 2008, he temporarily reunited with Ragona to play in The Murder Mile. He is an original member of Cenzo, a band he initially formed with Karcich and former Pilfers and Bim Skala Bim member, Vinny Nobile, for a Ska For Youth benefit show to raise money for the Twin Tower Orphan Fund after the September 11 attacks on the World Trade Center in 2001. Shows performed after Karcich's death featured a new lineup which did not include Pellegrino but in 2005 he returned to the lineup.

Tyler Jones was a member of Reel Big Fish for a brief time, after the departure of previous trumpet player, Tavis Werts. He can be heard on several songs featured on their Cheer Up! album as well as the entire Reel Big Fish: Live at the House of Blues DVD.

Rick Omonte remains active member of the New Haven, Connecticut music scene and has played bass for several bands including The Risley Dales, Crooked Hook, Headroom and The Mountain Movers. Shortly after the breakup of Spring Heeled Jack, Omonte started his own promotion company named Shaki Presents and began booking underground bands for "Sundazed at Bar", a free Sunday night event at "Bar", a club in New Haven. After almost eight years of putting on shows featuring early performances from acts such as Jack Rose and Dead Meadow, the venue canceled the concert series in December 2009.

Chris Rhodes began performing with Bim Skala Bim and had just accepted an invitation to join the band full-time when he was invited to replace Dennis Brockenborough in The Mighty Mighty Bosstones. Rhodes made his recording debut with the band on their A Jacknife to a Swan album and wrote the album's single, "You Gotta Go!". At the end of 2003, the band decided to go on a hiatus during which Rhodes began performing with The Toasters. He departed the band in 2006. Rhodes performed live with Omonte's band, The Mountain Movers and also made an appearance on the band's debut CD. He has made multiple live appearances with bands such as Less Than Jake, Reel Big Fish and NOFX. In 2007, the Mighty Mighty Bosstones ended their hiatus and Rhodes returned to his spot as trombone player. The band resumed touring and released four full-length studio albums before splitting up in 2022.

Pete Wasilewski became a member of Less Than Jake, although he is better known to their fans as "JR". The nickname was given to him in order to avoid confusion with former trombone player, Pete Anna. Wasilewski's first album with the band was Anthem. He also made a guest appearance on the debut album by The Mountain Movers.

After his departure from Spring Heeled Jack, Karcich temporarily filled in on drums for Mephiskapheles. He went on to audition for several other bands, including 2 Skinnee J's, before he was invited to join Pilfers who were looking to replace their rhythm section. Karcich performed as part of the second Pilfers lineup until they too disbanded. Afterward, he was a founding member of Cenzo with Pellegrino and former Pilfers bandmates, Vinny Nobile and Carl Barc. At the time of his death, he was a member of Avoid One Thing with Bosstones bass player, Joe Gittleman, Amy Griffin of Raging Teens and Paul Delano of Darkbuster. Although featured in the artwork for their self-titled debut, Karcich did not actually perform on the album.

=== Reunions and full-time return ===
In February, 2010, the band officially announced a reunion performance scheduled to take place at Toad's Place on May 7, 2010. In March, 2010, a second night was announced and scheduled for May 8, 2010. The opening acts for the first night were Mellow Bravo, The Organ Beats and Tip The Van. The openers for the second night were Make Do and Mend, We Are the Union and The Pietasters. The reunion shows coincided with vinyl reissues of both albums through Asbestos Records. A friend of the band, Howard “Corky” Evans, played drums for both shows. Both shows were recorded for a future DVD release.

On December 10, 2011, Ragona, Pellegrino and Evans reunited as Spring Heeled Jack Acoustic, for a show at Daniel Street, a venue in Milford, Connecticut. In October 2012, the trio was joined by Nick Bacon and Seager Tennis, on keyboards and bass respectively, to perform seven shows as part of the Asbestos Records-sponsored Skalapalooza 2012 tour which also featured the Pietasters and Pilfers.

In 2013, Ragona, Pellegrino, Jones and Evans decided to reunite as Spring Heeled Jack on a full-time basis. Omonte, Rhodes and Wasilewski declined to return. Seager Tennis and Vinny Nobile replaced Omonte and Rhodes on bass and trombone respectively. Bacon also returned to the lineup on keyboards. The band performed its first return show on May 10 at Lupo's in Providence, Rhode Island. A second appearance was made on June 1 at Irving Plaza in New York City as part of the two-day Apple Stomp concert. In October, the band embarked on a four-day mini-tour. The band began the tour at Spaceland Ballroom in Hamden, Connecticut by performing both of their albums over a two-night engagement. The show was followed by an appearance at Asbury Lanes in Asbury Park, New Jersey and a show at The Middle East in Cambridge, Massachusetts.

In July 2015, the band returned once again for three consecutive shows. The first show was on July 24 in Fredericksburg, Virginia as part of the Virginia Ska Fest. The following night, the band performed at Toad's Place in New Haven, Connecticut. The final show took place at the Sinclair in Cambridge, Massachusetts. All three shows featured the returning lineup of Ragona, Pellegrino, Jones, Evans and Bacon, alongside new members, Peet Golan (bass), Mike DeMatteo (saxophone) and Tom Quartulli (saxophone).

On May 5, 2017, the band self-released their third studio album, Sound Salvation digitally. The revised lineup, featuring Ragona, Pellegrino, Evans, Bacon, Golan, Quartulli as well as the returning Vinny Nobile and new trumpet player, Nick Di Maria, performed at a record release party at Toad's Place in New Haven that same day. The band performed again as an opening act for the Mighty Mighty Bosstones on July 26 at College Street Music Hall in New Haven. The band was joined on stage by Chris Rhodes for a performance of "Jolene" to close out their set.

On March 17, 2018, the band performed with Sgt. Scagnetti at Space Ballroom in Hamden, Connecticut. On April 28, Spring Heeled Jack was one of several bands to appear at Neshaminy Creek Brewing Company as part of This is Croydon Fest festival in Croydon, Pennsylvania. On May 27 the band performed at the 2018 Supernova Ska Festival in Spotsylvania, Virginia. A four-piece version of the band, featuring Pellegrino, Ragona, Evans and Golan, returned to Space Ballroom to perform at a benefit for their friend, Todd Rogers on October 7.

Spring Heeled Jack continued playing throughout 2019, culminating with a twenty-first anniversary celebration of the release of Songs From Suburbia at Toad's Place in New Haven on November 30. The performance saw both Wasilewski and Rhodes return for one night to join the band in performing the album in its entirety, as well as several other songs from throughout the band's history.

The band's sole performance of 2020 occurred on February 28 at Alchemy in Providence, Rhode Island. On March 22, 2020, former trumpet player Tyler Jones, died of a cause that was not made public.

The band's first performance of 2021 was at the Downtown Sounds Celebrate Shelton event in Shelton, Connecticut on July 23. Their second performance of 2021 happened at the Toonerville Music Festival in Pelham, New York on September 18 and saw the band performing with Fastball and The Verve Pipe. The band's next live performance was on April 23, 2022 when they performed at the This Is Not Croydon Fest 3 event held at the Broken Goblet Brewing Company in Bensalem, Pennsylvania, alongside bands such as Mephiskapheles, Mustard Plug, and the Pietasters. This show saw trombone player Chris Rhodes return to the lineup after the breakup of the Mighty Mighty Bosstones.

On May 5 2023, the band digitally released a cover version of Bim Skala Bim's song "Diggin' a Hole" in anticipation of the song's inclusion on a forthcoming Bim Skala Bim tribute album. The release is the first recording to feature Rhodes since his return to the band in 2022. The band's first performance of 2023 occurred two weeks later, on May 20, at The Cellar on Treadwell in Hamden, Connecticut. The show also served as a release party for the vinyl edition of Sound Salvation, released by Asbestos Records.

In April 2024, Asbestos Records released Live from the Legendary Toads Place, a collection of live tracks recorded during the band's two-night 2010 performances at Toad's Place. To support the release, the band embarked on a three-date mini-tour with stops in Stroudsburg, Pennsylvania, Bensalem, Pennsylvania, and Hamden, Connecticut. A fourth date in East Hampton, Massachusetts followed on April 27.

== Lineup ==
- Ron Ragona (guitar, vocals)
- Mike Pellegrino (guitar, vocals)
- Chris Rhodes (trombone, vocals)
- Howard “Corky” Evans (drums)
- Peet Golan (bass)
- Luke Gosselin (saxophone)

=== Former members ===
- Rick Omonte (bass)
- Pete Wasilewski (saxophone, vocals)
- Tyler Jones (trumpet: died 2020)
- Dave Karcich (drums: died 2002)
- James Riley (saxophone)
- Pat Gingras (trumpet)
- Chris Bath (trumpet)
- John Powers (saxophone)
- Justin Frazier (vocals)
- Joe Busch (bass)
- Seager Tennis (bass)
- Mike DeMatteo (saxophone)
- Vinny Nobile (trombone)
- Nick Di Maria (trumpet)
- Tom Quartulli (saxophone)
- Nick Bacon (keyboards)

=== "Classic" lineup ===
- Dave Karcich (drums)
- Ron Ragona (guitar, vocals)
- Tyler Jones (trumpet)
- Chris Rhodes (trombone, vocals)
- Rick Omonte (bass)
- Mike Pellegrino (guitar, vocals)
- Pete Wasilewski (saxophone, vocals)

=== 2010 reunion lineup ===
- Ron Ragona (guitar, vocals)
- Tyler Jones (trumpet)
- Mike Pellegrino (guitar, vocals)
- Pete Wasilewski (saxophone, vocals)
- Chris Rhodes (trombone)
- Rick Omonte (bass)
- Howard “Corky” Evans (drums)

=== Spring Heeled Jack Acoustic lineup (2011–2012) ===
- Ron Ragona (guitar, vocals) (2011–2012)
- Mike Pellegrino (guitar, vocals) (2011–2012)
- Howard “Corky” Evans (drums) (2011–2012)
- Seager Tennis (bass) (2012)
- Nick Bacon (keyboards) (2012)

=== 2019 reunion lineup ===
- Ron Ragona (guitar, vocals)
- Mike Pellegrino (guitar, vocals)
- Pete Wasilewski (saxophone, vocals)
- Chris Rhodes (trombone)
- Howard “Corky” Evans – (drums)
- Nick Bacon – (keyboards)
- Peet Golan (bass)
- Tom Quartulli (saxophone)

== Discography ==
=== Demos ===
- Connecticut Ska (1993 cassette)

=== Studio albums ===
- Static World View (1996), Moon Ska Records
- Songs From Suburbia (1998), Ignition Records
- Sound Salvation (2017), self-released

=== Live albums ===
- Live from the Legendary Toad's Place (2024), Asbestos Records

=== Compilation appearances ===
- Collision With Tradition (1994)
- WHCN Presents – Zomething Different – Live at the Sting (1994)
- Skarmageddon (1994)
- Oi! / Skampilation Vol. 1 (1994)
- i95 FM Garage Jam (1994)
- Skanarchy (1996)
- This Are Moon Ska (1996)
- This Are Moon Ska Vol. 2 (1996)
- Ska – The Instrumentals (1997)
- Welcome To Skannecticut (1997)
- Asbestos Records presents... The Best Bands You'll Ever Hate (1997)
- Mashin Up The Nation – The Best of American Ska Vols. III & IV (1998)
