= The Robustos =

American ska band

- Origin: Atlanta, Georgia, United States
- Genres: Ska, jazz, soul
- Years active: 1996–2000
- Labels: Ska Satellite Records, Beatville Records
- Past members: Michael Cassidy
- Website: http://www.myspace.com/therobustos

The Robustos were an American ska band based in Atlanta. Formed after The Skats & The Go Steadys broke up, their name is a reference to the type of cigar. Their style evolved from traditional ska to include more soul and jazz influences. They stopped playing in 2000.

== Members ==
- Tonya Abernathy - Vocals
- Brett Rakestraw - Tenor saxophone
- Chad Paulin - Trumpet
- Jonathan Lloyd - Trombone
- Rob Kincheloe - Guitar, vocals
- Elizabeth Morris - Guitar
- Jay Wallace - Bass
- Andy Bauer - Drums
- Bob Birdsong - Keys, vocals

The band reunited for two nights in June, 2007 to sold-out shows in Atlanta.

== Discography ==
- Introducing…The Robustos (1997, Ska Satellite Records)
- The New Authentic (1999, Beatville Records)
