= Songs from Suburbia =

Songs From Suburbia

Studio album by Spring Heeled Jack USA
- Released: July 21, 1998
- Recorded: The Hit Factory in New York City
- Genre: Third-wave Ska
- Length: 37:24
- Label: Ignition Records (A subsidiary of Tommy Boy Records)
- Producer: Mr. Colson

Spring Heeled Jack USA chronology
Static World View (1996)	Songs From Suburbia (1998)	Sound Salvation (2017)

Professional ratings
Review scores
Source	Rating
AllMusic	4.5/5 stars
Houston Press	1.5/5 stars

Songs From Suburbia is the second album by Spring Heeled Jack. The album was recorded at The Hit Factory recording studio in New York City.

The band released a music video for the song "Jolene". "Time" originally appeared on the band's demo cassette, Connecticut Ska. "Makisupa Policeman" is a cover of the Phish song.

== Critical reception ==
The Houston Press called the band "an insufferably sunny septet from Connecticut's bedroom-community wasteland," writing that "all of it goes down as easily as room-temperature Bud Light inhaled through an Olympic-sized beer bong." The Omaha World-Herald deemed the album "good ska tunes—many with a rock edge."

AllMusic wrote that "while Spring Heeled Jack earned themselves a niche in the East Coast ska scene with their debut album Static World View, the follow-up Songs From Suburbia is far superior."

== Track listing ==
All songs by Spring Heeled Jack USA except "Pop Song (Green)" by Engle, Green and "Makisupa Policeman" by Trey Anastasio.

1. "Mass Appeal Madness" – 3:06
2. "Jolene" – 3:09
3. "Beggin'" – 4:03
4. "Pop Song" (Green) – 2:06
5. "Waiting, Watching" – 2:40
6. "Tied Up" – 3:41
7. "MCMLIX" (1959) – 3:31
8. "Where I Belong" – 3:33
9. "Makisupa Policeman" – 3:27
10. "Time" – 2:53
11. "Morning Sun" – 3:35
12. "Man of Tomorrow" – 3:40
