= Dr. Ring-Ding =

German dancehall artist

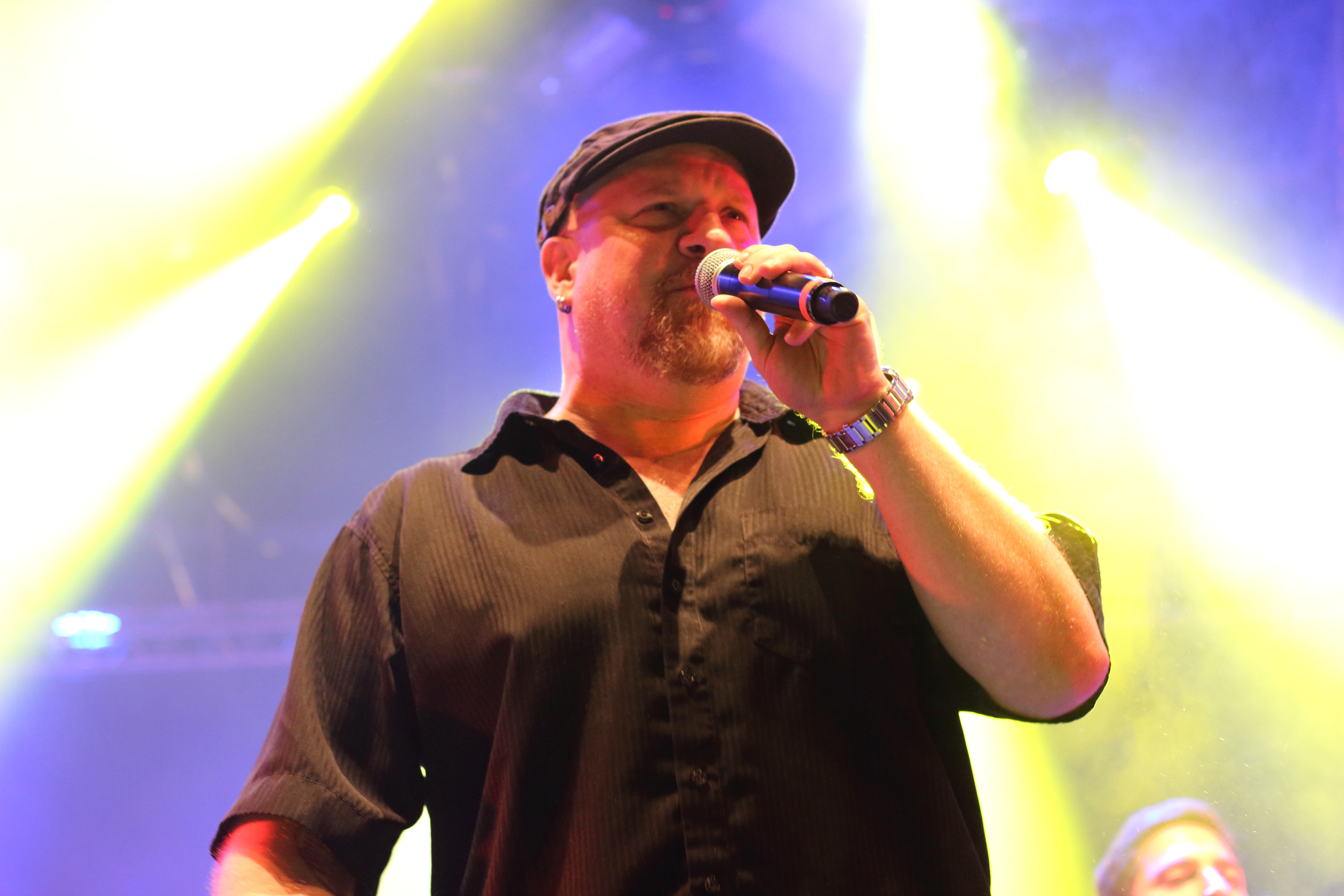

Background information
- Birth name: Richard Alexander Jung
- Born: 2 June 1970 (age 55)
- Origin: Münster, Germany
- Genres: Reggae, ska, dancehall, 2-Tone
- Occupation(s): Singer; Trombonist
- Instrument: Trombone
- Years active: 1989–present
- Labels: Pork Pie Records; Grover Records
- Website: www.ringding.de

Dr. Ring Ding (Richard Alexander Jung) is a German reggae, ska and dancehall artist.

In the more than 20 years of his musical activity, he has become an integral part of the international music scene.

Jung lives in Germany, but spent a part of his childhood in his mother's native France. At the age of six he started playing the recorder and switched later to playing the trumpet and eventually the trombone.

In 1987, he joined the German ska band El Bosso & die Ping-Pongs as trombonist and second front man, using the stage name Prof. Richie Senior. On Christmas Eve 1992 he formed the prolific band Dr. Ring-Ding & The Senior Allstars which split then years later in October 2002. Among other styles, Dr. Ring Ding utilised the Jamaican singing style, toasting mixing Reggae, Dancehall and traditional Ska beats. Dr. Ring Ding is known for his Ska and Reggae collaborations with artists including Lord Tanamo, Derrick Morgan, Laurel Aitken, Judge Dread, Vic Ruggiero, and many others. He has also performed with the Skatalites and The Toasters. Dr. Ring Ding also earned acclaim with a cover of the Johnny Cash song Ring of Fire which he recorded with the German crossover Band H-Blockx. The single reached No.13 in the German charts. He works as producer and studio musician for ska, swing, punk and jazz bands and guests with various outfits, regularly touring Europe, North America and Asia.

With members of the Rotterdam Ska-Jazz Foundation, he formed the band Kingston Kitchen, presenting a mix of traditional Ska, Blues and Swing.

In 2012, Dr. Ring Ding formed a new project entitled Dr. Ring Ding Ska-Vaganza with musicians from Germany, Catalonia, the US, and other countries, dedicated to playing traditionally flavored jazzy ska. The album Piping Hot was released in 2012.

== Chart performance ==
His song "Doctor's Darling" got its highest chart position, 23, in May 2003. Despite Dr. Ring-Ding being white, the song was included in the German black charts.

== Discography ==
Dr. Ring-Ding & The Senior Allstars album discography :

- Dandimite (Pork Pie) 1995
- Ram Di Dance (Grover Records) 1997
- Diggin' Up Dirt (Grover Records) 1999
- Big Up (Grover Records) 2001
- Pick Up The Pieces (Grover Records) 2001
- Golden Gate (Grover Records) 2002

Dr. Ring-Ding & The Senior Allstars also play on:

- Doreen Shaffer Adorable (Grover Records) 1997
- Lord Tanamo Best Place in The World (Grover Records) 2000

Dr. Ring Ding solo and in other outfits:

- Dr. Ring Ding meets H.P. Setter Big T'ings (T'Bwana) 1996
- Dub Guerilla Dub Guerilla (Enja / E19) 2005
- Kingston Kitchen Today's Special (Megalith) 2007
- Back And Forth (Jump Up Records) 2007
- Nice Again (Kingstone Records) 2007
- Dr. Ring Ding Ska-Vaganza Piping Hot (Pork Pie (CD) / Buenritmo (LP)) 2012
- Dr. Ring Ding and Kingston Rudieska Ska 'n Seoul (Rudie System) 2014
- Dr. Ring Ding & Dreadsquad Dig It All (Superfly Studio) 2014
- Dr. Ring Ding Gwaan (&March Forth) (Gecko Rex/Flat Daddy) 2014
- Dr. Ring Ding Ska-Vaganza Bingo Bongo (Pork Pie) 2015
- Dr. Ring Ding Once A Year (Pork Pie) 2015
- Dr. Ring Ding The Remedy (Pork Pie) 2020
