= Let's Go Bowling =

American ska band

- Also known as: LGB
- Origin: Fresno, California, United States
- Genres: Ska, reggae
- Years active: 1986–present
- Labels: Moon Records; Asian Man
- Members: Darren Fletcher; Mark Michel; Adam Lee; Paul Miskulin; Dean Olmstead; Glen Parrish; Robert Ruffner; Jason Boyte
- Website: www.letsgobowling.com

Let's Go Bowling is an American third wave ska band from Fresno, California, formed in 1986.

== Band members ==
Founding members

- Mark Berry - trombone (1986–1991, 2008)
- Darren Fletcher - keyboards, vocals (1986–present)
- Mark Michel - bass guitar, vocals (1986–present)
- David Molina - lead guitar (1986–1992)
- Javier Molina - toasting, antics (1986–1988, 1996)
- Jerry Mora - drums (1986–1988)
- Pete Nicholson - trumpet (1986–1987)
- Martin Stuart - alto sax (1986–1991)

Current members

- Darren Fletcher - hammond organ, keyboards, vocals
- Adam Lee - drums (1991–present)
- Mark Michel - bass guitar, vocals
- Paul Miskulin - guitar, harmonica, vocals (1993–present)
- Dean Olmstead - tenor sax (1988–1992, 1998–present)
- Jason Boyte - trumpet (1988–1992, 2024-present)
- Glen Parrish - guitar, vocals (1998–present)
- Robert Ruffner - trombone (1998–present)

Previous members

- David Wiens - trombone (1987–1994)
- Wallace Harvey - keyboards (1986)
- Dan Dorval - trumpet (1987–1988)
- Geoff Belau - trombone (1987–1988)
- Jason Ellam - drums (1988–1992)
- Scott Abels - drums (1992)
- Gilbert Lopez - tenor sax (1993–1998)
- Patrick Bush - trumpet, vocals (1993–2012)
- Tony Luna - trumpet (2012–2024)
- Erik Dvorak - baritone sax (1993–2000)
- M. Rey DeLeon - trombone (1995–2000)
- Chris Ridge - lead guitar (1995–1996)
- Lincoln Barr - lead guitar (1996–1998)
- Adam Theis - trombone (1998)
- Dakota Iyall - sax (1998)

== Discography ==
Albums

- Let's Go Bowling (cassette, 1988)
- Music To Bowl By (CD & cassette, 1991)
- "...Does The Spiral LIVE!" (cassette, 1995)
- Mr. Twist (CD, 1996)
- Freeway Lanes (CD & 12" vinyl, 1998)
- Stay Tuned (CD, 1999)

Singles

- Rude 69 / Dance Some More (7", Single) Spare Records 1988
- You Take Me / Uncomfortable Sidekick (7", Single, Ltd, Cle) Moon Ska 1996
