= Mephiskapheles =

American ska band

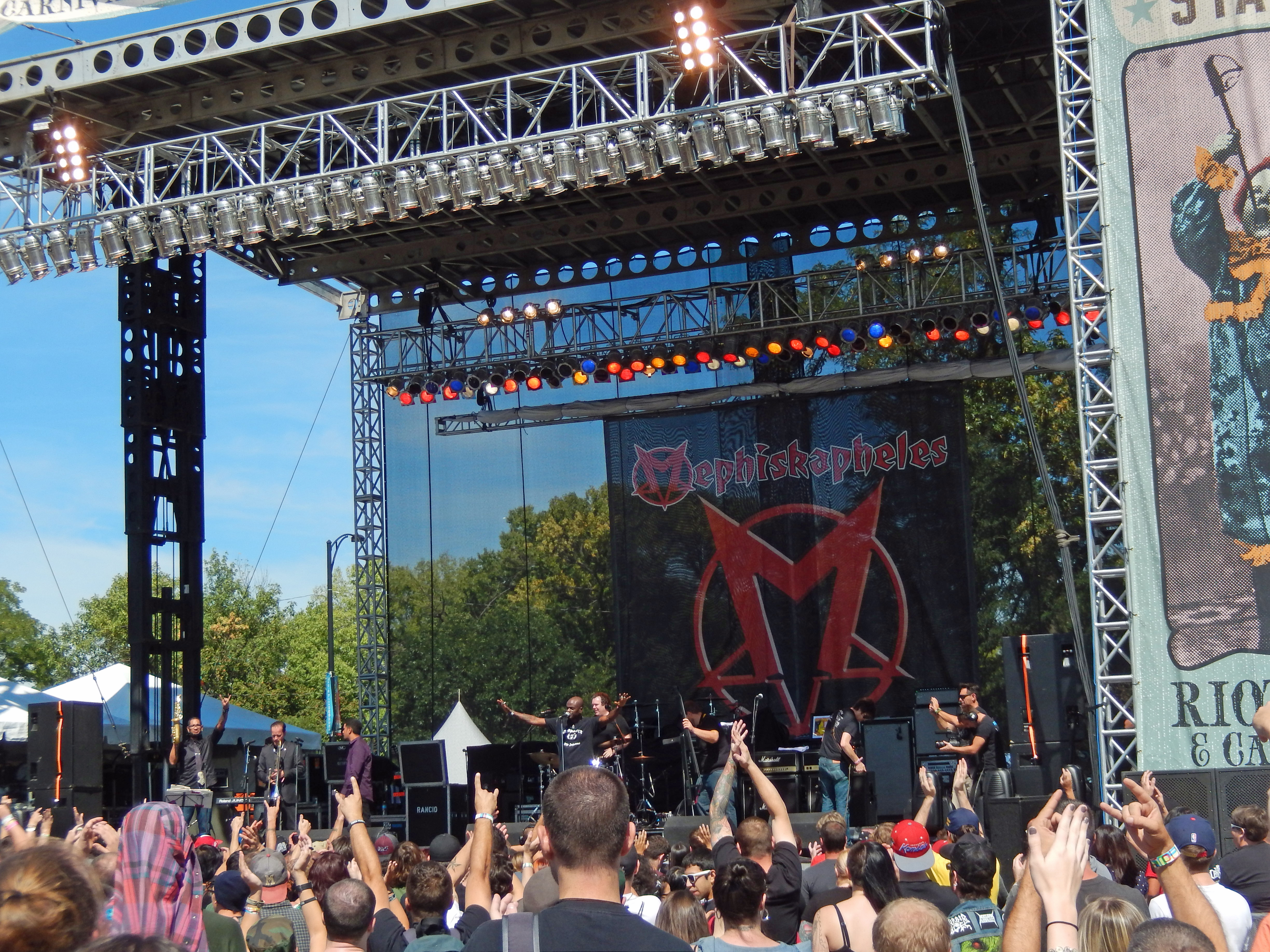
- Mephiskapheles at Riot Fest in 2013

Background information
- Origin: New York City, New York, United States
- Genres: Ska; two-tone; ska punk
- Years active: 1990–2001; 2012–present
- Labels: Pass The Virgin; Moon Ska; Koch; Jump Up
- Members: Andre A. Worrell; Adam Bower; Michael Bitz; Wayne Dunton; Brian Martin; Greg Robinson; Greg Lapine; Eric Molina
- Past members: Brendan Tween; Mikal Reich; Alexander McCabe; Osho Endo; Vattel Cherry; Victor Rice; Dan Jeselsohn; Bill McKinney; Bourbon Zeigler, Jr. Michael McDermott; Neil Johnson; Ian Hendrickson-Smith; Gardner Dunn; Nathan Breedlove; Jerica Rosenblum; Rick Sanford; Dave Doris; Gina Latessa; Stu Klinger; Ray (last name unknown); James Morris; Dave Hahn; Fernando León; Andy Muñante
- Website: mephiskaphelesofficial.com

Mephiskapheles is a ska band based in New York City. Their name is a portmanteau of "ska" and "Mephistopheles", of the Faust legend. As their name suggests, their lyrics are often playfully satanic in nature.

== Career ==
=== 1989–1994: Formation and early years ===
The band began when New York hardcore band The Shaved Pigs split up, and guitarist Brendan Tween and his roommate (drummer) Mikal Reich, both residents of New York City's East Village, decided to start a ska band. Over the next year, and after recruiting several friends, including keyboardist Brian "Underpants" Martin, the band was formed under the name Skatterbrains. It was changed to Mephiskapheles, adopting a satanic gimmick, once the band realized that another band had already taken the name.

On January 3, 1991, the band played its first show at Ugo's, a bar in Locust Valley, NY. Trinidadian Andre A. Worrell (also known as "The Nubian Nightmare") – who studied at Hunter College with Tween – became lead singer and frontman. The band recorded its 4-song debut, released only as cassette tape, titled The DEMOn. The tape contained the songs, Doomsday, Eskamoes, Dansmenot, and a cover of the ska classic, Shame & Scandal. The cassette became a pre-viral, viral hit, played on many ska, punk and college radio stations. The song Doomsday had also been widely heard on television in New York as the soundtrack to a fitness-center commercial.

In summer 1991, trombonist Greg Robinson joined alto saxophonist Alexander McCabe and trumpeter Osho Endo in the horn section, completing the section that would tour and record for the next six years. The band continued to play live, winning the Brooklyn Lager Band Search in the World Beat category in 1992 and building a devoted fan base throughout the Northeast by performing frequently at colleges and bars. In 1993, bass player Michael Bitz joined, replacing Vattel Cherry, who had taken over from original bassist Victor Rice soon after Mephiskapheles got started, in early 1991. Cherry left to tour with avant-garde saxophonist Charles Gayle.

In 1994, Mephiskapheles released its debut album, God Bless Satan, produced by Bill Laswell. BrooklynVegan included the album in their 2021 list "64 Essential Ska Albums from 1964 to Present". Originally released on the band's own label Pass The Virgin, it saw wider release after being licensed by Moon Ska Records for national distribution starting in 1995. A video the band produced for the song "Doomsday" began receiving airplay on MTV around this time. Mephiskapheles was among the bands that regularly attracted capacity crowds to Wetlands during the New York City nightclub's golden era in the mid-1990s. Other New York City clubs where Mephiskapheles headlined during its 1990s rise included S.O.B.'s, New Frontier, New Music Café, The Cooler, Tramps, Palladium, Bond Street, Cat Club, Lone Star Café, Don Hill's, West End Gate, Pyramid Club, Kenny's Castaways, Café Wha?, Nightengales, and Tilt.

=== 1995–2001: Tours and break-up ===
After completing its first cross-country tour in 1995, Mephiskapheles toured extensively through the U.S. and Europe in 1996, including a triumphant trip to Honolulu, Hawaii to celebrate a string of three hit singles on the Hawaiian Island Charts: "Doomsday," "Saba," and "Bumble Bee Tuna." Mephiskapheles began playing frequent shows with the Blue Meanies, from Chicago, and Inspecter 7, from New Brunswick, New Jersey, during this time. Soon after Mephiskapheles' first European tour, in late 1996, drummer and creative force in the early phase, Mikal Reich, left the band to pursue a career outside of music. He was replaced by Wayne Dunton who recorded on the band's 1997 album, Maximum Perversion. On the album, the group "explored a heavier side [...] by fusing heavy riffs to ska songs". With support from Moon Ska Records, a video was filmed for the track "Break Your Ankle Punk" which featured hip-hop DJ Lyvio G.

As the band's profile continued to rise, the band embarked on a national tour with British pop-punk icons the Buzzcocks in the spring of 1997. McCabe, one of Mephiskapheles' main composers during the fertile mid-1990s period, had ceased touring with the band prior to the recording of Maximum Perversion, the band on the road opting for a two-piece section with Endo and Robinson. However, McCabe, Endo, and Robinson were reunited when they recorded on Moby's version of John Barry's "James Bond Theme" for the soundtrack of the film Tomorrow Never Dies. In its various remixes, "James Bond Theme (Moby's Re-Version)" became a hit in several countries, and was included on Moby's greatest-hits albums I Like to Score and Go - The Very Best of Moby. In late 1998, Mephiskapheles shocked some fans' sensibilities when they toured the U.S. opening for heavy-metal shock rockers Gwar.

By 1999, the band had gone through a major lineup change with Tween, Bitz, and Endo all leaving the band, for various reasons. New members, bassist Dan Jeselsohn, guitarists Bill McKinney and Dave Hahn and saxophonist Ian Hendrickson-Smith were brought in to record an album, Might-Ay White-Ay, that featured reggae, hardcore, and metal with some straight-ahead ska included. Longtime Skatalites trumpeter Nathan Breedlove played on the album, but he did not tour with Mephiskapheles. After continuing to play live performances for two more years, the band stopped playing shows without any official announcement of a breakup.

After Mephiskapheles, Worrell, McKinney, Robinson, and Bitz played in the band Skull-A-Ball. Robinson played guitar in this project. The band self-released three songs on CD and played several shows before disbanding. Worrell also appeared with Bitz and Jeselsohn in the band Burn Guitars. The band featured three bass players, a drummer, and no guitars. This band also played numerous shows but disbanded after recording one demo. A third band, named Tirade, spun off from Mephiskapheles and featured McKinney, Jeselsohn, and future Joan Jett drummer Michael McDermott, performing more heavy metal-based material. This band also recorded one demo.

=== 2012–present: Reformation ===
In spring of 2012, Tween and Worrell led separate Mephiskapheles reunion shows. Worrell's lineup resurrected the 8 Iron Men-era band of 2000-01, and consisted of Worrell, Dunton, Hahn, McKinney, Jeselsohn, and Robinson, plus saxophonists Bourbon Zeigler Jr., who had toured with Mephiskapheles in the late 1990s, and Neil Johnson, who the band knew from his having been a member of The Planet Smashers and The Toasters. Tween's group, Doomsday: The Ultimate Mephiskapheles Tribute, boasted a lineup of Tween, Reich, Jeselsohn, Endo, Robinson, and McCabe, plus keyboardist Jerica Rosenblum, and performed one night in April 2012, thrilling the small crowd in an Upper West Side bar with a recital of Mephiskapheles classics. Subsequent "Doomsday" shows have included Tween, Reich, and Rosenblum with new members, and have featured other music besides Mephiskapheles songs.

Since regrouping, Mephiskapheles has continued to stay active both on tour and in the studio. Notable appearances in 2013 included featured sets at the Apple Stomp ska festival in New York and at Riot Fest in Chicago, where the band preceded T.S.O.L., Rancid, and Blink-182 on the Riot Stage. Bassist Michael Bitz returned to the band in 2013, replacing Jeselsohn who left to focus on the Brooklyn Attractors, a band he cofounded with members of Westbound Train. Guitarist Bill McKinney also departed the band in 2013, going on to found The West Kensingtons, a Philadelphia-based ska band with former members of Inspecter 7. Mephiskapheles rounded out an eventful year with gigs in support of the Mighty Mighty Bosstones and the Bouncing Souls, in addition to being the headliner for several shows.

In late 2013, founding keyboardist Brian Martin rejoined Mephiskapheles. The band played in Honolulu in February 2014 and also made tours through the Southeast and Midwest. Mephiskapheles entered the recording studio in mid-2014 to begin recording its fourth album, a self-titled EP featuring music composed by Hahn, Bitz, Worrell, and Robinson, with lyrics by Worrell. The band was joined in the studio and subsequently onstage by Burning Spear trumpet player James K. Smith. Highlights of 2014 also included a sold-out show at Irving Plaza with British punk band the Anti-Nowhere League and the Cro-Mags. Mephiskapheles finished 2014 with a holiday tour supporting the Slackers.

Mephiskapheles played several Northeast dates in early 2015 before travelling to Denver, Colorado to perform along with Hepcat at Skalorado Fest. In April 2015, Mephiskapheles recorded two new songs as part of the Converse Rubber Tracks project, at Rubber Tracks studio in Brooklyn. In June, Mephiskapheles released its eponymous EP, the first new Mephiskapheles music in 16 years, on Meph Records, in 12-inch vinyl and online digital formats. The EP was produced by Mephiskapheles and mastered by Stephen Egerton of Descendents. Mephiskapheles also made successful headlining tours to the Midwest and Florida, in 2015, as well as hosting its annual Devil's Night party (i.e., the night before Halloween) at the Mercury Lounge in New York. A handful of shows supporting the Voodoo Glow Skulls filled out a busy and productive year.

Saxophonists Neil Johnson and Bourbon Zeigler had both left the band by early 2016, clearing the way for their longtime sub, tenor saxophonist Fernando Leon to join. Leon also played on the band's 2015 EP but was not credited. Mephiskapheles continued to share the stage with established punk and ska-punk bands in 2016, making separate East Coast runs with Less Than Jake and NOFX in the early part of the year. After Meph Records released a promotional video for the song "Friends Like You", in April, the band announced work was ongoing on another video, for the song "Satan Stole My Weed". Returning from a well-received tour of Texas, in May, Mephiskapheles headlined in Asbury Park, New Jersey as part of the Punk Rock Bowling & Music festival in June 2016. Later that month, Mephiskapheles traveled to Montreal and played in support of legendary British glam rockers The Adicts at the official after-party for the Amnesia Rockfest.

After a frantic five years of activity since regrouping, Mephiskapheles slowed the pace slightly in 2017, playing several shows, occasionally venturing off the Atlantic seaboard such as to play a series of shows in the Midwest with Mustard Plug. God Bless Satan was released in a limited edition on cassette for Cassette Store Day by Jump Up in September. The sixth annual Mephiskapheles Devil's Night Danse was held in late October in two locations, at the Wonder Bar in Asbury Park and the Bowery Electric in New York. Jump Up released a 20th-anniversary colored vinyl LP edition of Maximum Perversion to mark the occasion. In November, Mephiskapheles made its first-ever tour to Central America, playing shows in Guatemala and El Salvador.

== Discography ==
- The DEMOn (cassette 1991; reissued online 2010; reissued 7-inch vinyl 2013 Jump Up! Records)
- God Bless Satan (CD 1994 Moon Ska Records; reissued online 2010; vinyl, Jump Up! Records 2013; cassette, Jump Up! Records 2017)
- Maximum Perversion (CD 1997 Moon Ska Records; reissued online 2013; vinyl and cassette, Jump Up Records 2017)
- Might-ay White-ay (CD 1999 Koch Records/EMI Records; reissued online in remastered version 2019; vinyl and cassette, Jump Up Records 2019)
- Mephiskapheles EP (2015 vinyl Meph Records; reissued cassette twofer with Never Born Again Jump Up Records 2022)
- Never Born Again EP (2019 CD Meph Records; reissued vinyl picture disc Jump Up Records 2021; cassette twofer with Mephiskapheles Jump Up Records 2022)
- Live at Supernova Ska Fest 2021 (vinyl, Supernova Records 2023)
