= The Scofflaws =

Ska band from New York

- Origin: Huntington, New York, United States
- Genres: Third wave ska
- Years active: 1988–present
- Labels: Moon Records, Moon Ska Records
- Members: Richard "Sammy" Brooks; Brian Duggan; Greg Bucking; Jared Dubin; John Soldo; Jess DeBellis
- Past members: Mike Drance; Jennifer South; Dennis Langel; Scott Miller; Johnny Brooks; Bill Grillo; Paul Gebhardt; Victor Rice; Buford O’Sullivan; Brian Lavan; Tony Mason; Kerry Lafferty; Ben Klingberg; Cary Brown; Fred Reiter; Regina Bellantese; Wendy Scher; Glen Saunders; Tony Calarco; Jerica Rosenblum; Matthew Voss; Daniel Voss; Tom McGee; Jay Hackett; Glenn Hackett; Adoni Xavier; Henning; Dave Waldo; John Soldo; Joseph Freire; Hector Lopez

The Scofflaws are a Huntington, Long Island, New York-based third wave ska band that debuted in 1988. Known for their rambunctious live shows, technically proficient horn solos and tight arrangements, the Scofflaws were one of the top third wave ska acts of the 1990s and one of the most beloved bands on the now-defunct Moon Ska label, as well as the center and focal point of the once-thriving Long Island ska scene.

== History ==
The band originally performed as the New Bohemians, initially with a stronger emphasis on novelty '60s, R&B and TV-show theme cover songs, bolstered by original ska-oriented anthems such as "Rudy's Back" and "Paul Getty". In 1988, they sold the New Bohemians name to Geffen Records (who had just signed Edie Brickell & New Bohemians), and regrouped as the Scofflaws.

The Scofflaws early sound was characterized by strong R&B and jazz influences as well as eclectic covers of such songs as Henry Mancini's "A Shot in the Dark", Danny Elfman's theme for Pee-wee's Big Adventure, Sergio Leone's "The Good, the Bad and the Ugly" theme and the Skatalites instrumental "Ska-La Parisian". Original songs like "Rudy's Back", "Nude Beach" and "William Shatner" became cult favorites due to the offbeat lyrics and quirky vocal stylings of bandleader Richard "Sammy" Brooks, co-founder Mike Drance and trombonist Buford O'Sullivan.

Their self-titled debut studio album was released in 1991 by Moon Records, followed by Ska in Hi Fi in 1995, the concert recording Live! Vol. 1 in 1996, and their third studio album, Record of Convictions, in 1998.

They toured the United States several times, including stints as the openers for Desmond Dekker and Bad Manners.

The band's lineup saw frequent changes and served as a springboard for numerous New York ska musicians, as well as sprouting several spinoff groups. Original co-frontman Mike Drance left in 1994 to form the Bluebeats with ex-member Steven Prisco, while bassist Victor Rice went on to be a founding member of the New York Ska-Jazz Ensemble and continue a career in music production. Several Scofflaws members including O'Sullivan, Paul Gebhardt and Tony Calarco also played for fellow Moon Ska artists the Toasters as well as One Groovy Coconut and Royal Roost, and the Scofflaws have often shared members with fellow Huntington band Spider Nick & the Maddogs (whose leader, "Spider Nick" Martielli, composed Scofflaws favorite "Spider on My Bed").

Although the Scofflaws have not released a studio recording since 1998, Brooks continues to lead the band in live performances within the New York area.

== Members ==
=== Current ===
- Richard "Sammy" Brooks – lead vocals, tenor saxophone
- John Soldo – drums
- Brian Duggan – bass
- Greg Bucking – guitar
- Jared Dubin – trombone
- Jess DeBellis - keyboards

=== Past ===
- Mike Drance – baritone saxophone, vocals
- Steven Prisco - guitar
- Jennifer South – keyboards
- Dennis Langel – guitar
- Scott Miller – drums
- Johnny Brooks – bass
- Bill Grillo – drums
- Paul Gebhardt – alto saxophone
- Victor Rice – bass
- Buford O'Sullivan – trombone, vocals, theremin
- Brian Lavan – guitar
- Tony Mason – drums
- Kerry Lafferty – keyboards
- Ben Klingberg – guitar
- Cary Brown – keyboards
- Fred Reiter – baritone saxophone
- Regina Bellantese – baritone saxophone
- Wendy Scher – baritone saxophone
- Glen Saunders – acoustic bass, electric bass
- Tony Calarco – baritone saxophone, alto saxophone
- Jerica Rosenblum – keyboards
- Matthew Voss – alto saxophone
- Daniel Voss – baritone saxophone
- Jay Nugent – guitar
- Tom McGee – bass
- Jay Hackett – guitar
- Glenn Hackett – drums
- Adoni Xavier – guitar
- Henning – drums
- Hector Lopez – drums
- Joseph Freire - guitar

== Discography ==
=== Studio albums ===
- The Scofflaws (1991, Moon Records)
- Ska in Hi-Fi (1995, Moon Ska Records)
- Record of Convictions (1998, Moon Ska Records)

=== Live albums ===
- Live! Vol. 1 (1997, Moon Ska)

=== Compilations ===
- "Rudy's Back" on Ska Face: An All American Ska Compilation (1988, Moon Records)
- "Rudy's Back" on Ska-Ville USA (Vol 3) - An All American Ska Compilation (1988, Ska' Records)
- "Ali-Ska-Ba" and "Going Back to Kingston"NYC Ska Live (1990, Moon Records)
- "Rudy's Back" on United Colors of Ska (1993, Pork Pie)
- "The Whip" on Oi!/Skampilation Vol. #1 (1995, Radical Records)
- "After the Lights Go Down Low" and "William Shatner" on SKA The Third Wave (1995, Continuum Records)
- "Nude Beach" and "William Shatner" on This Are Moon Ska (1996, Moon Ska Records)
- "Grazin' in the Grass" on Joint Ventures in Ska (1996, BIB Records)
- "Dr. Ring-A-Ding" on Freedom Sounds: A Tribute to the Skatalites (1997, Shanachie Records)
- "Man With the Golden Arm" on New York Beat Volume 2: Breaking and Entering (1997, Moon Ska Records)
- "Watermelon Man" on Ska: The Instrumentals (1997, Beloved Recordings)
- "William Shatner" on Skabadabadoo! (1997, Moon Ska Brasil)
- "Groovin' Up (Live)" and "Parish" on SKA the Third Wave Vol. 5 - Swing It! (1998, Beloved Recordings)
- "William Shatner" on Ska Party 1999 (1999, Beast Records)
- "The Good, the Bad and the Ugly" on The Official Long Island Ska Compilation 1999 Vol. 2 (1999, G-Note Records)
