= The Toasters =

American ska band

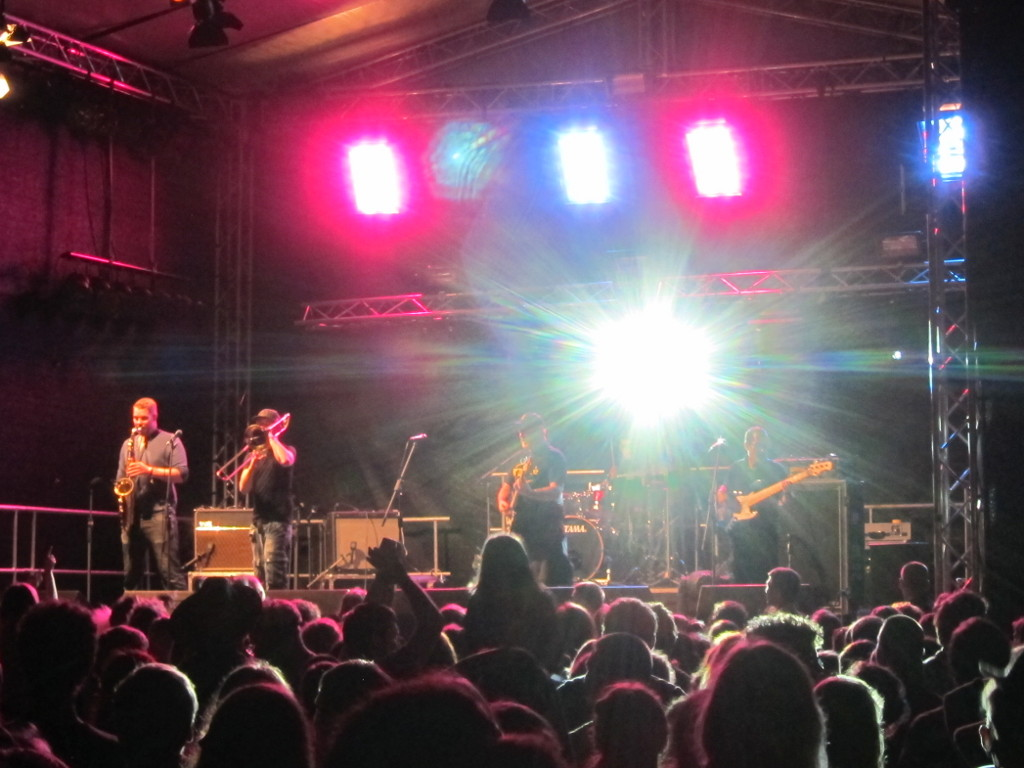
- The Toasters playing at LabaDaba Festival, August 2013

Background information
- Origin: New York City, New York, United States
- Genres: Ska, Third wave ska
- Years active: 1981–present
- Labels: Megalith, Moon Ska Records, Moon Ska World
- Members: Robert "Bucket" Hingley
- Website: thetoasters.band

The Toasters are one of the original American third wave of ska bands. Founded in New York City in 1981, the band has released nine studio albums, primarily through Moon Ska Records.

== History ==
Englishman Robert Hingley relocated to New York City in 1980, where he managed that city's Forbidden Planet comic book store location. Hingley formed the Toasters in 1981 after seeing the Beat perform at the Roseland Ballroom.

The group's first live show was supporting Bad Brains at A7 in 1981. One of the original second-wave ska bands, the early Toasters lineup included other employees of the Forbidden Planet store.

The group self-released their first single, "Beat Up", in 1983. They recorded their Joe Jackson-produced debut EP, Recriminations, in 1985. After failing to find a label to release it, Hingley formed his own label Moon Ska Records.

The group collaborated further with Jackson on later albums and in live shows. Jackson had known Hingley since 1978, and appeared on some Toasters albums under the pseudonym Stanley Turpentine. Then later the group expanded with the addition of a brass section. Their first full-length album, Skaboom!, was released in 1987.

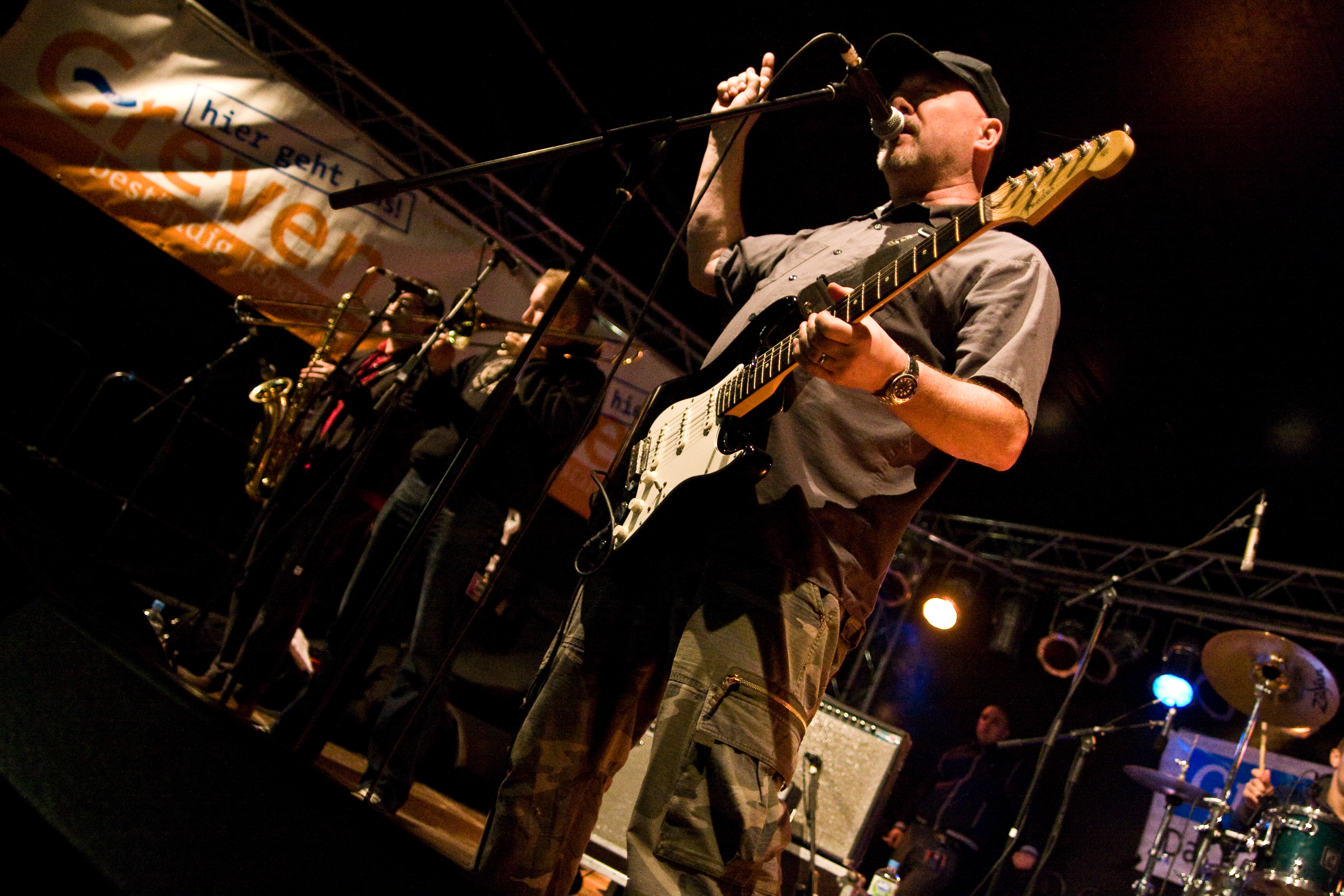
The Toasters (Hingley, foreground) on stage in 2008

=== Many members ===
Hingley has been the only constant member in the band. While the band's lineup has seen many changes, regular contributors included Coolie Ranx (vocals), Matt Malles (bass), Dave Barry (keyboards), Johnnathan McCain (drums), "Rocksteady" Freddie Reiter (saxophone), Brian Sledge (trumpet), and both Rick "Chunk" Faulkner and Erick "E-Man" Storckman on trombone.

Veteran Jamaican saxophonist Lester Sterling has made several guest appearances, and Deejay Andrew "Jack Ruby Jr." Lindo, son of Jamaican producer Jack Ruby, was also a long-time member.

Reiter joined the Toasters after playing in the New York Citizens, who had supported the Toasters on tour. Trombonist Buford O'Sullivan joined around 2000 after leaving The Scofflaws. Faulkner and Reiter went on to form the New York Ska Jazz Ensemble. The band now consists of a revolving cast of musicians, with Hingley as the central and only consistent member.

=== After Moon Ska Records ===
In 2004 Moon Ska Records collapsed, and Hingley has been based in Valencia, Spain. He started the Megalith label, which has since been the band's home. The Toasters still perform around the world, and in 2007 they celebrated their 25th anniversary with a new studio album, One More Bullet. In 2011 they undertook a 30th anniversary world tour.

== Musical style ==
The Toasters blend ska with pop music, rap, R&B, and calypso. Their mixed-race lineup has seen them break through with both black and white audiences in the US.

== Other appearances ==
The Toasters experienced a small degree of commercial success in the late 1990s due to the popularity of third wave ska in North America. Their song "Two-Tone Army" is the theme song for the Nickelodeon show KaBlam!. The song is performed by the 'Moon Ska Stompers' - members of the Toasters and friends.

The Toasters song "Skaternity" was used for the end credits of KaBlam! during most of season 1, while "Everything You Said Has Been A Lie" was used for the end credits during seasons 2-4. Their song "Don't Let The Bastards Grind You Down" appeared in the pilot episode of the animated series Mission Hill.

The Toasters have recorded background music for many TV commercials, including for America Online and Coca-Cola. Members of the Toasters performed on King Django's 1998 album Roots and Culture.

== Shows ==
In 1998 the Toasters were part of the 'Ska Against Racism' tour, along with the Blue Meanies, Five Iron Frenzy, and Less Than Jake.

== Discography ==
=== Albums ===
==== Studio albums ====
Year	Album
1987	Skaboom
1988	Thrill Me Up
1990	This Gun for Hire
1992	New York Fever
1994	Dub 56
1996	Hard Band for Dead
1997	Don't Let the Bastards Grind You Down
1998	Christma-ska
2002	Enemy of the System
2007	One More Bullet

==== Compilations ====
- 1990: T-Time
- 1995: Ska Killers
- 1996: History Book
- 1998: History Book 1987-1998
- 2000: The Best Of...
- 2003: In Retrospect
- 2007: Ska is Dead

==== Live albums ====
- 1990: Frankenska
- 1993: Live In LA
- 1998: Live In London
- 2003: en Caracas

=== EPs ===
- Recriminations (1985), Moon Ska
- The East-Side Beat EP (1987), Moon Ska
- Live In Sao Paulo Brazil (2002), Grover

=== Singles ===
- "Beat Up": "The Beat"/"Brixton Beat" (1984), Moon Ska
- "Don't Say Forever" (1990), Pork Pie
- "Chuck Berry"/"Maxwell Smart" (1995), Moon Ska
- "Dub 56" (1995), Stubborn
- "Dog Eat Dog" (2000), Grover
- "You're Gonna Pay!" (2006), Megalith
- "House Of Soul" (2013), Megalith
- "Ska Jerk" (2018), Tighten Up

Split singles

- "Talk Is Cheap" (1987), Moon Ska - split with Beat Brigade
- "The Stage" (1997), Island - promo only, split with Fishbone

== Members ==
- Robert "Bucket" Hingley: vocals, guitar
- Tim Karns: bass
- Larry Ace: drums
- Nathan Koch: saxophone
- Gilbert Covarrubias: trombone

=== Past members ===
- Josemi Martínez: drums
- Alex Bochetto: drums
- Jon Degen: saxophone
- Logan La Barbera: trombone
- Carlos "Charlos" Menezes: saxophone & trombone
- Robbie "Fancy" LaFalce: Drums [ex. Miasmics]
- Steve "the Basement" Russo: drums
- Chappman "Choppah" Sowash: trombone
- Thaddeus Merritt: bass
- Jesse Hayes: drums
- Arjen "Rotterdam Ska-Jazz Foundation" Bijleveld: trombone
- Neil "Lonestar" Johnson: saxophone
- Jason "Jah-Son" Nwagbaraocha - bass, vocals
- Dan "Duckie" Garrido - drums
- Jeff Richey - saxophone (alto and baritone)
- Mike "Philly" Armstrong - tenor saxophone
- Greg Robinson - trombone
- Lionel Bernard - vocals
- Adam "Prince Beaver" Birch - trombone, trumpet
- Tim Champeau - trumpet
- John "Skoidat Sr." Chapman - saxophone
- Mark Darini - bass
- Sean "Cavo" Dinsmore - vocals
- Brian Emrich - bass
- Gary Eye - percussion (original member)
- Rick "Chunk" Faulkner - trombone
- Paul "Spondoulix" Gephardt - alto saxophone
- Donald "The Kid" Guillaume - drums
- Gregory D Grinnell - trumpet (1985–1988), bass (1988–1990)
- Ann Hellandsjo - trombone
- Steve Hex - keyboards (founding member)
- Scott Jarvis - drums (founding member)
- Dan Jesselsohn - bass
- Neil Johnson - saxophones
- Danny Johnson - drums
- Tim Karns - bass
- Ivan Katz - drums
- Matt Malles - bass
- Johnnathan "JMac" McCain - drums
- Kashu (Cashew) Miles - vocals
- Andrew "Jack Ruby Jr." Lindo - vocals
- Fred "Rock Steady Freddie" Reiter - saxophone
- Ron Ragona - guitar, vocals
- Marcel Reginato - alto saxophone
- Nilda Richards - trombone
- Mo Roberts - drums
- Vicky Rose - bass, vocals (founding member)
- Jim Seely - trumpet
- Brian Sledge - trumpet, vocals
- Erick E. "E-Man" Storckman - trombone
- Obi-Ajula "Coolie Ranx" Ugbomah - vocals
- Big Steve Carroll - vocals
- Dave Waldo - keyboards, vocals
- Pablo D. "The Professor" Wright - vocals
- Chris Rhodes - trombone
- Ozzy "The Wiz" Cardona - trumpet (1988-1990)
- Larry "Ace" Snell - drums
- Anthony Vito - drums
- Lluís Martínez: Drums
- Dave Barry: Keyboards
- Ade McSpade- guitar.
- Teddy McSpade- guitar.
- Woody Bond- drums.
- Peter Burkis- great guy.
