= Moon Ska Records =

American ska record label (1983–2000)

- Founded: 1983
- Defunct: 2000
- Genre: Ska, Ska punk
- Country of origin: United States

Moon Ska Records was one of the most influential ska record labels of the 1980s and 1990s.

The label operated from 1983 until 2000, and during those seventeen years, only released ska and ska-influenced music. Originally named Moon Records, as a tribute to Sun Records, the label changed its name to Moon Ska Records because another label owned the copyright to the Moon Records name. The label was started by Robert "Bucket" Hingley, founding member of The Toasters as a means to distribute albums by The Toasters. The label became an American source for many British ska import albums.

== History ==
The label rose to prominence in the early 1990s by releasing albums by many of the ska genre's biggest acts, such as The Toasters, The Slackers, Hepcat, The Scofflaws, Mephiskapheles, The Pietasters and the debut album of Dance Hall Crashers — as well as many up and coming bands such as Spring Heeled Jack and Mustard Plug. The label also promoted non-Moon Ska bands, such as The Allstonians, Gals Panic, Less Than Jake, through various compilation albums. Some of these compilations featured the earliest recordings by No Doubt. In 1997, the label branched out to form Ska Satellite Records, in order to produce albums from smaller acts at a lower budget. Moon Ska also produced patches and T-shirts that were sold at ska concerts around the world.

In the mid-1990s, the label operated its own store in East Village, Manhattan. The original storefront was located at 150 East 2nd Street in the Alphabet City section of the East Village. When space became an issue, the business moved to a larger location at 84 East 10th Street. The storefront was a way for fans to purchase albums directly from the source and at cheaper prices than those of chain stores. It also became a place of social interaction for both ska band members and fans from around the world.

Amidst the end of the ska boom of the mid-1990s, sales began to drop and many records were returned to the small label. Several distribution companies were filing bankruptcy while owing Moon Ska thousands of dollars in unpaid invoices, for albums that were already sent to stores. Those same record stores refused to keep the album prices in the suggested $10 range, and instead marked them up to between $17 and $19. All of these factors led to the end of the Moon Ska store, and eventually, the label itself.

The label was survived by Moon Ska World (formerly Moon Ska Europe), which was not owned by Hingley. Instead, it was a licensed affiliate operated by Laurie "Lol" Pryor, former manager of The Business and Dojo Records and Link Records head. Based in the United Kingdom, the label released albums from acts such as Rhoda Dakar, Symarip, The Big, The Upsessions, Skaville UK and Go Jimmy Go. Unlike its American sister label, Moon Ska World released albums from outside of the ska genre as well. With the 2006 name change from Moon Ska Europe to Moon Ska World, the label shifted its focus to ska and old reggae. The label's final release was the Peace Love Faith Hope Respect Co-Exist album by the Dub City Rockers in 2011. Pryor died in May 2022.

In 2003, three years after the demise of Moon Ska Records, Hingley started his second ska label, named Megalith Records. The label has released material by The Toasters, New York Ska Jazz Ensemble, Victor Rice, Eastern Standard Time, Mr. T Bone, Bomb Town, Bigger Thomas & The Hub City Stompers.

== Label roster ==
- The Adjusters
- Laurel Aitken
- The Allstonians
- The Articles
- The Bluebeats
- Lloyd Brevett
- The Busters
- Bad Manners
- The Boilers
- Critical Mass
- Dr. Ring-Ding & the Senior Allstars
- Dance Hall Crashers
- Easy Big Fella
- Edna's Goldfish
- Hepcat
- Inspecter 7
- Let's Go Bowling
- Los Hooligans
- Magadog
- Tommy McCook and Friends
- Mento Buru
- Mephiskapheles
- Mobtown
- Mr. Review
- Mustard Plug
- Chris Murray
- New York Ska-Jazz Ensemble
- The N.Y. Citizens
- One Groovy Coconut
- The Pietasters
- The Porkers
- The Press
- Regatta 69
- The Robustos
- Rude Bones
- Ruder Than You
- The Scofflaws
- The Skalars
- Skanic
- Skavoovie And the Epitones
- Skinnerbox
- The Skoidats
- Skunks
- The Slackers
- The Strangeways
- Spring Heeled Jack
- Solabeat Alliance
- The Toasters
- The Trojans

== See also ==
- List of record labels
