= List of psychobilly bands =

This is a list of notable psychobilly bands and artists. Psychobilly is a fusion genre of rock music that mixes elements of punk rock, rockabilly, and other genres. It is one of several subgenres of rockabilly which also include thrashabilly, punkabilly, surfabilly and gothabilly. Bands and artists are listed according to their name without any preceding "The".

== 0–9 ==
- The 5.6.7.8's
- 7 Shot Screamers

== A ==
- Hasil Adkins
- Assjack (early work)

== B ==
- Batmobile
- Big John Bates
- The Boxmasters
- The Brains

== C ==
- Calamitiez
- The Chop Tops
- The Cramps
- The Creepshow

== D ==
- Deadbolt
- Demented Are Go
- Devil's Brigade

== E ==
- The Eighties Matchbox B-Line Disaster
- Elvis Hitler

== F ==
- Fireballs
- Flat Duo Jets
- Flesh Roxon
- Frantic Flintstones
- Frenzy

== G ==
- The Go-Katz
- Guana Batz

== H ==
- The Hangmen
- The Highliners
- Hilera
- HorrorPops

== K ==
- King Kurt
- The Kings of Nuthin'
- Klingonz
- The Koffin Kats

== L ==
- The Limit Club
- The Living End

== M ==
- Mad Heads
- Mad Sin
- The Meteors
- Mojo Nixon

== N ==
- Nekromantix
- Nitkie

== P ==
- Panther Burns
- The Phenomenauts
- Pitmen
- The P.O.X.

== Q ==
- The Quakes

== R ==
- Red Elvises
- The Reverend Horton Heat
- Ripmen
- Ruby Joe

== S ==
- The Silver Shine
- Stellar Corpses
- The Sting-rays
- The Strikers
- Swamptrash
- Switchblade Valentines

== T ==
- The Termites
- The Thirsty Crows
- Tiger Army
- Torment

== W ==
- Hank Williams III
- Les Wampas

== Y ==
- The Young Werewolves

== Z ==
- Zombie Ghost Train
