= The Strikers (psychobilly band) =

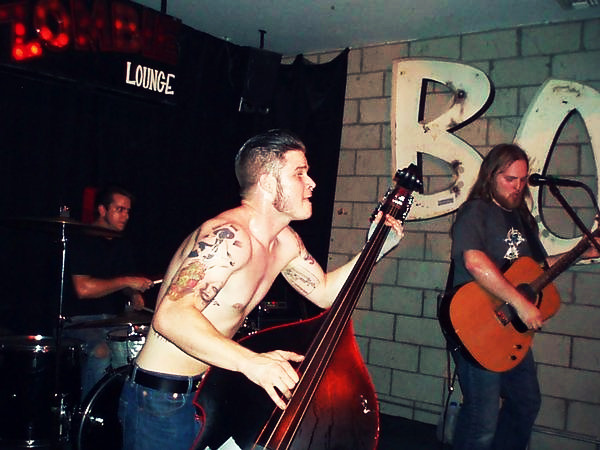
- The Strikers at the Zombie Lounge in San Diego.

Background information
- Origin: San Diego, California
- Genres: Rock and roll, rockabilly, psychobilly
- Years active: 2006–present
- Members: Joey St. Lucas; Rob Brouillard; Donovan Teske
- Past members: Kyle
- Website: thestrikers.net

The Strikers are a rock n' roll band from San Diego, California. Consisting of band members Joey (lead vocals, guitar), Rob (doublebass, vocals), and Donovan (drums), their sound is a mixture of musical genres including rockabilly, psychobilly, and metal.

In 2005, lead singer Joey was named Best Guitar Tech in San Diego by San Diego Magazine. That same year, Joey and his childhood friend Donovan began writing songs for a straightforward rock band, and were soon joined by (former) upright bassist and lead vocalist Kyle. After performing a handful of shows, Kyle left the band, leaving Joey and Donovan in search of a new bass player. In 2006, they found Rob, an upright bassist who also shared their vision of music. Joey began singing lead vocals, and the band was finally complete. The three members combined their individual musical styles into one aggressive, "kick-in-the-neck" rock n' roll band.

The Strikers have toured with bands such as The Chop Tops, Frenzy, and Three Bad Jacks, and have also shared the stage with bands The Headcat, The Meteors, Mad Sin, Zombie Ghost Train, and As I Lay Dying. In 2008, The Strikers released their debut album, No Return, and were also featured on the compilation albums Rebels of Rock 'N' Roll, Volume 1 and Psycho Ward 2. During the summer of 2009, the band embarked on their first national tour alongside The Chop Tops.

== Band members ==
Joey St. Lucas – Lead Vocals, Guitar
Rob Brouillard – Doublebass, Vocals
Donovan Teske – Drums

== Discography ==
=== Albums ===
- No Return (2008)
- Out for Blood (2011)

== Compilation albums ==
- Rebels of Rock 'N' Roll, Volume 1 (2008)
- Psycho Ward 2 (2008)
- Rebels of Rock 'N' Roll, Volume 2 (2009)
