= Pitmen =

German band

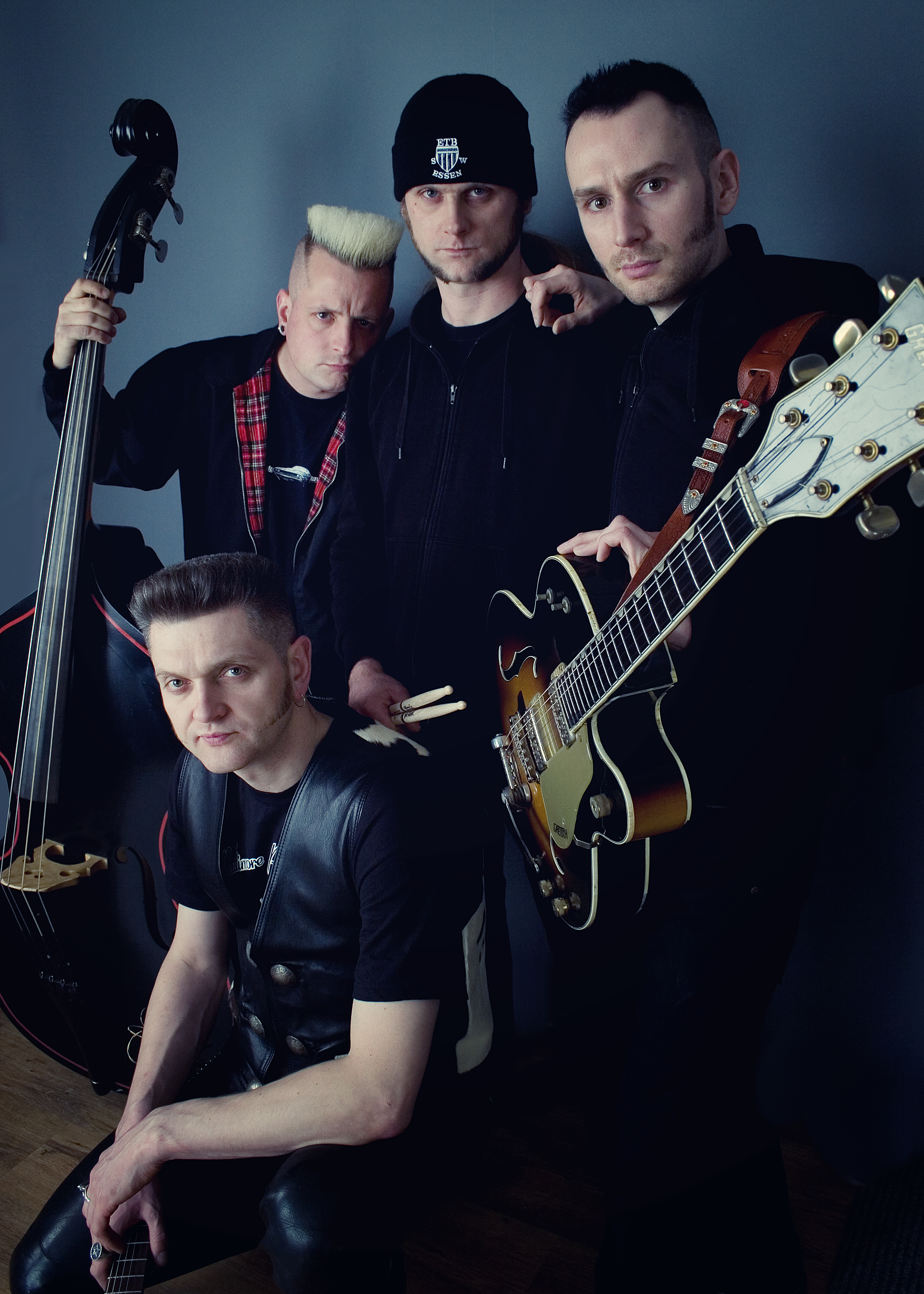

Background information
- Genres: Psychobilly, Rockabilly
- Label: Crazy Love Records
- Members: Christian Donovan (born Waleschkowski): vocals & acoustic guitar, Grischa: double-bass, Holger Grothe: guitar, Oki: drums.
- Website: www.pitmen.de

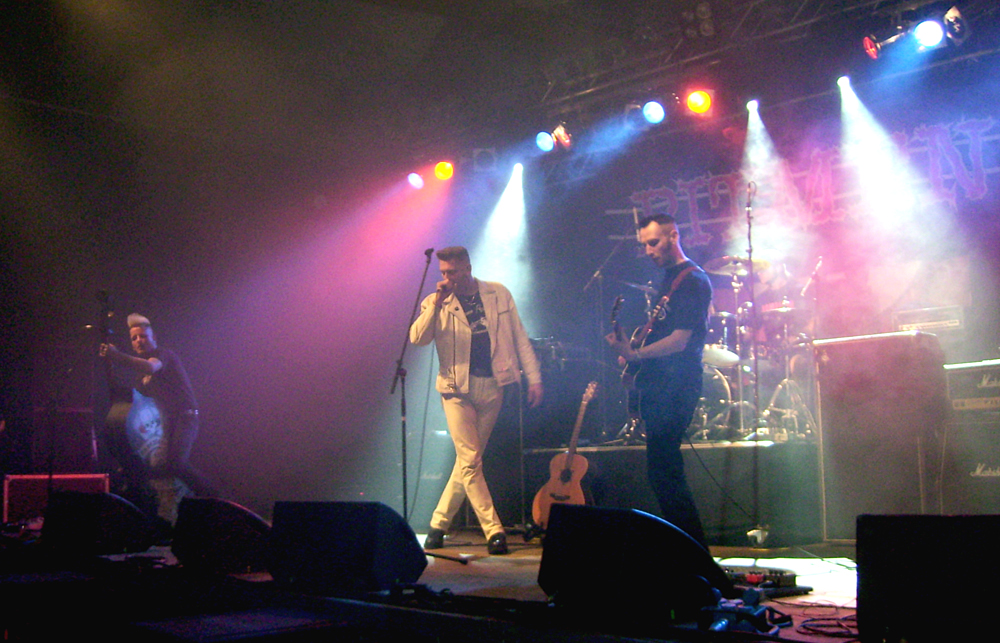
Pitmen performing at the Satanic Stomp-2008, Germany.

Pitmen is a German psychobilly group that was founded in 1995.

== History ==
Pitmen were founded in the spring of 1995, when drummer Peer Timmer and double bass-player Grischa Dördelmann were looking for suitable musicians to play with. They became attentive on Christian Waleschkowski (voice / acoustic guitar) who was performing at this time with an Irish Folk group. They also invited Christian Rubbert who played the electric guitar.

In the summer of 1996, they went into a recording studio for three days to record a demo tape. Guido Neumann of Crazy Love Records loved it so much that he released it as their debut EP Misfits. Luckily the reviews in the fanzines were very good. Support gigs for bigger bands such as The Meteors and Mad Sin followed.

In winter of 1997 they recorded their first CD called Listen To The Engine, which is still a best seller at the record stalls. Their second album Welcome To The Show was released (on Picture-Vinyl and CD) in the summer of 2001. The four-track EP including the song “Jingle Bells” was released in October 2001. The third album, Back To The Pit, was released in 2017 on March 2 that year.

In spring 1998 electric guitar player Maik Kaczmarek joined the band when Christian Rubbert left. After their gig in January 2000 he was replaced through Holger Grothe. In spring 2000, drummer Peer gave the sticks to ex-Disturbance drummer Arnd Richter. These two new members gave their debut gig at the 8th Psycho Meeting in Calella (Spain). Arnd left the band in April 2002 so ex-Dildo Brothers drummer Daniel Dolch played with them for several years. Oki replaced DD in 2016 on drums.

In 2003 they played their "last" show and decided to take a break. Every member joined and played in other bands to get new influences and play different styles.

They got back together in 2007. Their first gig in five years was at the Satanic Stomp in 2008.

2009 tours include appearances on “Club Sin pt9” (Tampere, Finland) and “Psychomania Rumble” (Potsdam, Germany) festivals. 2017 support tour for Guana Batz all over Germany and Bedlam Breakout in England.

== Discography ==
- Misfits (EP, 1996, Crazy Love Records)
- Listen To The Engine (1997)
- Fran Drescher (EP, 1999)
- Welcome To The Show (2001)
- Jingle Bells (EP, 2001)
- Back To The Pit (CD, 2017)
