= Torment (psychobilly band) =

British psychobilly band

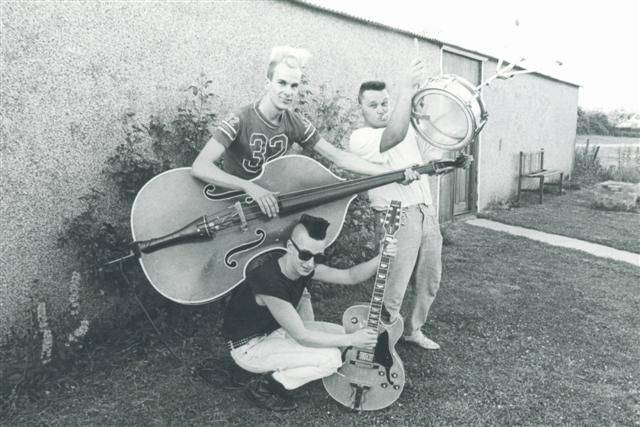

Background information
- Origin: Bristol and London, England
- Genre: Psychobilly
- Years active: 1985–early 1990s
- Label: Nervous Records
- Members: Simon Brand; Kevin Haynes; Simon Crowfoot (later replaced by Vince Mildren)

Torment were a British psychobilly band formed in late 1985 by Simon Brand, Kevin Haynes, and Sean Holder. Their name derived from the flip‑side title of a former Frenzy EP. The band played frequently at London's Klub Foot and released several records on Nervous Records during their core years.

== History ==
=== Formation and early years ===
After Simon Brand exited Frenzy in 1985, he formed Torment with Haynes and Holder in Bristol. They debuted live in December 1985, later solidifying the bass role with Simon Crowfoot in early 1986.

=== Recordings and Klub Foot ===
In 1986 they recorded "My Dream" and "The Source" for the *Zorch Factor One* compilation and released their debut album, *Psyclops Carnival* (1986), produced by Roy Williams and Doc Stewart. They made frequent appearances at Klub Foot, featuring alongside Batmobile and Demented Are Go, and contributed to *Stomping at the Klub Foot* Volumes 3 & 4.

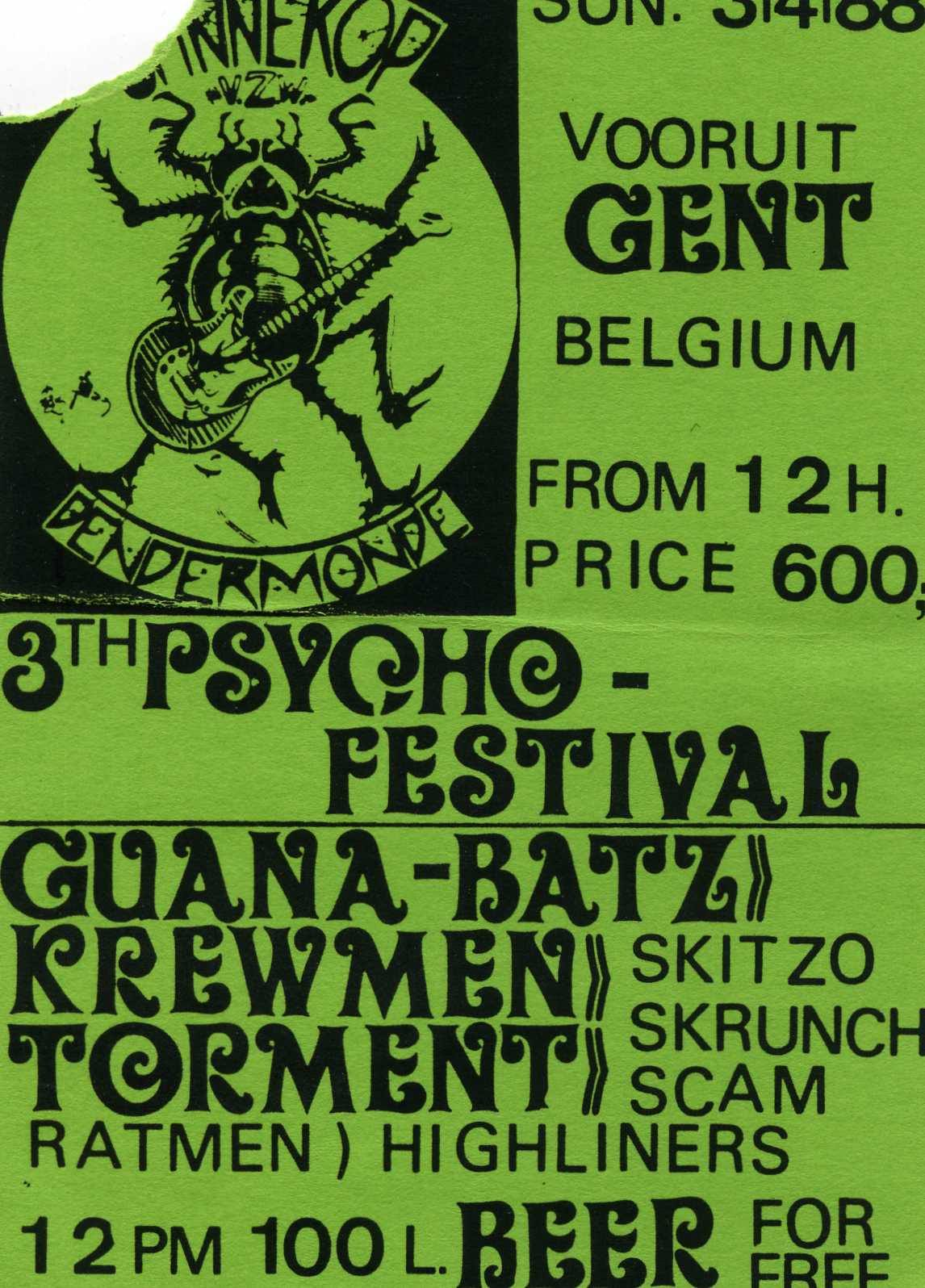
A flyer for the 3rd Psycho Festival Gent in 1988 with Torment in the line-up.

=== Continued releases ===
Torment released the *Mystery Men* EP (1987) and followed with studio albums *Three's a Crowd* (1987), *Round the World* (1989), and *Hypnosis* (1990). During this period, Vince Mildren replaced Crowfoot on bass, allowing the band to tour across Europe.

=== Later years and disbandment ===
Activity waned in the early 1990s, with Simon Brand relocating abroad and personal struggles leading to his death in the mid‑1990s, effectively ending the band.

== Musical style and legacy ==
Torment eschewed common horror‑themed psychobilly tropes in favour of darker, more personal lyrics and different arrangements. Simon Brand's songwriting gave the band an identity that influenced other bands across Europe.

== Band members ==
- Simon Brand – vocals, guitar (1985–early 1990s)
- Kevin Haynes – drums, backing vocals (1985–early 1990s)
- Sean Holder – double bass (1985–1986)
- Simon Crowfoot – double bass (1986–1992)
- Vince Mildren – double bass (1992–early 1990s)

== Discography ==
=== Studio albums ===
- *Psyclops Carnival* (1986, Nervous Records)
- *Three's a Crowd* (1987, Nervous Records)
- *Round the World* (1989, Nervous Records)
- *Hypnosis* (1990, Nervous Records)

=== EPs and Singles ===
- *My Dream / The Source* on *Zorch Factor One* (1986, compilation)
- *Mystery Men* EP (1987, Nervous Records)
- *The Lost Demo EP* (2012, Migraine Records) – previously unreleased demo tracks

=== Compilation & Live Appearances ===
- *Zorch Factor Two* (1987) – tracks "Hornet's Nest" and "True Expressions"
- *Stomping at the Klub Foot* Volumes 3 & 4 (1986) – live Klub Foot tracks
- *2nd Psycho Attack Over Europe!* (1986) – featuring "Torment"
- *3rd Psycho Attack Over Europe!* (1988) – featuring "My Dream"
- *Psychobilly Weekender Vol.1* (1991) – "Broken Home" live version
- *Rockabilly Gold* (2000) – "I Can't Stand the Rain"
- *Round the World* CD reissue (2009, Vampirette) – with EP bonus tracks
- *The Collectors' Edition* (2010, Crazy Love) – complete EP and compilation vinyl
- *Live at the Klub Foot* (2011, Trophy Records) – recorded live 1986

== See also ==
- List of psychobilly bands
