= The Thirsty Crows =

Rock band from the South Bay area

Background information
- Origin: South Bay, California, United States
- Genres: Rockabilly; psychobilly
- Years active: 2011–present
- Labels: Batcave; M.F.G.F.
- Members: Steve Huante – Vocals & Guitar; Chris Saunders – Upright Bass; Victor Cisneros – Guitar; Rich Smith – Drums
- Website: www.thethirstycrows.com

The Thirsty Crows are an American rock band from the South Bay area of Los Angeles, California. Thematically their songs tend to revolve around horror, binge drinking, and acts of revenge.

== History ==
Founded in the early 2011 by former members of the Punk/Metal band Gabriels Fallen, Steve Huante and Chris Saunders along with longtime mutual friend Mike DiRienzo.

They started recording their self-titled album in 2013, produced and engineered by Biohazard front man Billy Graziadei at Firewater Studios in Gardena, California. In the months during the mixing phase of this album, they released a live full-length record titled "Live at The Rockabilly Reunion" recorded at The 6th Annual Lake Havasu Rockabilly Reunion. Subsequently, their self-titled album was mastered by Maor Appelbaum and then released by Los Angeles-based record label M.F.G.F. Records in 2014.

In addition to touring to promote their studio release, The Thirsty Crows have shared the stage many acts including Nekromantix, Koffin Kats, Stellar Corpses, Brian Setzer, Lee Rocker, Wanda Jackson, The Chop Tops, Agent Orange, Guana Batz, The Polecats, D.I., Dick Dale, Big Sandy & His Fly-Rite Boys, and Deke Dickerson. Additionally they also perform heavily in the rockabilly festival and car show circuit including events such as Viva Las Vegas Rockabilly Weekender, Rhythm & Rods, and The Lake Havasu Rockabilly Reunion.

Although they originally started as a trio, in early 2015 they added former guitarist of the punk band The Saints and Sinners, Victor Cisneros to their roster as a second guitarist and fourth member of the group.

By mid-2015 they released a music video for their single Devil's Highway featuring indie actress Jennifer Wenger, most well known as the star of the film Confessions of a Superhero.

September 2015 saw them featured in the third volume of the time traveling Western graphic novel Guns A’Blazin’ written by Mike Wellman, illustrated by Rafael Navarro and published by Atomic Basement Entertainment as the backing bar band during a demonic assault.

In December 2017 they signed to the independent record label Batcave Records, the brain child of Rene D la Muerte of the psychobilly band The Brains to record their newest album "Hangman's Noose".

The band coined the phrase "South Bay Rockabilly" to describe their heavier, fast-paced blend of distorted rockabilly, psychobilly, and punk rock musical genres as they were heavily influenced by earlier musical acts to come out of their hometown area such as Pennywise and Black Flag.

The group is also and endorsed by Gretsch guitars, Deuce Bass Co. upright bass bridges, and Shadow Electronics pick ups.

== Members ==
- Steve Huante – Vocals and Guitar
- Chris Saunders – Upright Bass
- Victor Cisneros – Guitar
- Rich Smith – Drums

== Former members ==
- Mike DiRienzo – Drums (2011–2017)

== Albums ==
=== Studio albums ===
- The Thirsty Crows (2014)
- Hangman's Noose (2019)

=== Singles ===
- "Devil's Highway" – The Thirsty Crows (2014)

=== Live albums ===
- Live at The Rockabilly Reunion (2014)

=== Compilations ===
- Viva Las Vegas Rockabilly Weekend 19 – "Vengeful Son"
- Viva Las Vegas Rockabilly Weekend 19 – "Devil's Highway"
