= Ripmen =

German psychobilly/Rockabilly group

Background information
- Genres: Psychobilly, rockabilly
- Label: Wolverine Records
- Members: Kubi - Vocals-Upright bass Rakow - guitar Gordian - drums
- Website: www.ripmen.de

Ripmen is a German psychobilly/Rockabilly group that began in 1995.

== History ==
Founded in the mid-1990s by Kubi, Rakow and Wachi. They were schoolmates but there was no deep relationship except sitting in the same classroom. Somehow, psychobilly caught them and they met again and again at various psychobilly concerts and festivals in the early 1990s. They had always talked about their plans of founding a band. The original line-up was Wachi on drums, Rakow on guitar and Kubi on guitar. In early 1999 Kubi bought a doublebass and slapped the bass from this day on. Another half year later they had their first set and their first gig on a wedding party of a friended couple calling themselves "The Ripmen" (further gigs had been under different names).

In October 1999, Wachi died after falling from a skyscraper. They lost their drummer but only two months after Wachi's death they found a new drummer called Gordian by putting an announcement into a newspaper. Gordian joined the band in early 2000. Rapidly he learned the songs and they created a lot of new songs. That was the point when Ripmen really started. In April 2000, they went to the Octosound Studio in Berlin where they recorded the five-track demo "With Love From Beyond". They got a great response on that recording and sent it to Crazy Love Records, obtaining their first record deal. The first album, Party With the Dead, was released in summer 2001 and it nearly sold out. After playing various shows with most of the biggest bands in the psychobilly-scene (such as Mad Sin, Demented Are Go!, Frenzy, Long Tall Texans, Gorilla, Nekromantix, The Meteors and many more) they recorded their second album, Terror of the Beagle Boys, which was released in mid 2004. This LP was promoted at a lot of shows, including on a US tour incorporating dates in Los Angeles, and San Francisco.

After some quite time around the Ripmen signed to Wolverine Records and released a mini album in April 2007.

== Members ==
- KUBI – UPRIGHT BASS and Vocals
- STEIN – GUITAR
- SHORTY GUNPOWDER – DRUMS

== Albums ==
=== Demos ===
- With Love From Beyond

=== LP/CDs ===
- Party With The Dead
- Terror Of The Beagle Boys
- Graveyard in our Memories

=== Compilations ===
- High Voltage Vol.2 – "Brain in a Plasticbag" (Demo)
- Crazy Love Sampler – "Bloodmoon Rise" (Demo)
- Crazy Love Sampler 2 – "Spread The Virus"
- It Came From Hell Vol.4 – "Dig Myself a Hole"
- Dancing With a Chainsaw – "Psycho Ward"
- Graveyard Hop – "Transexual Aliens"
- Welcome to Circus Punkabilly – "Death School"
- Zombies From Mars – "Blutrot"
- Welcome to Circus Punkabilly Volume 2 – "Graveyard In Your Memory"
- God save the King A Tribute to Elvis – "Crawfish"
