= The Silver Shine =

Hungarian rock band

- Origin: Budapest, Hungary
- Genres: Punk rock; psychobilly; rock and roll
- Years active: 2004–present
- Labels: Crazy Love Records
- Members: Ati Edge, Krista Kat, Furo
- Past members: Rolee Shine, Schleki, Yoda Surfer, Frenk Set
- Website: www.thesilvershine.com

The Silver Shine is a Hungarian rock band from Budapest, Hungary. Its members include Krista Kat, an upright bassist and vocalist, Ati EDGE, a guitarist and vocalist, and Peete Jones, a drummer. Since its founding in 2004, the band has released nine albums and toured in 34 countries around the world.

== History ==
The band was formed in Budapest in the summer of 2004. All of the members had prior experience in other bands before joining together to form The Silver Shine.

The Silver Shine's debut EP was recorded in February 2005 and contains 6 songs. It was released by Commitment Records in the Netherlands as a 7" during the summer of 2005. After a couple of shows, the band went to the studio in November 2005 to record their first full-length album titled Nightmare, released on CD by the German label Crazy Love Records. This album follows the psychobilly path, including punkabilly roots. The gigs multiplied after their debut album, and they went on stage with bands like Mad Sin, The Meteors and Deadline in Hungary and abroad. The first European tour of The Silver Shine took place in September 2006. Known as the "Nightmare Tour," the band toured through Spain, France, and Germany. The band's debut received a positive critical response.

After the "Nightmare Tour", their first double bassist, Yoda Surfer, left the band and Frenk Set stepped in. After some months in the rehearsal room, the band recorded their second full-length album, titled Don't Trust the Girl with the Chainsaw. It was also released on CD and LP by the European psychobilly label named Crazy Love Records. The record contains 15 songs, including a Hungarian-language cover song and a wild psychobilly version of "Mercy" originally written by the famous American duo Collins Kids from the 1950s.

After the studio recordings, the band again went on a westbound tour, which took them to the Czech Republic, Germany, and the Netherlands. In May 2007 the Silver Shine was the first outlandish psychobilly band in Romania. In October 2007 Set left the band and Krista Kat joined as the first female double bassist in the history of the band. They played shows with her in Austria and Italy and played at the Moonlight Mayhem Festival in Prague at the end of 2007. At the beginning of 2008, they toured in Hungary with a Hungarian punk band named Semmi Komoly and embarked on another European tour.

The band played shows in Denmark, Germany, and Switzerland. After the tour, they played one headliner show at Ukrabilly Bang Festival in Kyiv, Ukraine and some shows in the Czech Republic. In May, they played at Psych Mania Rumble No.2. in Germany. In the autumn of 2008, they had a full European tour named Burning Dices tour. They played in Italy, Switzerland, France, Spain, Portugal, Romania, Poland, Lithuania, Latvia, Norway, Denmark, Germany, and Austria. Before the tour, their old drummer Role left the band due to health problems, and Furo, a friend of the band, joined them. After the tour, they went to a studio to record their third album.

This album, No Mercy, came out on Crazy Love Records and on digipak CD format at the end of March 2009. The album release show happened in Budapest with UK street punk band Deadline. At the beginning of July, The Silver Shine toured with US horror punk/psychobilly band Koffin Kats in the UK. Before the tour, they had a live radio performance at Radio Benelux. In the autumn they toured with the UK psychobilly band The Hangmen in Eastern Europe and finished their video for the song "Angels to Some." A couple of shows were booked in Germany for the end of 2009, and they went to the rehearsal room to write new material for the 4th album. The recordings of the new album were started in early February and some dates were booked in Germany for March. In April and May, The Silver Shine toured again in Germany, France, Italy and Spain.

After the European tour, they played their first show in the US on 13 June 2010 at Ink'N'Iron Festival in Los Angeles, California. Upon returning from the US they continued mastering and mixing the new album. On 14 August the band played at the biggest East European Festival named Sziget Fesztival, and in September they toured in the Balkans (Bulgaria, Greece, and Romania). In October, the band toured in Brazil for the first time, and they toured in the UK in November.

They filmed a video in Los Angeles for a new song, "Saint or Sinner," and they presented it before Christmas 2010. The new album came out digitally with the same name, Saint or Sinner, on 24 January, and the band got a deal with Longneck Records for the digipak CD. At the end of January, they went on a nightline tour for 31 days with the legendary psychobilly band The Meteors, Long Tall Texans, and with their good friends, The Koffin Kats. The tour named Psychobilly Attack Over Europe reached 10 countries from Spain to Sweden and included 23 shows. The Saint or Sinner CD came out in late April and the band played in Kyiv at Ukrabilly Bang again.

The next weekend they played in Austria with Demented are Go. The band re-recorded some songs in June from their first three albums, and the new album will be out in November for their three-week European tour with Reverend Horton Heat (US), Phantom Rockers (US), and The Brains (CAN). Before the tour, they planned to play some summer festivals like Signet Festival in Budapest and a tour booked in Spain in September. There was also potential for another Balkan tour in the fall.

== Discography ==
=== Albums ===
- Roadworn Soul (2023)
- Reloaded (2017)
- Hold Fast (2016)
- Vintage Punk Rock And Roll (2014) - Cover Album
- In the Middle of Nowhere (2013)
- Megfakult képek (2013)
- Same Old Song (2012)
- Saint or Sinner (2011)
- No Mercy (2009)
- Don't Trust the Girl with the Chainsaw (2007)
- Nightmare (2006)

=== EPs ===
- The Silver Shine (2005)

=== Compilations ===
- Psych mania Sampler #4 (2008)
- Psychobilly Wreckage, Vol. 1 (2007)
- Crazy Love (promo-CD) (2006)
