= The Brains (psychobilly band) =

Canadian psychobilly band

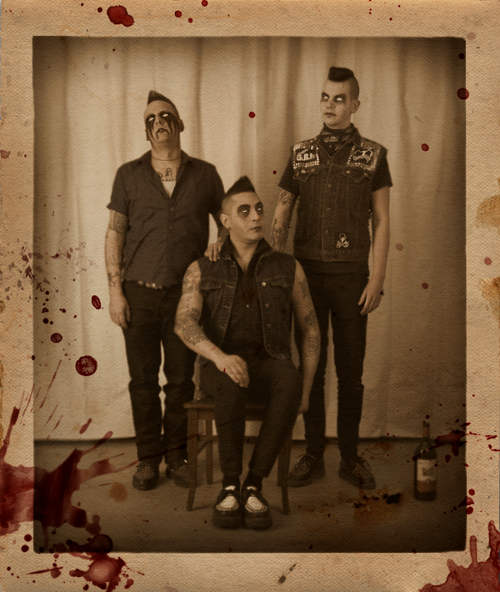
- A promotional photo of The Brains with their original line-up.

Background information
- Origin: Montreal, Quebec, Canada
- Genres: Psychobilly, horror punk, punk rock
- Years active: 2001–present
- Labels: Stomp Records, Cleopatra Records
- Members: Rene D La Muerte; Colin The Dead; Gui Kitty
- Website: thebrainsmtl.bandcamp.com

The Brains are a Canadian psychobilly band formed in 2001 in Montreal, Quebec. Known for their horror-themed aesthetic and energetic live shows, the band has played a prominent role in the psychobilly scene.

== History ==
=== Formation and early years ===
The Brains were formed in 2001 by guitarist and vocalist Rene D La Muerte (Rene Garcia), bassist Johnny Montreal, and drummer Franck O’Brains (François Demers). They debuted with the song “It's Over” on the compilation Zombie Night in Canada and released their first album, No Brain, No Pain, in 2005.

During their early years, the band was known for elaborate stage makeup, including glow-in-the-dark lenses and zombie aesthetics.

=== Rise in the psychobilly scene ===
Their follow-up albums, including Hell n' Back (2007) and the self-titled The Brains (2009), released on Stomp Records, helped establish them within the broader international psychobilly community. They toured across North America and Europe, performing with bands such as Mad Sin, The Offspring, and The Creepshow.

Line-up changes followed around 2010, with Johnny Montreal leaving and being replaced by Colin the Dead (Colin Irvine) on upright bass. Drummer Pat Kadaver joined briefly before the trio settled with Gui Kitty on drums.

=== Later albums and global recognition ===
The band's sound evolved to include more melody and multilingual lyrics, as heard in albums like Drunk Not Dead (2011), The Monster Within (2013), and Out in the Dark (2015). Their 2023 release, Satana Tarantula, on Cleopatra Records, featured guest performances by Patricia Day of HorrorPops and guitarist Danny B. Harvey.

In 2024, the band reissued The Monster Within to mark its streaming success, with the title track surpassing one million plays.

Their 2025 album Crazy Monster continues their mix of horror, Latin rhythms, and psychobilly. They also headlined the Psychobilly Meeting in Santa Susanna, Spain, in the same year.

== Musical style ==
The Brains blend psychobilly with punk, goth, Latin, and surf influences. Rene D La Muerte's vocal style mixes crooning and growling, often singing in English, French, and Spanish. Their early horror visuals gave way to a more stripped-down stage presence in later years, with a focus on musicianship.

== Members ==
=== Current ===
- Rene D La Muerte – vocals, guitar (2001–present)
- Txernobilly – drums
- Bruno Malo – upright bass

=== Former ===
- Johnny Montreal – bass (2001–2010)
- Franck O’Brains – drums (2001–2010)
- Pat Kadaver – drums (2010–?)
- Colin the Dead – upright bass, vocals (2010–?)
- Gui Kitty – drums (2018–?)

== Discography ==
- No Brain, No Pain (2005)
- Hell n’ Back (2007)
- The Brains (2009)
- Zombie Nation (2010)
- Drunk Not Dead (2011)
- The Monster Within (2013; reissued 2024)
- The Cover Up (EP, 2014)
- Out in the Dark (2015)
- Satana Tarantula (2023)
- Crazy Monster (2025)

== See also ==
- List of psychobilly bands
- Psychobilly
