= The Go-Katz =

Go-katz band (Pop/Rock)

Background information
- Origin: Loughborough, England
- Genres: Rockabilly; Psychobilly
- Years active: 1986 – present
- Label: Raucous Records
- Members: Howard Raucous; Martin Taylor; Fabio Cuschera; Johnny Riddell
- Past members: Moff (Mark Moffat), Beaker (Giles Brett), Andy Young, Dave Fawkes, John Basford, Jez Jordan, Graham Bateman, Steve Clark, Dan Clark, Billy Oxley.
- Website: gokatz.com

The Go-Katz are a British psychobilly band from Loughborough. It was founded in October 1986.

The original members were formerly from two bands – The Exorcists and The Go-Go Dakotas – and included vocalist Howard Piperides; guitarist Andy Young; drummer Wolf J. Flywheel; bassist Moff (Mark Moffat); and Beaker (Giles Brett) on rhythm guitar.

The original line-up recorded a vinyl 7-inch EP called "The Go-Katz EP" released on Raucous Records in 1987. They also issued several tracks on psychobilly compilation albums from Raucous, Kix 4U Records (Netherlands) and Rockhouse Records (Netherlands).

The original lineup disbanded in 1988, when Beaker and Wolf departed, and new drummer Dave Fawkes was brought in. Under this line-up, which lasted until 1990, they released tracks on Raucous Records (UK) and Fury Records (UK).

== Reformation ==
After more than a decade of inactivity, the Go-Katz resurfaced in 2003 in St Petersburg, Russia, with founder member Howard Raucous backed by members of Russian surf/psychobilly band The Bombers. With this line-up they occasionally gigged in St Petersburg and recorded "When A Stranger Calls", a cover of a Meteors song for the tribute album "Sympathy for the Devil".

Meanwhile, interest in 1980s psychobilly bands increased, leading to a UK reformation in 2005, again with Howard Raucous being the only original member, with musicians from rockabilly trio The Top Cats drafted in. This lineup lasted until 2010 to play psychobilly events around Europe.

The band had another two-year break, before reforming once again for one gig in 2012, with new members Sam Woods (ex-Hyperjax) on guitar and Tim Psykes on drums, which was followed by another two-year period of inactivity.

A recording session took place with Pete Hague (ex-Dueces Wild and Turnpike Cruisers) on guitar and upright bass, and Richard Blanchard (ex-Cathouse Creepers) on drums which produced the digital single "I Will Survive"

After a fourteen year break from performing, Howard revived the band once more in 2026 to play Raucous Records' 40th Anniversary Party, and The Go-Katz have continues playing with their current line-up Martin Taylor on bass, Fabio Cuschera on guitar and Johnny Riddell on drums. To coincide with the band re-emerging and the label's landmark anniversary, Raucous Records released a Go-Katz double vinyl retrospective gathering the band's EP releases together with previously unissued recordings.

== Reception ==
A 1988 review of The Go-Katz performing at the opening of the Doghouse in Loughborough described the band as "gutsy" and "foot-stomping" in their approach, and commended their "musical professionalism".

== Discography ==
- The Go-Katz EP – Raucous Records RAUC001 1987
- Real Gone Katz CD – Raucous Records RAUCD100 2004
- Maniac CD – Raucous Records RAUCD215 2008
- It's Not Fair CD – Raucous Records RAUCD241 2009
- The Go-Katz Will Survive 2x10" LP/CD – Raucous Records RAUCLP291/RAUCD291 2026

== See also ==
- List of psychobilly bands
