= Frenzy (band) =

British psychobilly band

- Origin: Bristol, England
- Genre: Psychobilly
- Years active: 1983–present
- Labels: Cat Machine, Nervous Records, ID Records
- Members: Steve Whitehouse; Kev Saunders; Adam Seviour; Steve Eaton

Frenzy are a British psychobilly band formed in 1983 in Bristol by bassist and vocalist Steve Whitehouse and guitarist/vocalist Simon Brand. The band is considered one of the pioneering acts of the UK psychobilly scene and remains active in live performance and recording.

== History ==
Frenzy started in 1983, as a trio with Steve Whitehouse, Simon Brand, and drummer Merv Pepler. Their debut single, Robot Riot, was released in 1984 on Cat Machine Records, limited to 500 copies. Shortly thereafter, they released the Frenzy EP and signed with Nervous Records.

Their first full-length album, Hall of Mirrors, was released in 1985, during which guitarist Simon Brand was replaced by Kev Saunders over internal creative differences.

In 1986, the band issued Clockwork Toy on ID Records, featuring the single "I See Red", which reached number 3 in the UK Independent Charts and stayed there for 27 weeks. Their subsequent albums included Sally’s Pink Bedroom (1987), Live at the 100 Club (1988), and This Is the Fire (1990).

Following a period of reduced activity, Frenzy resumed releasing music in the 2000s with albums such as Dirty Little Devils (2002) and Nitro Boy (2007), continuing into the 2010s with In the Blood (2010).

== Live performances ==
Frenzy was a staple of London's Klub Foot during the 1980s, helping to shape the UK psychobilly scene. The band has toured regularly across Europe and Japan.

In July 2024, Frenzy headlined the Psychobilly Meeting festival in Santa Susanna, Spain.

== Style and influence ==
Frenzy are known for fast tempos, aggressive slap bass, and a mix of rockabilly and punk energy. Steve Whitehouse's slap-bass style has influenced generations of psychobilly musicians. Alongside acts like The Meteors, Demented Are Go, Batmobile, and Guana Batz, Frenzy helped establish the UK's second wave psychobilly movement.

== Members ==
- Steve Whitehouse – bass, vocals (1983–present)
- Kev Saunders – guitar, vocals (mid‑1980s–present)
- Adam Seviour – drums (late 1980s–present)
- Steve Eaton – guitar (joined during 2007 reformation)

== Discography ==
=== Studio albums ===
- Hall of Mirrors (1985)
- Clockwork Toy (1986)
- Sally’s Pink Bedroom (1987)
- This Is the Fire (1990)
- Dirty Little Devils (2002)
- Nitro Boy (2007)
- In the Blood (2010)

=== EPs and singles ===
- Robot Riot (1984)
- Frenzy (EP, 1984)
- I See Red (single, 1986)
- Nobody’s Business (EP, 1986)
- Eastern Sun (EP, 1993)

=== Live albums ===
- Live at the 100 Club (1988)

== See also ==
- Psychobilly
- List of psychobilly bands
