= Calamitiez =

Spanish psychobilly band

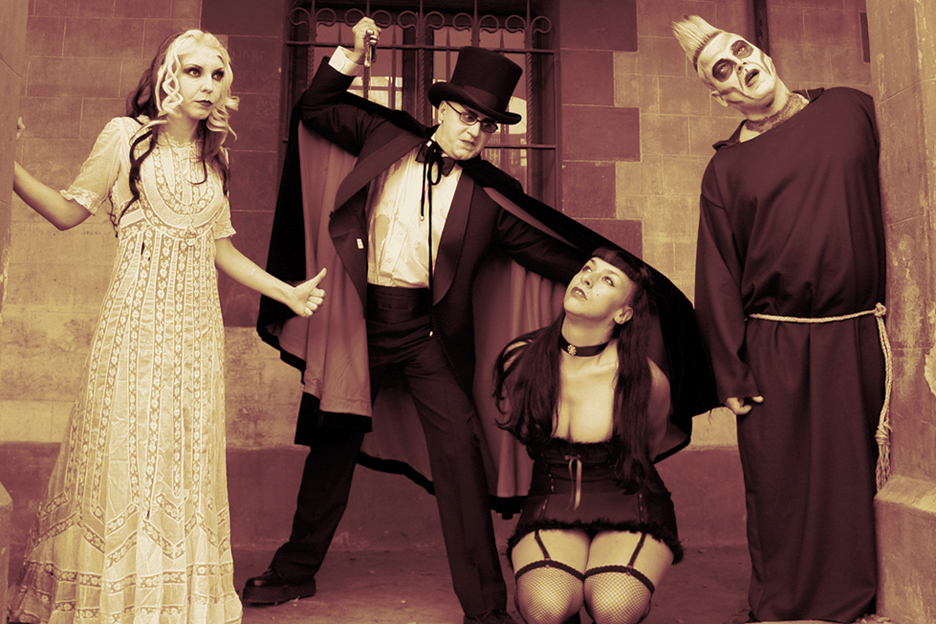
- Calamitiez

Background information
- Genres: Psychobilly, Punk rock
- Years active: 2003–present
- Label: Crazy Love Records
- Members: David - slap bass, vocals, Nadia - drums, Julio - lead guitar, Angie - rhythm guitar
- Website: www.myspace.com/calamitiez

Calamitiez is a Spanish psychobilly band from Barcelona, Spain.

== History ==
Although the band Calamities appeared in Barcelona in the early 1990s playing speeded-up covers of rockabilly classics, this project disappeared leaving no recorded material. It was the guitarist of these first Calamities that resurrected the project a decade later. The founding members of Calamitiez are Julio, lead guitarist (who played previously in Barcelona punk-rock band Hi-Fi Killers) and David, bass player and lead singer (who played previously in Barcelona neo-rockabilly band Smell of Kat). The band was initially a trio with Pep on drums. Calamitiez was formed in 2003 due to the coincidental split of both Hi-Fi Killers and Smell of Kat during the preceding months.

The band’s sound was initially a melodic mix of neo-rockabilly and punk-rock, incorporating English lyrics which embodied satirical short stories with the generic B-movie themes. Calamitiez started performing live mainly as a supporting act for visiting psychobilly bands such as Caravans and Mad Sin, and appeared at the Calella Psychobilly Meeting Festival during the 13th and 14th editions.

The band recorded their first demo "Blood, Brains and the Midnight Hour" with four self-penned songs in April 2005, shortly before Pep left the band. In the following months, Nadia replaced Pep on drums and the new formation supported Mad Sin in their Barcelona show. Their first taste of published work came with the inclusion of a track from their demo "Army of the Underworld" on Viva La Slap!! 2005 on Blue Stone Records. Later in the year Angie joined the band on rhythm guitar. Since this final addition there have been no further changes in formation. Calamitiez signed to Crazy Love Records and released their debut album (self-titled) in June 2006.

In December 2007, the band recorded their second album, Urban Legends, which was released on Crazy Love Records in March 2008.

In March 2009, the band released a limited edition vinyl recording which includes tracks from both previous albums and unreleased material.

== Band members ==
Julio: Lead guitar, backing vocals
David: Vocals, Slap Bass
Nadia: Drums
Angie: Rhythm Guitar

== Discography ==
- … from Behind the Green Door Door Vinyl - Crazy Love Records, 2009
- Urban Legends CD - Crazy Love Records, 2008
- Calamitiez (self-titled) CD - Crazy Love Records, 2006
- Blood Brains and the Midnight Hour demo CD – Unreleased, limited to 25 copies, 2005

== Compilations ==
- Spanish Rocking Bones Vinyl – Sleazy Records, 2007
- Welcome to Circus Punkabilly CD – Wolverine Records, 2007
- Viva La Slap!! 2005 CD – Blue Stone Records, 2005
