= The Termites =

Musical group from Scotland

- Origin: Scotland, UK
- Genres: Psychobilly
- Years active: 1985–present
- Labels: Crazy Love Records, Cherry Red/Anagram Records, Studio One, 13 Deluxe Records
- Members: Kenny "The Duke" Mitchell; Scott Ballantyne; Ewin Murray; Johnny Fiddles; Dougie Ritchie
- Past members: Gerry Doyle; Matthew Checkley
- Website: the Termites

The Termites are a five-piece psychobilly musical group from Scotland, which formed in the 1980s.

== History of the band ==
The Termites formed during the mid-1980s in Kilmarnock - A town that was, at the time, rich in psychobilly music with bands such as The Longhorns. It was with this band that the Termites first started out, supporting The Longhorns in Kilmarnock clubs. Initially they were a four-piece group consisting of Kenny Mitchell (vocals), Scott Ballantyne (guitar), Ewin Murray (drums) and Gerry Doyle (electric bass).

Scott Ballantyne (guitar)

In late 2005, original members Kenny Mitchell and Scott Ballantyne decided to bring the Termites back. Original drummer Ewin Murray, also agreed and so the original three were back for the first time in 15 years.

This time, Matt Black, bass player from Kenny's previous band, The Hateville Heroes, joined as upright bass player. The band started touring again. 2006 also saw the re-release of the Overload album.

The Termites signed to German record label Crazy Love Records in 2007, with a new album released September 2008 entitled Kicked In The Teeth.

On 22 January 2021, original bass player Gerry Doyle died of COVID.

Band members Ewin Murray and Johnny Fiddles (John C Grant) additionally play in Scottish traditional music band the Borland Ceilidh Band. Fiddler John Grant additionally performs as a solo musician.

== Discography ==
Termites Releases
"Devil Call" on Fury Records compilation Gypsy Girl (1987)
Four track EP on Raucous Records (1988)
Two tracks on Psycho Tendencies compilation (1989)
Overload album released on Link Records (1990)
Cramps cover "Can't Find My Mind" and "Blue Christmas" on Jungle Noise Records Psychobilly Christmas CD (1991)
Kicked In The Teeth released on Crazy Love Records (2008)
"Don't Touch" on 13 Deluxe Records (2025)
Pogues cover "Boys from the County Hell" featuring The Borland Ceilidh Band on 13 Deluxe Records (2025)

== See also ==
- List of psychobilly bands
