= Frantic Flintstones =

British psychobilly band

- Origin: Didcot, England
- Genres: Psychobilly
- Years active: 1986–present
- Labels: Nervous Records, Anagram Records, Raucous Records
- Members: Chuck Harvey (vocals); Puck Lensing (upright bass); Manny Anzaldo (guitar); Benny Zin (drums)

Frantic Flintstones is a British psychobilly band formed in 1986 by singer Chuck Harvey, in Didcot, Oxfordshire. Known for their irreverent humour and high-energy performances, the band is considered as one of the innovators of the psychobilly scene and was part of the second wave of psychobilly, alongside groups like Demented Are Go and Guana Batz. Although their live activity has declined since the mid-2010s, their early work continues to influence the international psychobilly scene.

== History ==
=== Early years and debut ===
Formed in the town of Didcot by Chuck Harvey, the initial lineup included Ric on guitar, Clive on double bass, and Toby "Jug" Griffin on drums. Their debut album, Bed Rock, was released in 1986 and quickly became a cult favourite among psychobilly fans. They followed up with several albums on labels like Nervous Records and Raucous Records, including A Nightmare on Nervous (1988) and Schlachthof Boogie Woogie (1990), the latter recorded in Germany.

=== Lineup changes and 1990s activity ===
Frantic Flintstones became known for their constantly rotating lineup, with Harvey as the sole consistent member. Notable past members include Gary Day (later of Morrissey), Johnny Bowler (of Guana Batz), Captain Drugbuster a.k.a. Graeme Grant (formerly of Demented Are Go), and Thomas Lorioux (later of The Kings of Nuthin' and Heathen Apostles).

Their 1990s output included albums like Cuttin' a Fine Line and the country-influenced Speed Kills. They maintained a strong following across Europe, particularly in Germany, where they regularly toured and recorded. In 1994, Chuck Harvey moved to Berlin.

=== Later years and inactivity ===
In the 2000s, the band continued to release material, including Freaked Out & Psyched Out (2012) and Lost Highway (2014). Despite sporadic live appearances, the band's activity declined after 2015. As of 2025, no new releases or tours have been announced, and Chuck Harvey is reported to be living in Brazil.

== Musical style ==
Frantic Flintstones' sound blends traditional rockabilly and punk rock with ska rhythms, country influences, and humorous or surreal lyrical themes. Frontman Chuck Harvey has cited The Clash as a major influence, particularly in their use of genre fusion and attitude. This influence is audible in the band's ska-infused rhythms and political irreverence.

Unlike many psychobilly bands that stick to a narrow instrumental palette, Frantic Flintstones sometimes also incorporate less typical instruments for the genre, including banjo and slide guitar, creating a more eclectic sound.

Their songs vary from fast-paced punk-inflected tracks to country-leaning ballads, all delivered with a raw, unpolished edge that reflects their underground roots.

== Band members ==
=== Current (as of last known lineup) ===
- Chuck Harvey – vocals (1986–present)
- Puck Lensing – upright bass
- Manny Anzaldo – guitar
- Benny Zin – drums

=== Notable former members ===
- Ric – guitar
- Clive – double bass
- Toby "Jug" Griffin – drums
- Gary Day – bass
- Johnny Bowler – bass
- Captain Drugbuster (Graeme Grant) – bass
- Thomas Lorioux – bass

== Discography ==
- Bedrock! (EP) (1986)
- A Nightmare on Nervous (1988)
- Rockin' Out (1988)
- Not Christmas Album (1989)
- The Nightmare Continues (1989)
- Schlachthof Boogie Woogie (1990)
- Cuttin' a Fine Line (1991)
- Jamboree (1993)
- Enjoy Yourself (1994)
- Speed Kills (1998)
- Hits from the Bong (1999)
- Too Sweet to Die (2001)
- Skin Up Chull Out (2002)
- Champagne 4 All! (2003)
- Psycho Samba My Way! (2009)
- Freaked Out & Psyched Out (2012)
- Lost Highway (EP) (2014)

== Legacy ==
In 2008, a tribute album titled A Tribute to the Frantic Flintstones "Muh to the Muh" was released, featuring international bands covering their songs.

== See also ==
- Psychobilly
- List of psychobilly bands
- Rockabilly
