= The Limit Club =

American band

- Origin: Phoenix, Arizona, U.S.
- Genres: Psychobilly, punk rock, rockabilly, punk, rock, gothic, deathrock
- Years active: 2005–present
- Labels: Phantom Cat
- Members: Nick Feratu; Niko J. NickDave
- Past members: George; Joel; Juan Carlos Larios; Monty O'Blivion; Miranda Duffy
- Website: limitclub.com

The Limit Club is an American psychobilly / punk rock band from Phoenix, Arizona, formed in 2005. The band consists of lead vocalist/guitarist Nick Feratu, upright bassist NickDave, and drummer Niko J.

The band name was inspired by the song "The Limit Club" from The Damned's "Friday the 13th" EP.

== History ==
The Limit Club first formed in 2005 with members Nick Feratu, George and Cadaverous Joel. They began to write and compose songs, which would be released on the album God Damn the Limit Club in 2007. The band choose to remain independent, recording and releasing the album themselves. After its completion, George decided to leave the band to focus on his education. The band recruited drummer Juan Carlos shortly after George left, and completed a short West coast tour in support of their then new album.

In September 2008 the band pounded out another album, entitled Phantom Cats. Around this time, The Quakes, an American Psychobilly band based in Phoenix, recruited Juan Carlos to play drums for them. This position would influence Juan's playing style from a standard sit-down drumkit, to working as an upright drummer. Tensions came to a boiling point within The Limit Club and Cadaverous Joel was asked to leave. Nicholas David (NickDave) was then recruited to fill the position of bassist.

In July 2009 the band completed a full West coast tour where they debuted much of their new material that would later find its way into the new album This is Cutthroat Business. In 2010, Juan Carlos relinquished his position with The Quakes to focus on the Limit Club. Work on the upcoming album proceeded slowly, and "Cutthroat Business" wasn't fully recorded, mixed and released until March 2011. The extra time was not in waste, for this proved to be the most professional album yet. They filmed their first music video in June 2011 for the single "Shake" from "Cutthroat Business" (directed by Elijah Bustos/UCB Productions). The band hooked up with friends The Henchmen and organized a full US tour in the summer of 2011. A success, the band gained wide exposure among fresh music scenes nationwide.

In October 2011, the band experimented with an expanded live show, featuring backing keyboards, trombone, second guitar and second drums with support from the band Manual Sex Drive. Shortly after, they officially added Monty O'Blivion to their lineup, on auxiliary guitar and backing vocals. 2012 brought a rush of activity, with two Western U.S. tours and filming of a music video for the song "Condemned Vessel" (Jeff Niemoeller/Ryan Hale).

In September 2013, the band organized and completed their first European tour, playing sixteen shows in seven different countries throughout the UK and Europe. In the late Spring of 2014, The Limit Club released a four-track vinyl EP entitled "Wild Four".

In 2015, the band celebrated their tenth anniversary by touring the American Midwest and East Coast in July 2015, followed by a monthlong tour of Europe in September 2015. The two tours took the band to Chicago, New York, Detroit, Cleveland, Boston as well as far off locales such as France, Germany, Austria, Romania and Slovenia. In October 2015, the Limit Club opened night one of Tiger Army's sold out Octoberflame VII at the Observatory in Santa Ana, CA.

In 2017, the band gained two new members; Niko J. on stand-up drums and vocals and Miranda Duffy on guitar and vocals. With the new lineup, the band recorded their fourth full length album entitled "Kid Bitchin'" over the summer of 2017 first half of 2018. The album was recorded in San Diego, CA with Kenny Hill (Guitarist with AK, formerly of the Quakes, Blackjackits) and in Tempe, AZ with Derrick Fish at FC Studios. The album was mastered by Rene De Le Muerte of the Brains and Nekromantix.

== Band members ==
Current

- Nick Feratu – Lead vocals, Guitar (2005–present)
- Niko J. – Drums, Backing vocals (2016–present)
- NickDave – Upright bass, Backing vocals (2008–present)

Former

- Miranda Duffy – Guitar, Backing vocals (2017–2024)
- Monty O'Blivion – Guitar, Saxophone (2011–2017)
- Juan Carlos – Drums (2007–2016)
- George – drums (2005–2007)
- Cadaverous Joel – upright bass (2005–2008)
- Jack Mattern – drums (2007)

== Discography ==
- God Damn the Limit Club (2007)

1. Factory 43
2. The Kids Are All Dead
3. You're Pretty Warm (For Someone With A Cold Heart)
4. The Frankenstein Bop
5. Sleeptalking
6. Cold As A Coffin
7. Black White and Red
8. Spider Crawl
9. Braindead
10. Strangeways
11. Black Hole
12. Losing My Mind On Purpose
13. Lost On Planet-X

- Phantom Cats (2008)

1. I'm A Nightmare
2. Sister Found The Cure
3. You're Doomed If You're A Clone
4. Let's Get Religious!
5. Death To You
6. The Shadow Of Love
7. Phantom Cats
8. Alice
9. Praying Mantisss
10. The Great Unknown

- This is Cutthroat Business (2011)

1. Swing Through the Apocalypse
2. Shake
3. Bleeding Taper Candle
4. Life of Crime
5. Kick In the Eye
6. Return To My Darker Self
7. Cutthroat Business
8. Fang (Don't Forget My Misery)
9. Condemned Vessel
10. I Hope You Hurt
11. Seven Rusty Blades
12. Just a Mirage

- Wild Four EP (2014)

1. When You Burn (You're Gonna Scream)
2. Like Wild Birds
3. Who Are Your Gods?
4. Laugh Track

- Kid Bitchin' (2018)

1. The Ballad of Kid Bitchin'
2. You Are A Lie
3. One Minute
4. Unfashionably Late
5. Only A Lad
6. Minor Swing
7. It's Not Me
8. Step Into The Fear
9. Wheel of Self Destruction
10. Crooked Teeth
11. Painless
12. I Didn't See Nothin'
