= Switchblade Valentines =

Canadian psychobilly band

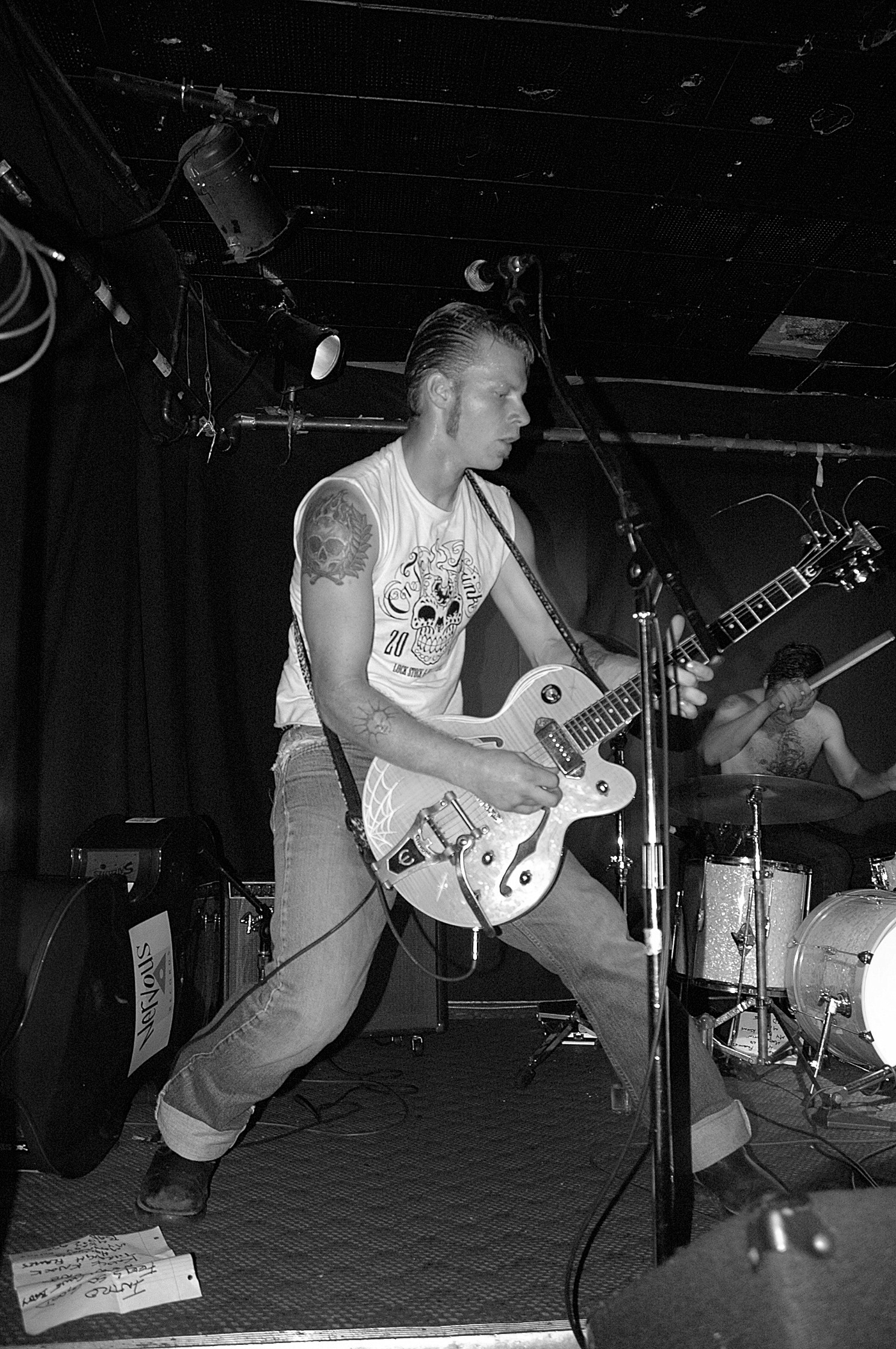
- Mickey Valentine live

Background information
- Origin: Victoria, British Columbia, Canada
- Genres: Psychobilly
- Years active: 2004–present
- Members: R.P. Fogerty; Mike Valentine; Paul Valentine; Alec Valentine
- Website: Switchblade Valentines

The Switchblade Valentines are a Canadian psychobilly band from Victoria. The band consists of R.P. Fogarty on vocals and guitar, Mikey Valentine on guitar and backing vocals, Pauly Valentine on drums, and Alec Valentine on standup bass.

== History ==
Switchblade Valentines was formed in 2004. Fogarty left the band for a short time but eventually rejoined. The band performed around Vancouver in 2005 and in 2007. That year their EP Through the Flames was released; the band toured on the east coast in support of recording.

== Discography ==
- 2005: ST
- 2007: Through Flames EP

=== Compilations ===
- 2005: Zombie Night in Canada Vol. 2 (Stumble Records)
- 2006: Cavalcade of the Scars (Self Righteous)

== Band members ==
=== Current members ===
- R.P. Fogerty: vocals, guitar
- Mikey Valentine: backing vocals, guitar
- Pauly Valentine: drums
- Alec Valentine: upright bass

== See also ==
- List of psychobilly bands
