= The Koffin Kats =

American psychobilly band

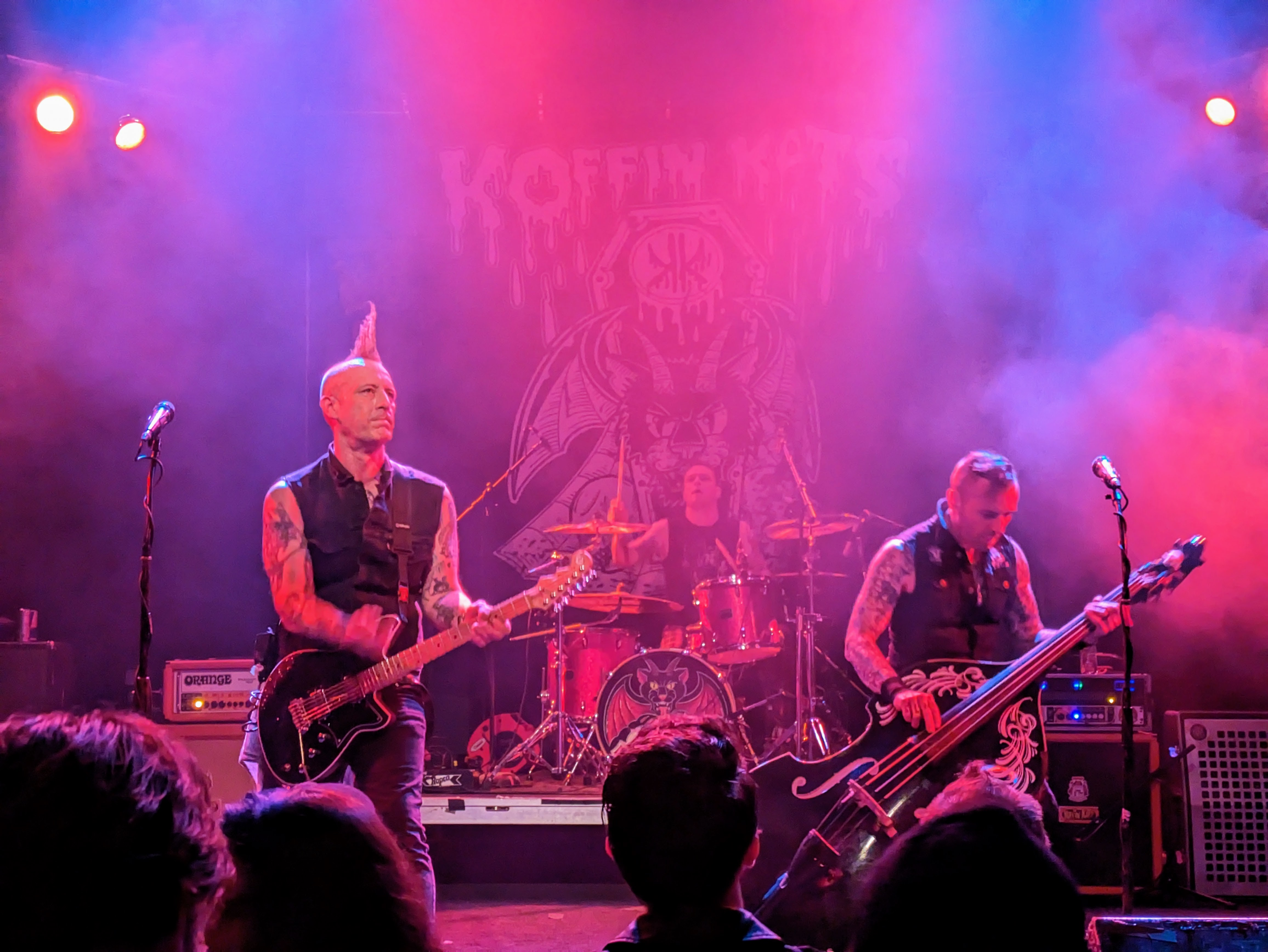

Background information
- Origin: Detroit, Michigan
- Genres: Psychobilly, horror punk, rockabilly
- Years active: 2003–present
- Labels: Stomp; Ring of Fire; Sailor's Grave
- Members: Vic Victor; Tommy Koffins; Eric "E Ball" Wall
- Website: www.koffinkatsrock.com

The Koffin Kats are an American psychobilly band formed in 2003 in Detroit, Michigan. Known for their high-energy performances and unique blend of punk rock, rockabilly, and psychobilly influences, the band has gained a dedicated following both in the United States and internationally.

== History ==
The Koffin Kats were formed by vocalist and upright bassist Vic Victor, guitarist Tommy Koffin, and drummer Eric "E-Ball" Walls in Detroit, Michigan in 2003. Victor and Walls had previously played in a band together in high school.

Drawing inspiration from classic rock 'n' roll, punk, and horror, the band established a distinct sound and image self-described as "Gothabilly."

=== Members ===
- Vic Victor, Bass and Lead Vocalist, 2003 – Present
- Tommy Koffin, Guitar, 2003-2010, 2016 – Present
- Eric "E-Ball" Walls, Drums, 2003, 2006 – Present
- Damian Detroit, Drums, 2003 – 2005
- Katch Katcher, Drums, 2006
- Ian Jarrell, Guitar, 2010 – 2014
- John Kay, Guitar, 2015 – 2016

== Style and influences ==
While most often described as psychobilly or rockabilly, the Koffin Kats' style has also been compared to punk, heavy metal, surf, garage rock and psychedelic rock, with critics often invoking related acts such as the Misfits, Social Distorion, and The Cult. Vic Victor, when asked in an interview in 2012 about the band's style, emphasized that The Koffin Kats don't want to commit to one genre or style of music but that psychobilly did fit some of their songs. Victor described the genre as a "sped up, amped up version of rockabilly....taking rockabilly subject matter and going over the top with elements of sci-fi, horror, and boozin' to a more graphic level."

== Discography ==
=== Albums ===
- The Koffin Kats (2003, Ideal Productions)
- Inhumane (2005, Psychobilly US, Hairball 8)
- Straying from the Pack (2006, Psychobilly US, Hairball 8)
- Drunk in the Daylight (2008, Psychobilly US, Hairball 8)
- Forever for Hire (2009, Stomp Records)
- From Our Hands to Yours (2011, with 12 Step Rebels)
- Our Way & the Highway (2012, Sailor's Grave Records)
- Born of the Motor (2013, Sailor's Grave Records)
- Party Time in the End Times (2017, Koffin Kats Records)
- Higher Lows (2024, Koffin Kats Records)

=== Singles and EPs ===
- The Way of the Road (Sailor's Grave Records, 2012)
- Ya Can't Take it With Ya (Koffin Kats Records, 2021)
