= Zombie Ghost Train =

Australian band

- Also known as: ZGT; Bone Daddies
- Origin: Sydney, New South Wales, Australia
- Genres: Gothabilly; psychobilly; horror punk
- Years active: 2002–2009; 2025
- Labels: Shrunken Head/MGM; Resist
- Past members: Stu Arkoff; Captain Reckless; Azzy T; JM

Zombie Ghost Train (sometimes seen as ZGT) were an Australian rock band located in Sydney, NSW, Australia. The band formed with Stu Arkoff (guitars and vocals), Azzy T (drums), and Captain Reckless (bass and backing vocals). In 2007, Azzy T left to pursue other musical ventures and was replaced by JM until 2008. The band released two albums, Glad Rags & Body Bags (April 2004) and Dealing the Death Card (May 2007), and a seven-track extended play, Monster Formal Wear (2003).

== History ==
Zombie Ghost Train were formed in Sydney as a gothabilly and psychobilly group by Stu Arkoff (a.k.a. Stuart Hibberd) on lead vocals, guitar and theremin, Captain Reckless (a.k.a. Aaron Mol) on slap bass and backing vocals, and AzzA-T (a.k.a. Aaron James Trew) on drums and percussion. Arkoff and Reckless were former members of the Ark Off Experiment. The band toured Australia, Europe and the United States. The band members, when appearing on stage, dress in "zombified" clothes, featuring tears and bloodstains. Each member has his hair in an extreme style of a quiff, teddy boy cut or pompadour. They wore zombie make up, complete with stitches across the face. In 2008, one of Sydney's city guides, TwoThousand, called the band, "Australia's best kept secret. . . These mortuary musicians are the best thing psychobilly has seen since The Cramps".

Zombie Ghost Train were featured in the Horror punk segment of interviews on the Tribal Area 8 DVD compiled by German video-magazine, Tribal Area. In an interview with Voltage Media, Sydney band, The Horrorwood Mannequins listed playing with Zombie Ghost Train as one of their biggest moments in their music career. Collapse Board classed the band's style as being part of "the horror aesthetic and supernatural lyric themes" of psychobilly.

=== Monster Formal Wear ===
Zombie Ghost Train released an EP called Monster Formal Wear in 2003 and licensed to German label, Crazy Love Records (CLLP 64204). Their first album, Glad Rags & Body Bags, was released in 2005 on German Horrorpunk label, Fiend Force Records (FF-033). The song Girl U Want received the most airplay on National Australian radio station Triple J from this album, with a ranking of 7763.

=== Dealing the Death Card ===
Dealing the Death Card was the second and final studio album by Zombie Ghost Train. It was released on 19 May 2007 on Resist Records in Australia and in Germany on Fiend Force Records. The band launched this album during an Australian tour between May and June 2007.

=== Reformation and final shows ===
The original lineup of Stu, Reckless and Azzy T toured with Tiger Army in March 2008 playing shows in Brisbane, Sydney, Adelaide, and Melbourne. The final ZGT show was at Sydney's Oxford Art Factory on 24 April 2008.

The band announced their breakup on 26 April 2009 on their Myspace blog. Their logo can be spotted on the leather jacket of an extra in the film Harry Potter and the Deathly Hallows – Part 1.

=== 20th Anniversary Reunion ===
In 2025, it was announced that the band would return after a decade to celebrate the 20th anniversary of their debut album Glad Rags & Body Bags, Friday, the 31st of October for Halloween at the Factory Theatre.

== Members ==
- Stu Arkoff (a.k.a. Stuart Hibberd) – vocals, guitar, theremin
- Captain Reckless (a.k.a. Aaron Mol) – slap bass, backing vocals
- AzzA-T (a.k.a. Aaron James Trew) – drums, percussion
- JM

Credits:

== Discography ==
=== Albums ===
- Glad Rags & Body Bags (19 April 2004) – Shrunken Head Records/MGM Distribution (SHRCD00002)

Track listing

1. Glad Rags & Body Bags (1:38)
2. R.I.P.(3:12)
3. Dark Times (3:09)
4. Graveyard Queen (3:18)
5. Black White and Dead (2:51)
6. Deadcat Rumble (3:28)
7. Girl U Want (2:42)
8. Alone (4:06)
9. Night Time Crawling (3:27)
10. Zombie Beach (1:09)
11. Gone (3:12)
12. Buried Next to the King (3:23)
13. You're My Baby (6:51)
- Dealing the Death Card (19 May 2007) Resist Records (RES061)

Track listing

1. Step into My Coffin (2:43)
2. Mystery Woman (3:00)
3. Bats in the Belfry (2:30)
4. 13 Tears (3:43)
5. The Big Fog (2:20)
6. Monster Rock'n'Roll (2:52)
7. Teddy Boy Boogie (3:03)
8. Dealing the Death Card (3:56)
9. To the River (3:03)
10. The Undead Sea (2:11)
11. Long Dark Night (3:16)
12. Trouble (4:08)
13. Dead End Crew (2:59)

=== Extended plays ===
- Monster Formal Wear (2003) Shrunken Head Records (SHR-CD00001)

Track listing

1. A1 - On The Line
2. A2 - Devil Child
3. A3 - In The Shadows
4. B1 - Go-Go Mummy
5. B2 - Mad Mummy Daddy
6. B3 - Twenty Flight Rock
7. B4 - Blue Moon of Kentucky

== See also ==
- List of psychobilly bands
