= Nitkie =

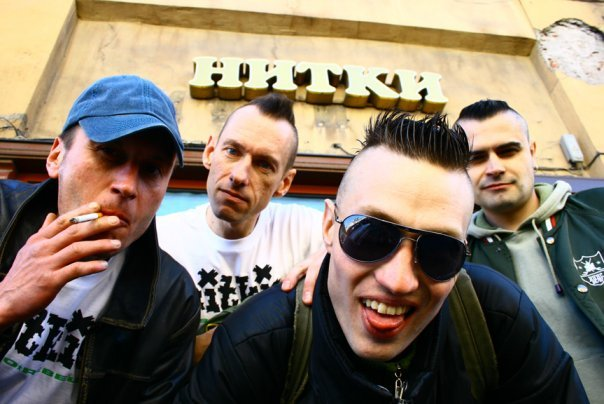
- Nitkie (Saint-Petersburg stuff)

Background information
- Genres: psychobilly / hardcore punk / cowpunk / garage punk
- Years active: 1996-2014
- Label: Kap-Kan Rec.
- Website: http://www.myspace.com/nitkie

Nitkie [ˈnitki] is a Belarusian psychobilly band, now based in Saint-Petersburg, Russia. The band is first and only psychobilly band in Belarus, and it is one of the most known psychobilly bands of the post-Soviet space.

== Career ==
Nitkie was formed in 1996 in the city of Vitebsk, Belarus and is the first and only psychobilly group in Belarus, playing psychobilly which has received popularity in the post-Soviet space and abroad. The original members of the band were:

- Sergei "Des" Dosuzhev - guitars
- Maxim "Moped" Zhukov - vocals, drums
- Vladimir "Usy" Zaitsev - bass

Right after creation of the first concert program in 1996, Nitkie start to go on tour actively, participate in republican competitions and telecasts. In 1999, the first concert outside of Belarus, in Moscow has taken place. Warm reception of the Moscow psychobilly fans has charged energy of members of the band for a long time, and on arrival back to Vitebsk has been written down EP "ХХХ", including three toothscratching hits. In 2000 and 2001, Nitkie band periodically acts in Russia and participated in the following compilation albums:

- CD High Voltage 2-3 (Black Sky Rec., Germany)
- CD Psychoburg. The Happy End (Kap-Кan Rec., Russia)
- CD Klaustrofobia (Aist Rec., Belarus)
- CD The Russian Punk Bombardment – 2 (NeuroEmpire Rec., Russia)
- CD Psychobilly Frenzy (Downer Rec., Japan)
- MC Blow Up This Town, vol. 1 (BUTT Rec., Belarus)

In March 2003, on a Petersburg label of Kap-Kan Records the debut album which has received the name "Twelve Radio Knives" is released. It has 12 compositions one of which - Nitkie Is Here - was devoted to the company of adherents Moscow psychobilly crew. In 2005, the Russian label FCR (St.-Petersburg) has let out the second LP of Nitkie Rita Gerro’s Head. The CD includes new tunes, covers, a remix from dj Zhukov and the cover-version of a song of Batmobile (band) published in Japan on the worldwide compilation Tribute To Batmobile, vol. 2. The edition had a multimedia bonus with texts of songs, the additional information and five videoclips including two short movies of Kings of Saspens independent film group. The recording of the album has been made at studio BUTT records.

In 2003, the leader of band Sergei Dosuzhev decides to replace a constant residence and moves in Saint-Petersburg (Russia). At last, after long searches of musicians, in 2007 it completes new stuff of Nitkie band:

- Alexander "Skorp" Prokopyev - vocal, shouts, whisper
- Anton "sXe" Sutjagin - electric bass
- Victor "Diktor" Solinin - drums, plates, cries
- Sergei "Des" Dosuzhev - electric guitar

At that moment the band actively goes on tour (performing with recognized stars of the psychobilly and punk scenes, including Mad Dog Cole (former The Krewmen) (Great Britain), Stringbeans (Finland), Goathead (Scotland), The Meantraitors (Russia), The Pauki (Russia)...) and prepares for record the new CD under the working name "Disco Rebels".

== Breakup ==
In 2013, the group officially disbanded due to creative differences in the team. As a result, the group fell apart into two projects - Fraggles (led by Alexander Prokopiev), which exist to this day, and Watusi Machine(Dosuzhev's surf-project), which existed for only about a year. The planned CD "Disco Rebel" remained unfinished, remaining at the mixing stage...

In 2014, a cover version of "We Fly Together Fly My Life" was recorded for a tribute to The Meantraitors with the vocals of the former vocalist Maxim Zhukov and with all the instrument parts played by Dosuzhev. To date, this is the last released song of the Nitkie band.

== Style ==
Musically, Nitkie's style is rooted in the psychobilly, punk and experimental genres (they like to play with rhythm dimensions), but their songs also contain elements of ska, hardcore and surf music. At times, the band uses Hammond organ, while at other times, the band chooses to use the guitar, bass, and acoustic drum configuration characteristic of rock music. The band also utilizes keyboards in much of its music.

Lyrically, the band utilizes horror-romantic and/or suspense themes that focus heavily on vivid imagery. The band's verses are inspired by classic horror and Alfred Hitchcock's movies and the art of German expressionism.

== Discography ==
=== Albums ===
1. "Demo-n Tape", MC, 1998
2. "ХХХ", EP, 1999
3. "Twelve Radio Knives", LP, 2002
4. "Rita Gerro's Head", LP, 2005
5. "Crazy Sound", EP, 2022 (recorded in 2012)
6. "Almost Dead", EP, 2023 (recorded in 2012)
7. "Alive From The End", LP, 2023 (recorded in 2012)

=== Compilations ===
1. "High Voltage", 2000 Black Sky Rec. Germany ("No Head" song)
2. "Psychoburg", 2000, KapKan Rec. ("No Head" song)
3. "Russian Punk Cannonade 2", 2001 Neuro Rec. Russia ("Movie Legend Crash" song )
4. "Psychobilly Frenzy", 2001 Downer Rec. Japan ("Movie Legend Crash", "No Head" songs)
5. "A Tribute to Batmobile", 2004 On The Hill Rec. Japan ("Sweet Love on My Mind" song)
6. "Fresh Blood Of Russian Psychobilly", 2009 Russia ("Disco Rebel" song)
7. "Lunatic Rampage + Wake The Dead", 2011 Crazy Rat Rec. Russia ("Crazy Sound", "Wolfshade" songs)
8. "Psychobilly Outlaws - A Tribute To Meantraitors", 2014 Rude Runner Records Japan ("We Fly Together Fly My Life" song)
