= The Hangmen (British band) =

British psychobilly punk rock band

- Origin: North East England
- Genres: Punk; Rock; Rock & Roll; Psychobilly; Rockabilly; Horror Punk
- Years active: 1991–present
- Members: Loz Firewalker - Guitar/Voc. Mav A. Cadaver - Double Bass/Voc. Blaxxi Graves - Drums
- Past members: Mark 'Spoony' Windebank (Drums) Jamie 'Hell Burns' Cottam (Drums)
- Website: The Hangmen Website (also has links to social media)

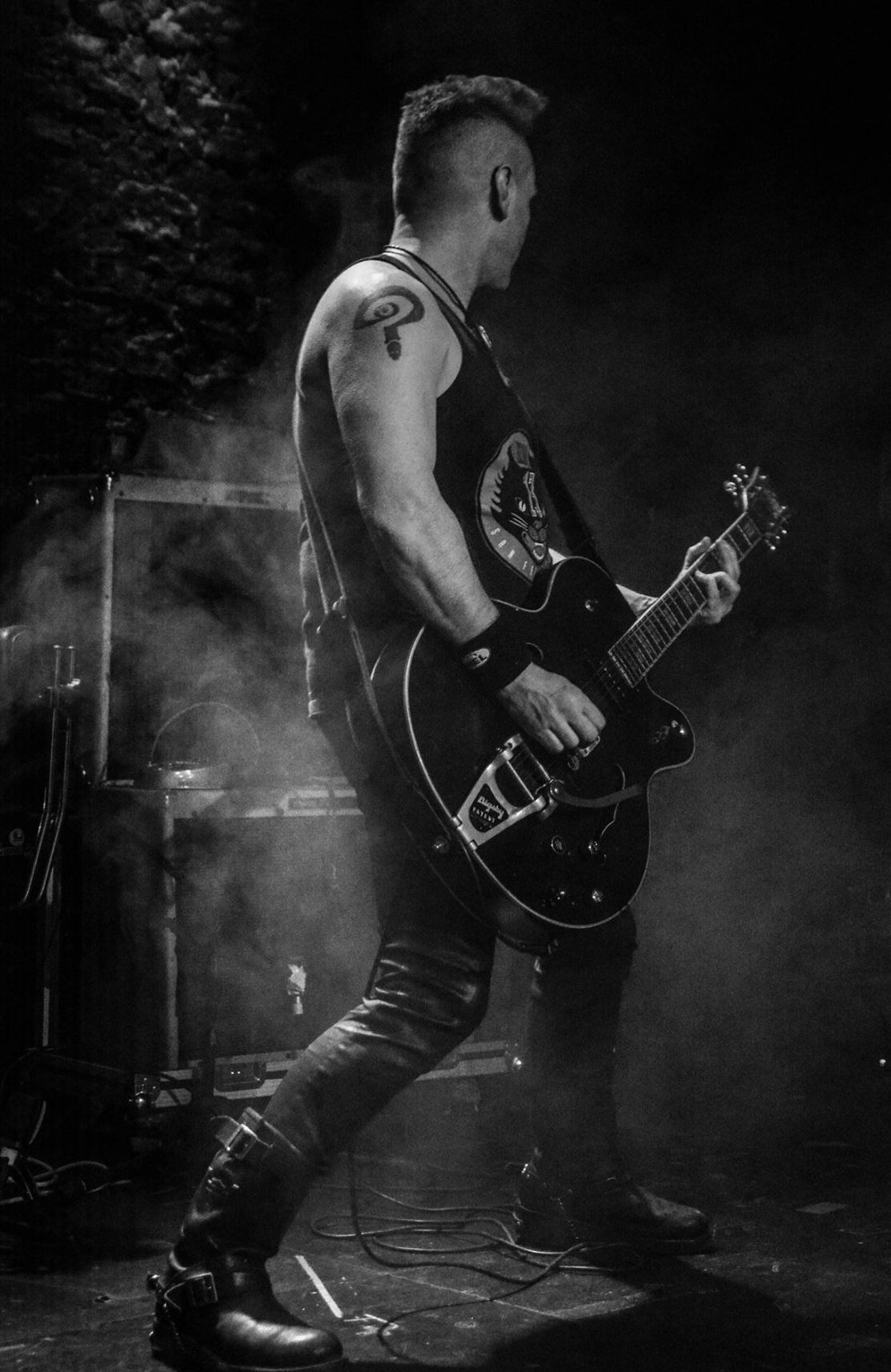
Loz Firewalker playing live in The Hangmen.

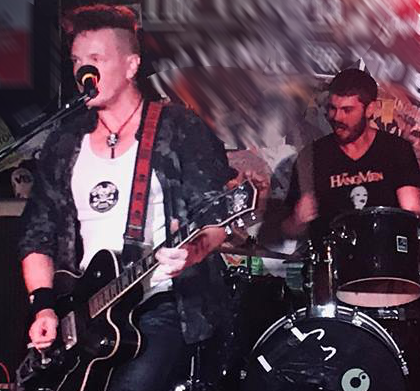
The Hangmen guitarist and drummer live.

The Hangmen are a three-piece band from the north-east of England who play their own compositions. Musically they are a punk-rockabilly hybrid often categorised as 'psychobilly', with dark and often dramatic lyrics.

The instrumentation is vocals, guitar, double bass and drums.

== Recordings ==
To date they have released nine albums, one of these Play Dead being a live concert recording, another Exhumed & Groomed being a collection of rarities and the rest being studio albums. They have also released two 7-inch EPs, a 10-inch EP, a split 7-inch single and a download single. A 12" picture disc EP accompanied the vinyl album release of No Happy Endings. They have appeared on eighteen compilation albums, one of which was a covermount on Big Cheese Magazine.

== Features ==
They were prominently featured in the book about the 'Psychobilly' movement Hell's Bent On Rocking by Craig Brackenridge and have appeared in cinematic documentaries such as New York Rumble (US) and The Story Of Psychobillies (DE) as well as Live From the Charlotte (UK) which showcased bands performing live at a festival in Leicester, England.

== Live ==
Their live activities have included many festivals and repeated tours internationally across countries which include The UK, US, Canada, The Netherlands, Russia, Germany, France, Finland, Spain, Hungary, Austria, Czechia, Slovenia, Croatia and Belgium.

== Personnel ==
- Loz Firewalker (Guitar, Lead Vocals)
- Mav A. Cadaver (Double bass, Backing Vocals)
- Blaxxi Graves (Drums)

== Discography ==
=== Albums ===
Title
Debauchery In The Mortuary	2023	CD Version: Mortuary Records - ToeTag13
Debauchery In The Mortuary	2023	Vinyl Version: Crazy Love Records - CLLP64498
Exhumed & Groomed	2014	Mortuary Records - ToeTag008
Cacklefest!	2007	Abattoir Records - AB0701
Play Dead	2004	Tombstone Records - TOMBCD2062
No Happy Endings	2001	CD Version: Ripper Records - RiP1888
No Happy Endings	2001	Vinyl Version (+ 12" Pic. EP): P&P Records - PP004
Original Sins	2000	Crazy Love Records - CLCD6490
Tested on Animals	2022	Vinyl Version: Wreckin' Bones WBR030
Tested on Animals	1998	CD Version: Bone Tone Corp. - BTCD981
Last Train to Purgatory	2021	Vinyl Version: Wreckin' Bones WBR017
Last Train to Purgatory	1995	CD Version: Bone Tone Corp. - BTCD951
Gutbucket Rock N'Roll	1991	Rockhouse Records

=== EPs and singles ===
Title
"Necronomicon EP"	2017	Hang10
"Bad Blood 12" Picture Disc EP"	2004	Pure & Proud
"Slaughterhouse Strut 7" Shared EP"	1997	Covermount
"Rock & Roll Freakshow EP"	2002	Jet13
"Spring Heeled Jack EP"	2002	Dislocate Records
"True Hate Never Dies"	2018	DL Single
"Hellriders On The Wall Of Death"	2025	DL Single

== See also ==
- List of psychobilly bands
- punk rock bands
