= Klingonz =

Irish psychobilly band

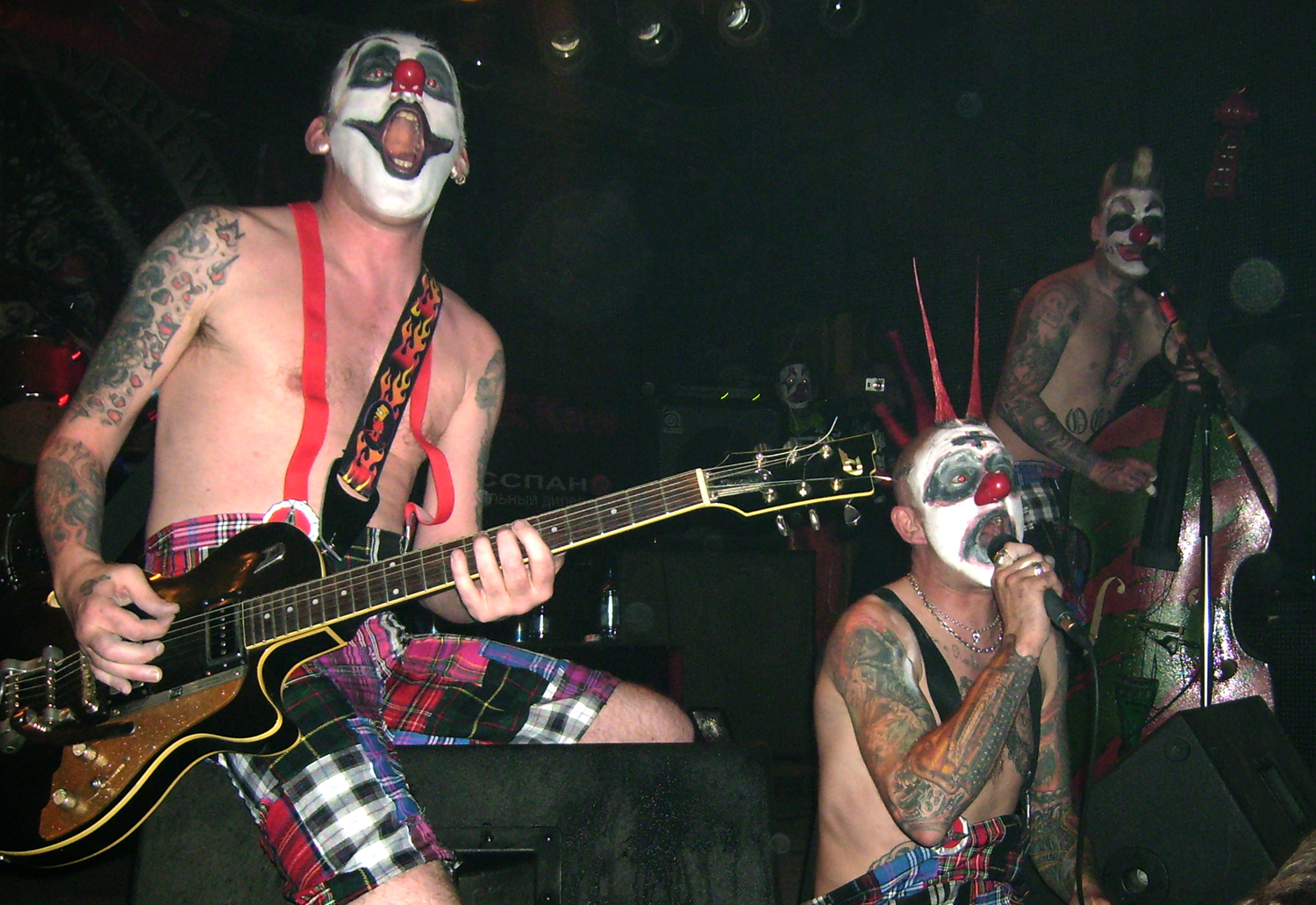
- Klingonz performing in Russia in 2008.

Background information
- Genres: Psychobilly
- Years active: 1988–present
- Labels: Fury; Crazy Love; Ringsting
- Members: Titch; Ray; Shakes; Dave; OP; Erno
- Past members: Eddie; Strangy; Doyley; Mocker; Mick Carroll; Pasi; Grim

Klingonz are an Irish psychobilly band formed in 1988, in Dublin. Their original line-up had Doyley on lead vocals and bass, Willo playing guitar and Mocker on drums. In 1988 in London Strangy played bass Strangy joined Numbskulls. Mick of Phantom Rockers would later replace Doyley on Guitar. In 1998 this line-up recorded an EP entitled The Mad are Sane under the name Looper.

Doyley and Strangy went on to form Celtic Bones.

The band reformed with the original line-up in 2001 and continues to tour and record. In summer 2009 Doyley hacked it and left the band. Dave Deville joined on guitar in 2009, also Ray joined on Double Bass mid 2014.

== Discography ==
=== Albums ===
- Psycho's From Beyond (1988, Fury records/2001, Crazy Love records)
- Ghastly Things (1990 - Rumble Records)
- Blurb (1990, Fury records)
- Mong (1990, Fury records)
- Flange (1991, Fury records)
- Jobot (1992, Fury records)
- Bollox (1994, Fury records)
- Up Uranus (2003, Crazy Love records)
- Klownz'R'us (Junho 2016 - Drunkabilly Records)
- Unmakeupable (2024, Wreckin´Bones Records)

=== Singles & EPs ===
- Lost In Space (2003, Ring Sting records)

=== Compilations ===
- The Best of Klingonz (1995, Fury records)
- 20 Years...Still Stompin' (2007, Ring Sting records, 2024 Captain Spunk records)
- Destructocock (2024 Captain Spunk Records)
