= The Chop Tops =

American rockabilly group

- Origin: Santa Cruz, California, United States
- Genres: Rockabilly, psychobilly, punk, surf, Teddy Boy, rock and roll
- Years active: 1995–2025
- Members: Sinner; Shelby; Brett Black
- Past members: Flyin' Brian (guitar); Rockin' Drew (drums); Ray "Gun" (bass); Dylan "The Man" Cavaliere (bass); T.K. (bass); Hotrod (bass); Josh (bass); K.C. (bass)
- Website: www.thechoptops.com

The Chop Tops are a rockabilly trio from Santa Cruz, California consisting of Sinner (vocals/standing drums), Shelby (guitar), and Brett Black (upright bass). The band was formed by Sinner in 1995, Shelby joined in 1999, and Brett came aboard in 2008. The band coined the phrase "Revved-Up Rockabilly" to describe their wild, upbeat blend of rockabilly, psychobilly, old punk, teddy boy, and surf music genres. The Chop Tops headlined their own national tours, toured with bands like Mad Sin and the Nekromantix, and opened for many bands, including the Dead Kennedys, Suicidal Tendencies, Dick Dale, John Lee Hooker, and Chuck Berry.

Other accomplishments included having three of their songs featured in the video game WET, performing at several Warped Tours, and many years of playing the annual rockabilly festival Viva Las Vegas. In April 2012, the band made their first international tour appearing at dates across Australia (they were asked back and returned for another Australian tour in June 2013). The Chop Tops were sponsored by Murray's Pomade. Murray's has sponsored only two bands in its 90-year history, the Stray Cats and the Chop Tops. The group was also sponsored and endorsed by Gretsch guitars, Jim Dunlop, and T.U.K. shoes.

The Chop Tops made their final appearance on April 3, 2015, at the 18th annual Viva Las Vegas Rockabilly Weekender. The band was joined by guest performers Chantilly Lace Vincent (granddaughter of Gene Vincent) and Mario Valens (Ritchie Valens' younger brother).

The band reunited in 2024 and began working on their 8th studio album entitled "Fabrikate". It was released on January 1st 2025. They announced they would be playing major selected cities across the US starting in April. The last two shows of this reunion tour ended with back to back shows in their hometown of Santa Cruz, CA in December 2025.

== Discography ==
- Revved-Up Rockabilly (1997) Swillbilly Music
- Tales of Hot Rods, Hot Broads & Lucky Odds! (1999) Swillbilly Music, Producer: Deke Dickerson
- Always Wild (2000) Rollin' Rock Records
- Evil Six (2001) Swillbilly Music
- Triple Deuces (2006) Split 7 Records
- Deadly Love (2010) Swillbilly Music, Producer & Assistant Engineer: Kim Nekroman, Mastered by Maor Appelbaum
- Evil Six: Revisited (2012) Swillbilly Music
- Fabrikate - Released Jan 2025 - Swillbilly Music

=== Compilation albums ===
- Good Rockin’ Tonight! Volumes I & II (2000) Purist Records
- Someday Coming Down: A Deviant Twang Sampler (2004) Warning Sign Records
- Hicks with Sticks – A Town North Of Bakersfield (2005) Cracked Piston Recordings
- Return Of The Hot Rod Zombies (2005) Split 7 Records
- Clash of The Billys Rumble #1 (2007) Terror .45 Records
- Revenge Of The Hot Rod Zombies (2008) Boss Beat
- Rebels of Rock 'N' Roll, Vol. 1 (2008) Straight Razor Records
- Rebels of Rock N Roll No. 2 (2009) Straight Razor Records

== Film appearance ==
- Flying Saucer Rock 'N' Roll (2006)
