= The Quakes =

American psychobilly band

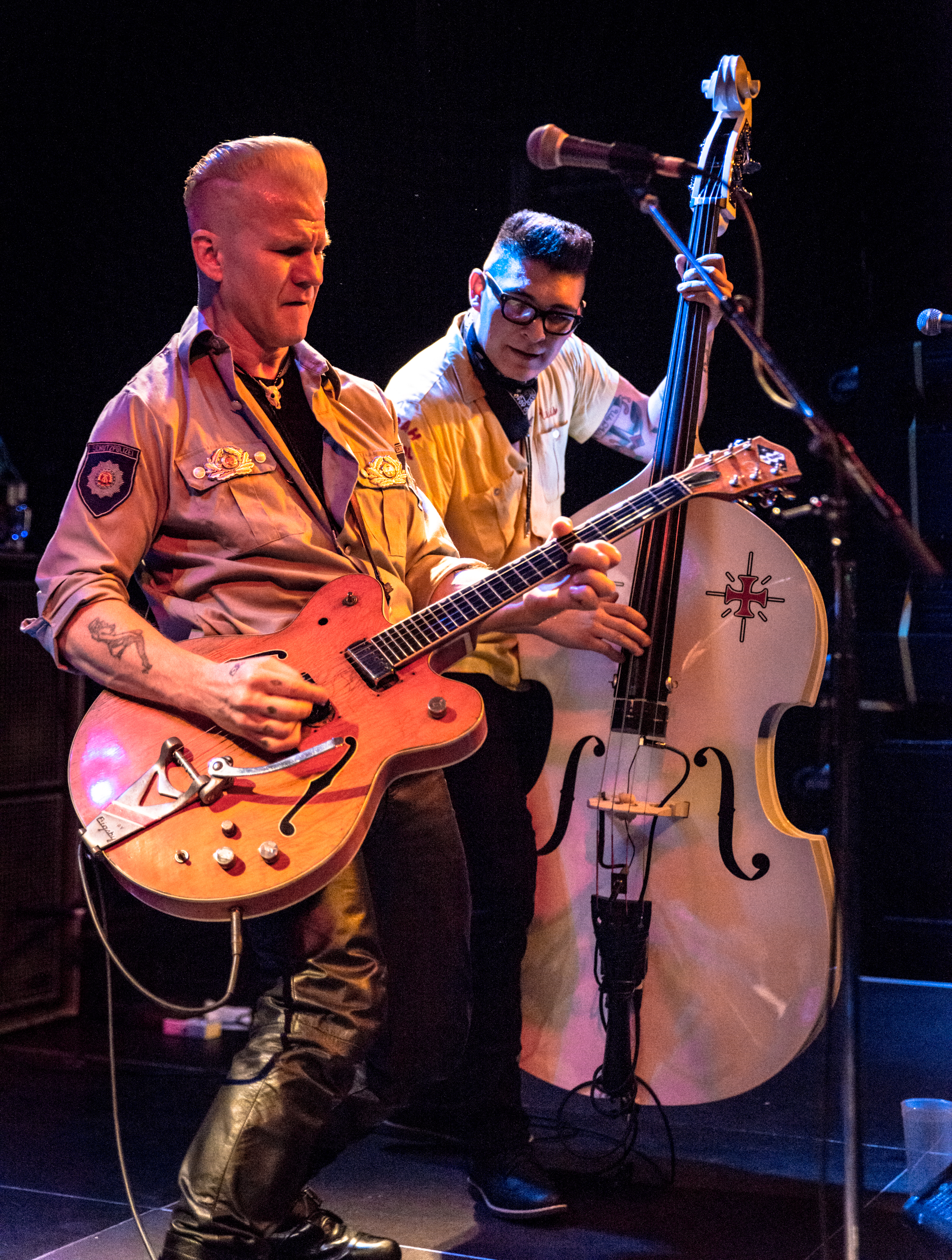
- Live in Feierwerk, 2014

Background information
- Origin: Buffalo, New York, U.S.
- Genre: psychobilly
- Years active: 1986-present
- Members: Paul Roman; Wes Hinshaw; Juan Carlos
- Past members: Rob Peltier; Dave "The Ace" Hoy; Chris Van Cleve; Brian Doran; Kenny Hill
- Website: http://www.thequakes.com

The Quakes are an American psychobilly band from Buffalo, New York, United States. They were formed in 1986. When the band began in the late 1980s, there was no psychobilly scene to speak of in the United States. The Quakes moved to London to try to find an audience.

== 1980s ==
The Quakes were started by Paul Roman (guitar, vocals), Rob Peltier (upright slap bass), and Dave "The Ace" Hoy (drums) in the fall of 1986. After visiting London twice in attempts to start a band in 1985 and again in 1986, Roman continued a band he had with Hoy called the Quiffs. Peltier later saw the band playing at a party, and once he joined, the band's name was changed to the Quakes.

The band originally played modern rockabilly, but found it tough to book shows with Buffalo's teenage music scene being dominated by hardcore punk.The band began playing faster and dressing in ripped jeans and combat boots instead of their usual peg pants. While they did gain a following, it was small compared to the attention European psychobilly bands were getting.

In the fall of 1987, the Quakes decided to move to London in order to become part of the European scene. Once in London, they looked for gigs and contacted Nervous Records. They were told another band, the Rattlers, had cancelled out of a psychobilly fest in Weize, Belgium, and they could have the slot. The band was able to play for an audience of 4000 for their very first European gig. Upon returning to England, the band was stopped at the border and deported because they did not have work permits. The band were soon able to return to Europe when they were offered a slot as an opening band for the Coffin Nails on a tour of Belgium and Germany. Before the tour, Rob Peltier quit the band, and was replaced with Chris VanCleve, who had played drums in the Quiffs. VanCleve was put on drums, and Dave Hoy was switched to bass.

After the tour, the band was signed by Nervous Records to record the first album. Peltier was convinced by the record deal to rejoin. Peltier moved to London, and the band was living in a squat. The Quakes began playing around London, and made their debut at legendary psychobilly club, the Klubfoot, on June 4, 1988. The last half of 1988 saw the release of their self-titled debut, The Quakes,[1] For the recording Roy Williams of Nervous Records teamed the band with producer Paul "Doc" Stewart, who chose to record and mix the tracks at Opaz Studio in Hackney, in East London. Stewart also co-engineered the album and shot the cover pictures using the nom de plume of Stewart Barker for the photo credit. Peltier and Hoy ended up quitting and returning to Buffalo after a planned tour of Europe offered by “Doc” Stewart, failed to materialize. Roman stayed in London and began a new band, Paul Roman and the Prowlers, with the Rattlers' bassist Nick Peck. Shortly after returning to Buffalo, Dave Hoy was struck by a car while crossing the highway and killed a week before his 18th birthday.

The Prowlers played a few shows in London and a small psychobilly festival in Belgium. Upon returning to London, Paul Roman was deported to the US for the second time. As soon as Paul Roman returned to Buffalo, the Quakes were put back together for a few gigs just for fun with Rob Peltier on upright bass, Chris VanCleve on rhythm guitar, and one of Peltier's friends on drums. Paul Roman returned to England, this time with a work permit, but found that his plans with a record label had fallen through to record a solo record. By chance Paul met Ant Thomas, a member of English psychobilly band Demented Are Go, in a laundromat and learned they lived in the same neighbourhood. Demented Are Go's guitarist, Lex, had just quit the band, and Paul Roman joined to fill in on Demented Are Go's already booked tour of England.

In the fall of 1989, Paul Roman moved back to Buffalo. He rented an apartment with Peltier, and they decided to continue with the Quakes again. Chris VanCleve was invited back on drums, but he was replaced with Brian Doran, one of Peltier's friends from high school. The Quakes celebrated their newest reformation by playing the first and second Big Rumble, a renowned England-based psychobilly festival, and doing a few small tours of Europe.

== 1990s ==
On January 1, 1992, the Quakes released their second record, Voice of America [engineered by Robbie Takac of the Goo Goo Dolls]. In the spring of 1991, the Quakes planned to appear at a large festival in Germany and go on tour, but Brian Doran was unable to go, resulting in Chris VanCleve returning to the band. In the next few months, the Quakes went on tour in Japan based on their strong record sales for an independent band. First, the Quakes recorded a live album from Tokyo with Planet Records, then were signed by the Japanese division of Sony Records with plans for a new album and a large Japanese tour.

New Generation, the band's next album, was recorded in 1992 and released in March 1993. The album featured some production by Tim Polecat. It was followed with a 13 stop tour of Japan and strong Japanese record sales. However, New Generation was closer to a pop-rockabilly sound than a psychobilly sound, and was poorly received by the band's European fans. Chris VanCleve quit the band again after the Japanese tour.

The band released their fourth album, Quiff Rock, in 1996. This album marked a return to a psychobilly sound and minimalistic production. They played a few festivals, but still could not find a permanent drummer. Paul Roman moved to Phoenix, AZ and Rob Peltier joined a new band, the Irving Klaws. In 1998, the Quakes decided to only play one or two festivals a year rather than touring and recording extensively.

== 2000s ==
The Quakes played at the American Rumble festival in New Jersey on Halloween 2000. In October 2001, the Quakes released a new full-length, Last of the Human Beings. This marked their first release on Paul Roman’s new record label, Orrexx Records. They spent 2002 and 2003 doing a series of shows and festivals around the US including headlining the American Nightmare festival in Pomona California. Other shows included trips to Germany, Spain, and Finland.

In February 2004, Paul Roman moved to Helsinki, Finland. He began doing solo shows as The Paul Roman 3. This band mostly played Quakes songs. They did a 25 show European tour in the summer of 2004. In October 2004, the Quakes headlined the Wreckers' Ball 2 in Pomona California. Roman returned to Finland in November, and put together the new Paul Roman 3, which featured Aki Savolainen on bass and Tommi Hanninen on drums. The band had a successful tour of Ukraine in January 2005.

In April 2005, the Quakes toured France, Belgium, and Germany. In June 2005, The Quakes toured the southwest United States and Japan in September 2005. In December 2005, The Quakes released the album "Psyops" on Orrexx records. The album combined psychobilly with new wave and was recorded in Finland, Las Vegas and Phoenix.

In 2006, the Quakes celebrated their 20-year anniversary. They did a 34-show tour of the US and then 23 more shows all across Europe and Russia.

In 2007, Orrexx records re-released the album Quiff Rock after obtaining the rights back from Tombstone records. The re-release added eight extra songs, seven of which had been unreleased. The Quakes added Kenny Hill on slap bass. The band did a short tour of the southwest in September and then a 28 show tour all over Europe.

In 2008, The Quakes added drummer Juan Carlos who also played in The Limit Club. The band headlined the Psychomania festival in Potsdam Germany on May 10.

In 2009, The Quakes put out a new album titled "Negative Charge” on Orrexx records. They did a 20 show west coast tour starting with a sold out show in Hollywood at The Fonda theater. Following a trip to Germany to play a festival, The Quakes did the"Negative Charge" East coast tour.

In 2010, The Quakes headlined the Psychobilly Meeting, a long running festival in Spain and also headlined the Rock n Roll Jamboree in Finland. In July, The Quakes made their first trip to Brazil. They were featured on a national television show as well as a radio interview and an article in Rolling Stone magazine/Brazil. In September, the band headlined the Bedlam Breakout festival in the UK. In October, The Quakes did a series of warm up shows around Arizona before heading to Europe for a 10 country, 21 show tour to promote the vinyl release of Negative Charge.

In 2011, Paul Roman and Kenny Hill recorded a cover version of Duran Durans’s “Planet Earth” for a compilation album on Cleopatra Records.

In 2012 The Quakes welcomed Wes Hinshaw in on bass taking over for Kenny Hill. On May 10 the new album Planet Obscure was released on Orrexx Records. Later that year, The Quakes played at the Ink & Iron festival in Long beach California as well as the Psychobilly Meeting in Pineda, Spain. A European tour started in September 2012 taking The Quakes to 13 countries for a total of 31 shows to promote Planet Obscure. During the tour, The Quakes headlined The Psychobilly Earthquake festival in Bremen Germany.

In May 2013, The Quakes headlined The Psychomania festival in Potsdam, Germany. In December, The Quakes returned to Brazil for a show in Curitiba and Sao Paulo.

In September 2014, The Quakes headlined the Long Beach Psyclone festival in Long Beach California. A new Ep called “Live By The Sword” was also released on Orrexx records that same month. A European tour followed in October taking The Quakes to 13 countries in 4 weeks including headlining the Psychobilly Earthquake festival in Bremen Germany.

In 2015 The Quakes were one of the headliners at the Psychobilly meeting festival in Spain.

In 2016 The Quakes celebrated their 30 year anniversary by playing shows in Phoenix, San Diego, Los Angeles and a trip to Northampton, England to headline the Bedlam Breakout festival.

In June 2017, a documentary was made by Paul Roman chronicling the band's early days and was released on YouTube. The digital single “Psycho fest” was also released. In October, The Quakes headlined the Tawastia Stomp in Finland.

The new single “Winter Drag” was released in January 2018. A video for the song was shot in Flagstaff AZ. In April, The Quakes played in Las Vegas and then headlined the Mayhem festival in Los Angeles. In July, they were one of the headliners at the Psychobilly meeting in Spain.

In 2019, The Quakes played in St.Petersburg and Moscow, Russia. It was the first time the band had played there in 13 years.

== Discography ==
- The Quakes (Nervous Records) - 1988
- Voice of America (Nervous Records) - 1990
- Live in Tokyo (Planet Records, Nervous Records) - 1991
- New Generation (Sony Japan, Nervous Records) - 1993
- Quiff Rock (Tombstone Records) - 1996
- Last of the Human Beings (Orrexx Records) - 2001
- Psyops (Orrexx Records) - 2005
- Quiff Rock (Orrexx Records) - 2007
- Negative Charge (Orrexx Records) - 2009
- Planet Obscure (Orrexx Records) - 2012
- "Live By The Sword" (Orrexx Records) - 2014
- ”Western Bop” (?) - 2024
