= Guana Batz =

English psychobilly band

The Guana Batz are an English psychobilly band who formed in 1982 in Feltham, West London, England.

== History ==
The original group members were Pip Hancox (vocals), Stuart Osborne (guitar), Dave "Diddle" Turner (drums) and Mick Wigfall (upright bass). Wigfall was removed by Osborne early on, who preferred a bass guitar player for the band. Mick White soon joined the band as bass guitarist. However, by 1984, the Guana Batz decided to again feature an upright bassist, and replaced White with Sam Sardi.

== See also ==
- List of psychobilly bands
