= Mad Sin =

German psychobilly band

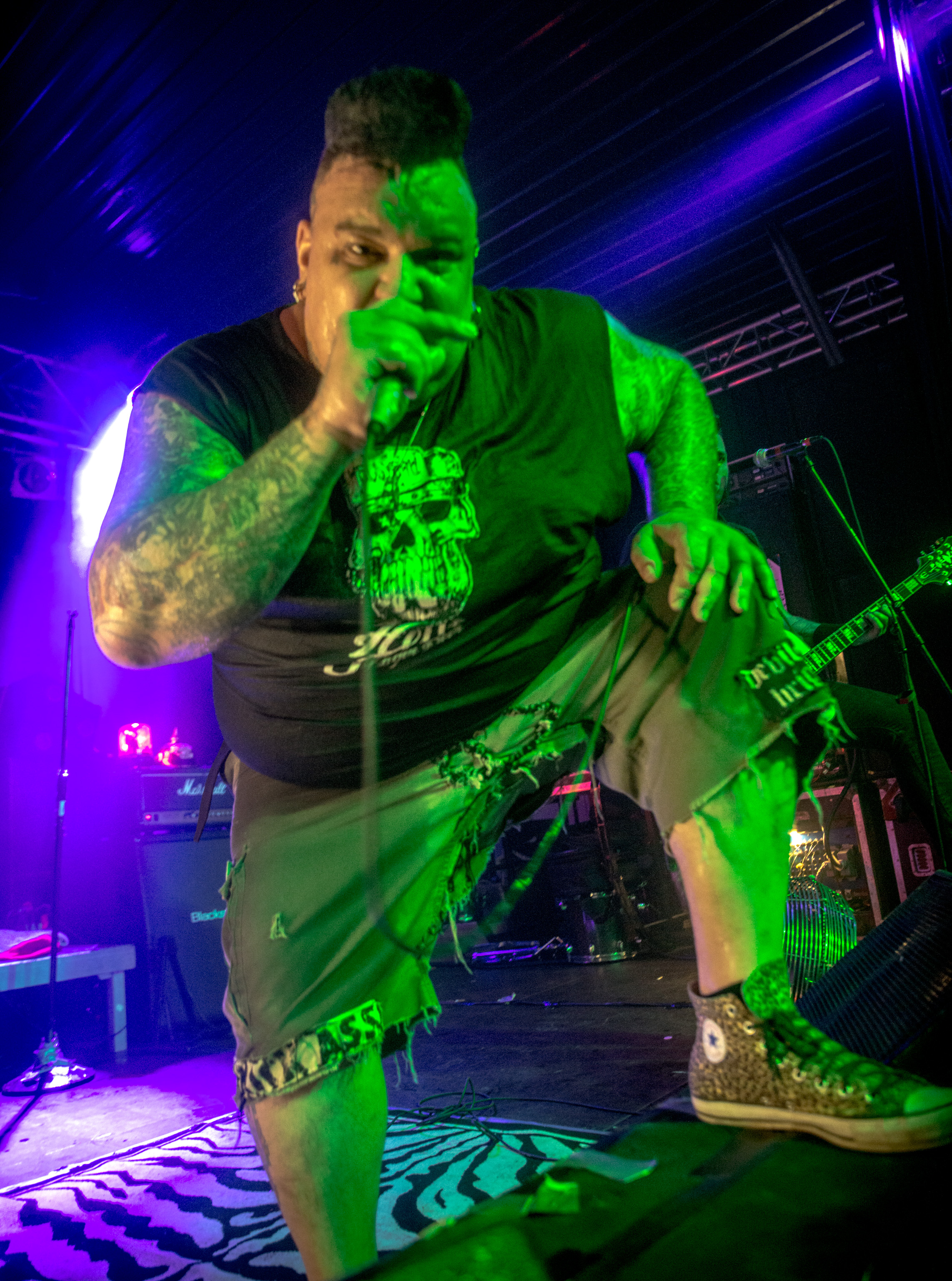
- Mad Sin performing 2014 at Free & Easy Festival

Background information
- Genres: Psychobilly, punk rock
- Years active: 1987–present
- Label: peoplelikeyou
- Members: Koefte deVille; Manny Anzaldo; Andy Kandil; Valle; KO Ristolainen; Hellvis
- Past members: Horst "Holly" Höhne; Thorsten "Stein" Hunaeus; Peter Sandorff; Matt Vüdü; Andy Laaf; Tex Morton
- Website: Madsin.de

Mad Sin is a German psychobilly group that began in 1987.

== Style ==
Mad Sin, formed in 1987, have been inspired by horror punk and B-movies, with a theatrical style which they describe as not "...constrained by the psychobilly tag but veer[ing] into punk, country and metal influences too."

Without abandoning the psycho-horror lyrical content, their musical arrangements have widened to incorporate other variables. The band's style is described by The Prague Post as "a sped-up combination of rockabilly, punk, white-trash blues and tongue-in-cheek sarcasm".

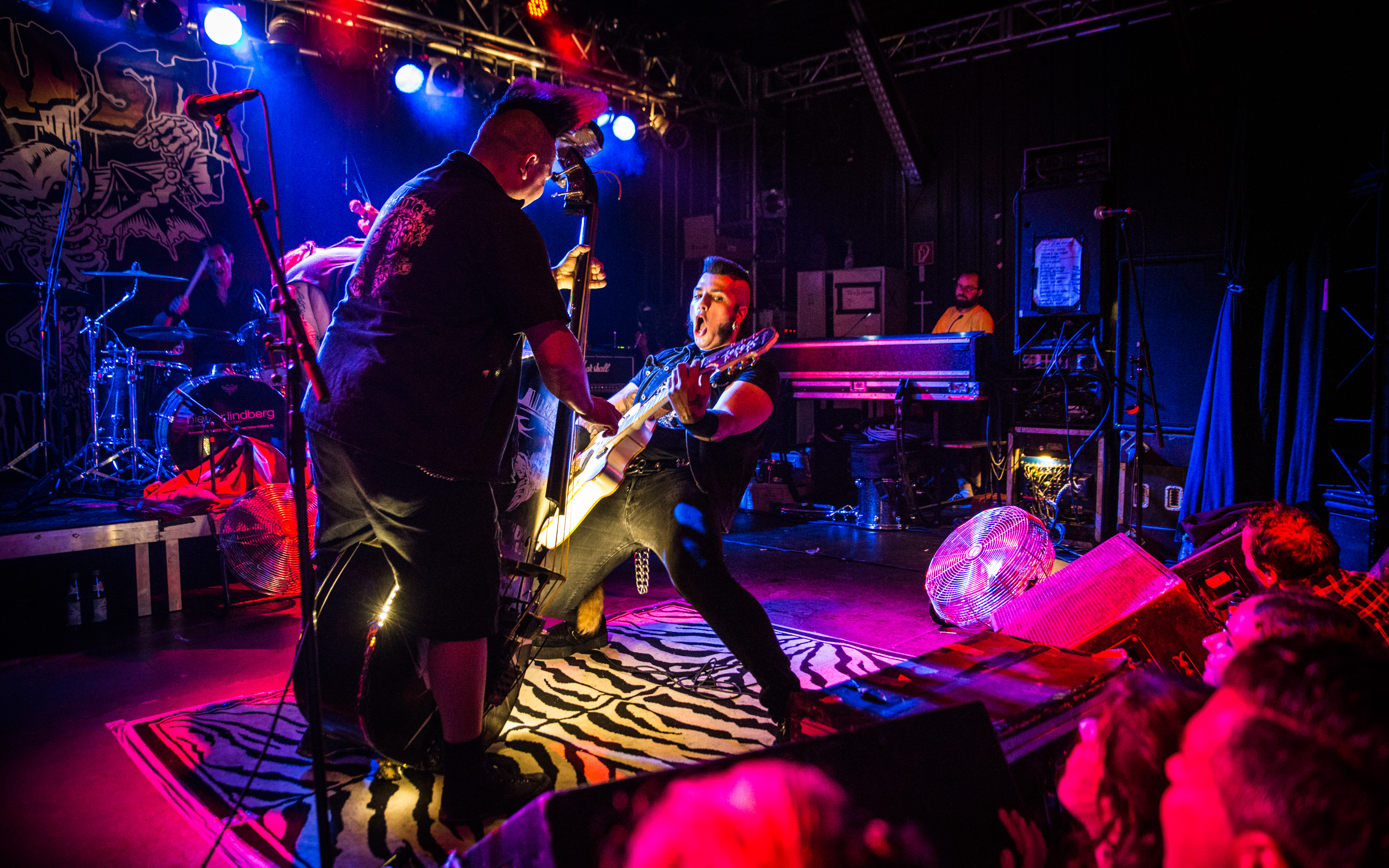
Mad Sin performing 2014 at Free & Easy Festival

== History ==
=== 1980s ===
Founded 1987 by Koefte De Ville, who had just dropped out of school, punk and rockabilly guitarist Stein and four-week-bass-playing Holly, they struggled around with the help of some friends, who organized gigs in several shady bars of Berlin. They played as street musicians in shopping malls, where they played rockabilly, country, and blues songs to get tourists' money.

=== 2010 ===
On April 23, 2010, Mad Sin released their eleventh album Burn and Rise on People Like You records.

=== 2020 ===
On September 11, 2020, Mad Sin released their twelfth album Unbreakable on Century Media.

== Side projects ==
Koefte formed a side project called Dead Kings with members of Batmobile, Nekromantix, Klingonz & Uli of Church of Confidence and Teo of Evil Devil and Scarlet and the Spooky Spiders. Holly, his brother, and Tex followed their Rockabilly roots and Dusty Gray and His Rough Riding Ramblers. Stein joined the United Swindlers with members of Frantic Flintstones and Ripmen. Peter Sandorff is a member of the Psychobilly band Hola Ghost. Valle, Tex Morton and Andy Laaf are the "Berlin Three" of U.S. Bombs and One Man Army Drummer Chip Hanna in his Country/Americana project Chip Hanna & The Berlin Three which Chip started in 2006.

== Members ==
=== Core ===
- Koefte Deville (Birthname: Mourad Calvies) - Vocals
- Valle - Bass and Backing Vocals
- Manny Anzaldo - Guitar and Backing Vocals
- Andy Kandil - Guitar and Backing Vocals
- KO Ristolainen - Drums
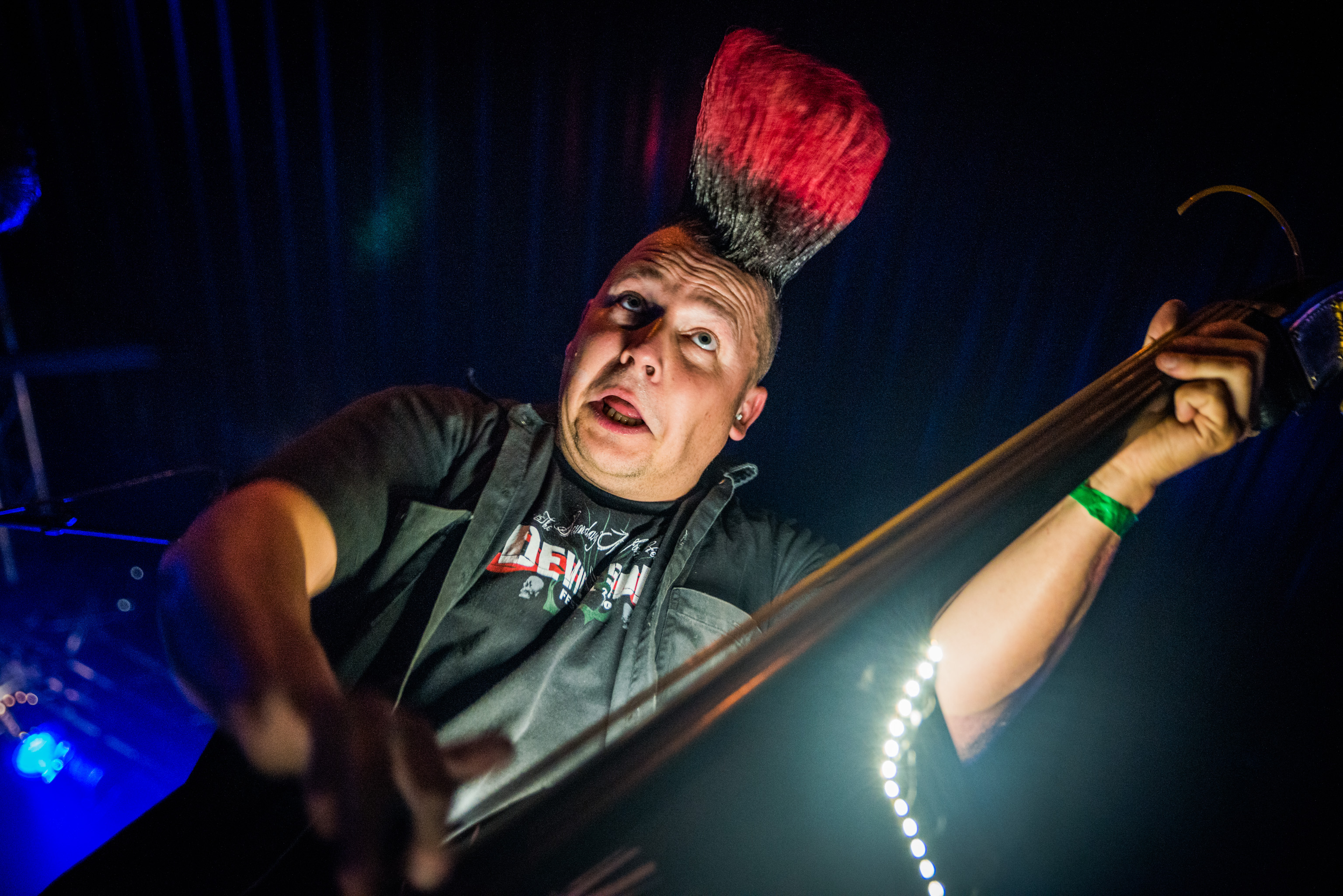
Valle

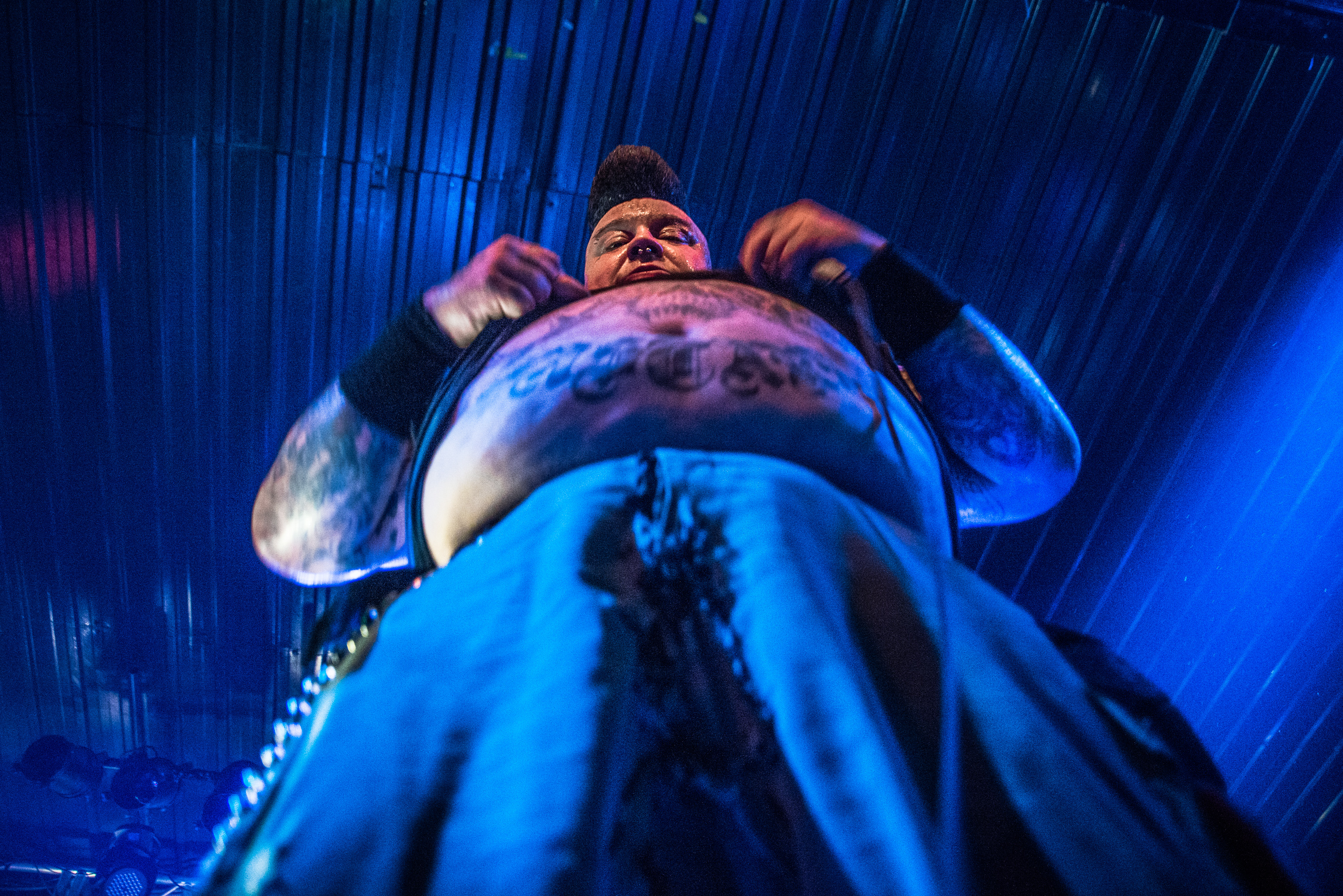
„Köfte“ de Ville

=== Other members ===
- Hellvis - Backing Vocals

=== Guest members ===
- Tommy Gun - Drums
- Micha - Drums
- Nick 13 - Vocals
- Patricia Day - Vocals
- Lars Frederiksen - Vocals
- Hulk Hogan - Vocals ("Brrrother!")

== Albums ==
- Chills and Thrills in a Drama of Mad Sins and Mystery (1988)
- Distorted Dimensions (1990)
- Amphigory (1991)
- Break the Rules (1992)
- A Ticket into Underworld (1993)
- God Save the Sin (1996)
- Sweet & Innocent?... Loud & Dirty! (1998)
- Survival Of The Sickest (2002)
- Dead Moon's Calling (2005)
- Teachin' the Goodies (2006)
- 20 Years in Sin Sin (2007)
- Burn and Rise (2010)
- 25 Years - Still Mad (2012)
- Unbreakable (2020)

== Videography ==
- Scarred ol'heart
- All This and More (1998)
- Cursed (2010)
- Nine lives (2012)
- Mean Machine (2016)
- Moon Over Berlin (2020)
