= The Meteors =

English psychobilly band

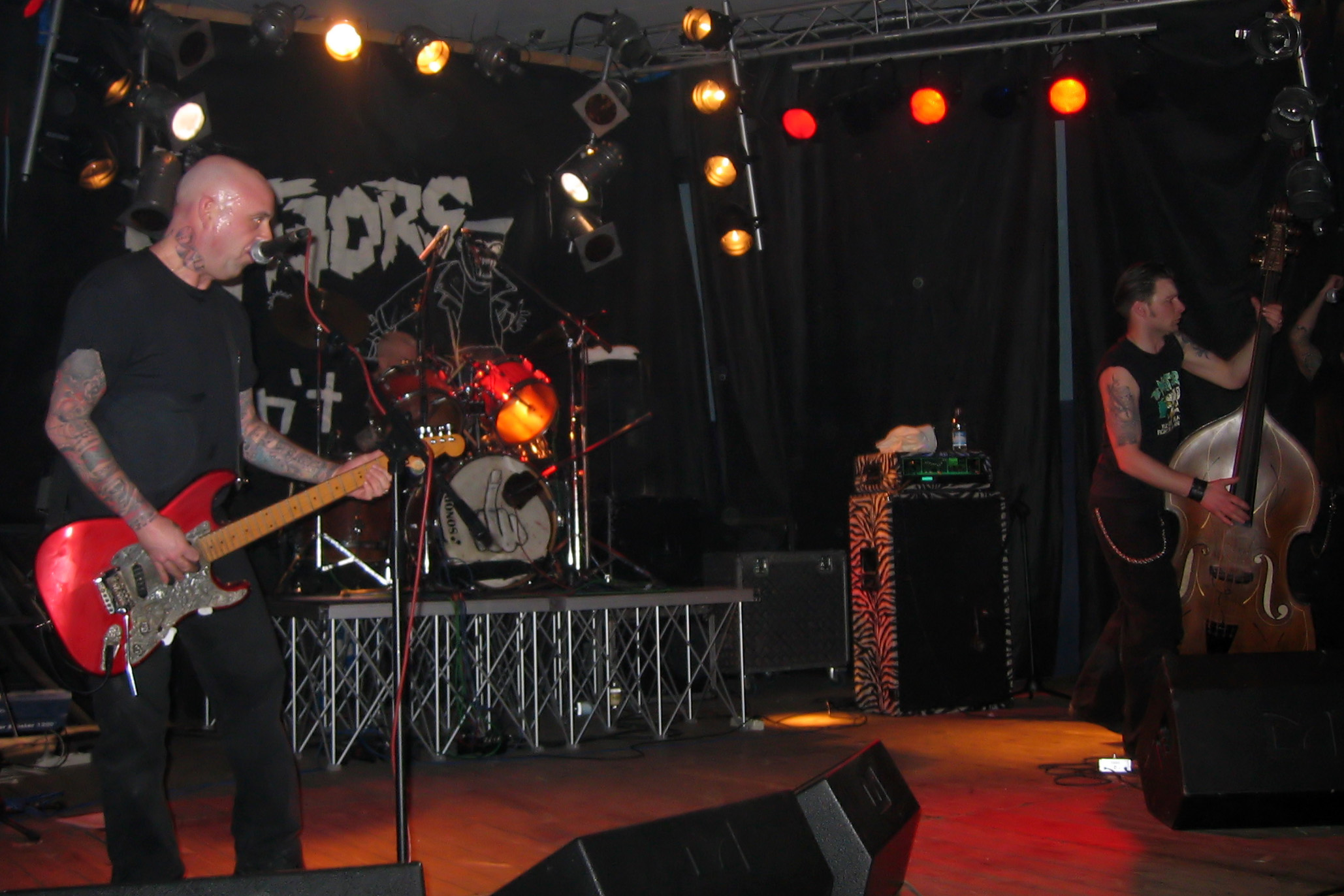
- The Meteors performing in Pordenone, Italy in 2006

Background information
- Origin: London, England
- Genre: Psychobilly
- Years active: 1980–present
- Label: Mutant Rock Records
- Members: P. Paul Fenech; Lobo; Ivan

The Meteors are an English psychobilly band formed in 1980. Originally from London, England, they are one of the pioneers of the psychobilly subgenre — which fuses punk rock with rockabilly — its distinctive sound and style. "Starting in the neo-rockabilly scene, the Meteors were initially shunned for being too spooky and mean. Excuses for exclusion from rockabilly concerts varied from the band having too extreme of a sound to their drummer having green hair." The Meteors blended elements of punk rock, 1960s garage band surf music, rockabilly, and horror film themes in their music and are thought to be one of the first bands to use the label 'Psychobilly' to define a genre and musical style, though the term is used as a lyrical motif as part of the narrative in the Johnny Cash and The Tennessee Three song, "One Piece at a Time".

== Biography ==
The Meteors were formed in 1980 by P. Paul Fenech (guitar and vocals), Nigel Lewis (upright bass/electric bass and vocals), and Mark Robertson (drums). Fenech and Lewis had played in rockabilly bands before, but left their former band, Raw Deal, in order to experiment with a new sound that mixed horror and science fiction lyrics with a punk rock / rockabilly crossover.

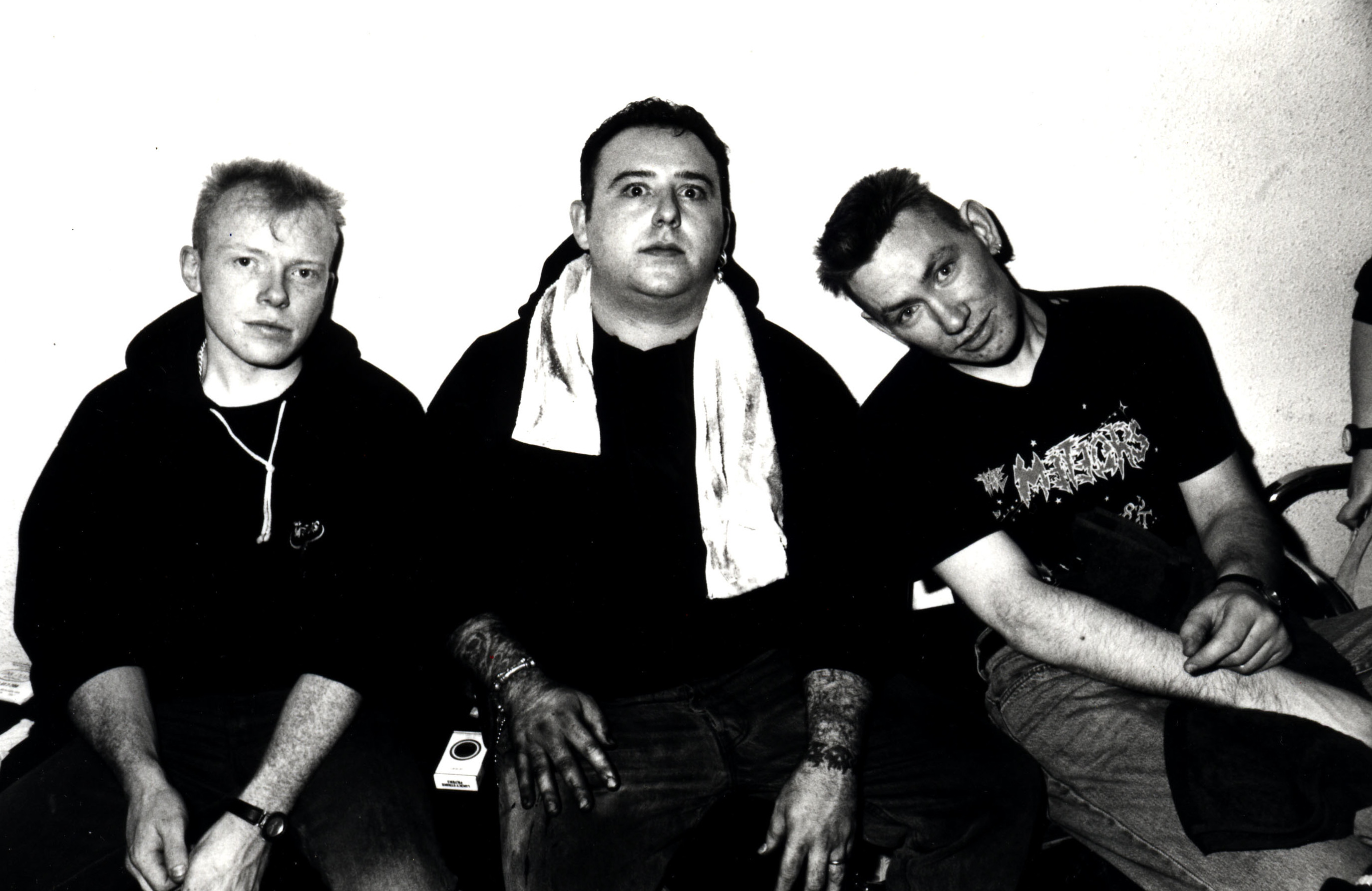
The Meteors, early 1990s

The band made their first TV appearance on Thames TV afternoon show White Light in late 1980. The Meteors made a short film in late 1980 with comedian Keith Allen called Meteor Madness. It was released as a double feature with 2 Tone ska film Dance Craze in March 1981. The movie featured four songs, which made it onto the band's first vinyl single first issued on Ace Records and later on Big Beat. The tracks were also issued as a rare 12" mini-album called The Meteors Meet Screaming Lord Sutch. Soon after that, they issued the double A-side anthems "Radioactive Kid" and "Graveyard Stomp". A session was recorded for the John Peel BBC radio show in June 1981. Again, to date, these tracks have never been officially released. In August 1981, the band were signed to Island Records and recorded their first album, The Case Of The Meteors In Heaven, and 7" single, "The Crazed". The Meteors have gone through many line-up changes since, with Fenech being the only original member to date. Fenech has also released solo albums and played in side projects including The Legendary Raw Deal (rockabilly), The Surfing Dead (instrumental), and The Murder Brothers. Fenech also helped the young Austrian band Sir Psyko & His Monsters by mixtaping their album Reaperstale, as well as in recording one of the live shows in 2012 in Berlin called "Welcome to Our Hell".

== Discography ==
=== Albums ===
- 1981 In Heaven
- 1983 Wreckin' Crew
- 1984 Stampede!
- 1985 Monkey's Breath
- 1986 Sewertime Blues
- 1987 Don't Touch the Bang Bang Fruit
- 1988 Only the Meteors Are Pure Psychobilly
- 1988 The Mutant Monkey and the Surfers from Zorch
- 1989 Undead, Unfriendly and Unstoppable
- 1991 Madman Roll
- 1992 Demonopoly
- 1994 No Surrender
- 1995 Mental Instru Mentals
- 1997 Bastard Sons of a Rock’n’Roll Devil
- 1999 The Meteors vs. the World
- 2001 Psycho Down!
- 2003 Psychobilly
- 2004 These Evil Things
- 2004 The Lost Album
- 2007 Hymns for the Hellbound
- 2009 Hell Train Rollin'
- 2012 Doing the Lord's Work
- 2016 The Power of 3
- 2024 40 Days a Rotting

=== Singles and EPs ===
- 1981 "Meteor Madness"
- 1981 "Radioactive Kid" / "Graveyard Stomp"
- 1981 "The Meteors Meet Screaming Lord Sutch"
- 1981 "The Crazed" / "Attack of the Zorch Men"
- 1982 "Mutant Rock"
- 1983 "Johnny Remember Me"
- 1984 "I'm Just a Dog"
- 1985 "Hogs & Cuties"
- 1985 "Fire, Fire"
- 1985 "Stampede"
- 1985 "Bad Moon Rising"
- 1986 "Surf City"
- 1986 "Archive4"
- 1987 "Don't Touch the Bang Bang Fruit"
- 1987 "Go Buddy Go"
- 1988 "Somebody Put Something in My Drink"
- 1988 "Rawhide" / "Surfin' on the Planet Zorch"
- 1988 "Please Don't Touch (song)"
- 1991 "Encores"
- 1991 "Chainsaw Boogie"
- 1992 "Who Do You Love"
- 1994 "Hell Ain't Hot Enough for Me"
- 1994 "The Meteors"
- 1997 "Slow Down You Grave Robbing Bastard"
- 2005 "25th Anniversary" (tracks: "When Darkness Falls" / "The Crazed")
- 2007 "Disneyland" / "Surf City"
- 2009 "Psychobilly Number One"
- 2012 "The Psychomania Syndrome (Welcome)"
- 2016 "Psycho (Wrecked Forever)"
- 2020 "Dreamin' Up A Nightmare"
- 2023 "Murder Party" / "Dead Man's Hand"
- 2026 "Don't Play With Dead Things"

=== Live albums ===
- 1983 The Meteors Live
- 1986 Live II
- 1987 Live and Loud!!
- 1987 Night of the Werewolf
- 1990 Live Styles of the Sick and Shameless (Live III)
- 1991 Encores
- 1992 Live 4 ... International Wreckers
- 1996 Welcome to the Wreckin’ Pit
- 1996 International Wreckers 2 (The Lost Tapes of Zorch)
- 1999 Psychobilly Revolution
- 2002 The Final Conflict
- 2003 From Beyond (recording from a 1981 gig, to date the only official 'live' recording of the original line-up)
- 2004 Hell in the Pacific
- 2012 Maniac Rockers from Hell
- 2020 Best of Life (vinyl)

=== Compilations ===
- 1980 Home Grown Rockabilly (Alligator records) various artists compilation featuring 3 songs by The Meteors
- 1985 The Curse of the Mutants
- 1986 Teenagers from Outer Space (all the tracks of the original line-up including a few rare unreleased tracks)
- 1987 Don't Touch the Bang Bang Fruit
- 1989 Stampede & Monkey's Breath
- 1989 Undead, Unfriendly and Unstoppable Plus the Mutant Monkey and the Surfers from Zorch
- 1991 Bad Moon Rising
- 1991 The Meteors Live & the Meteors Live II
- 1993 The Best Of
- 1995 Corpse Grinder (The Best Of)
- 1995 Graveyard Stomp, the Best of the Meteors 1981–1988
- 1995 Sewertime Blues / Don't Touch the Bang Bang Fruit
- 1995 Live, Leary and Fucking Loud!
- 1996 John Peel Sessions (1983–1985)
- 1997 From Zorch with Love: The Very Best of the Meteors 1981–1987
- 2001 Anagram Singles Collection
- 2002 Wreckin' Live
- 2005 Meteor Club – The Best Of
- 2008 Kings of Psychobilly
- 2012 30th Anniversary Box
- 2013 Psychobilly Rules! The Collection
- 2014 Original Albums Collection (5-CD box set)
