= What Happens in Hell, Stays in Hell =

Studio album by Nekromantix
- Released: August 2, 2011
- Genre: Psychobilly
- Label: Hellcat (80516)
- Producer: Kim Nekroman

Nekromantix chronology
Life Is a Grave & I Dig It! (2007)	What Happens in Hell, Stays in Hell (2011)

What Happens in Hell, Stays in Hell is the eighth studio album by the psychobilly band the Nekromantix, released August 2, 2011 through Hellcat Records. It is the band's first album with guitarist Franc and drummer Lux; Franc replaced touring guitarist Pete Belair in 2007, while Lux replaced former drummer Andy DeMize who was killed in a car crash in January 2009.

== Track listing ==
No.	Title	Length
1.	"Bats in My Pants"
2.	"NekroTastic Extasy"
3.	"SleepWalker with a Gun"
4.	"DemonSpeed"
5.	"Crazy"
6.	"What Happens in Hell, Stays in Hell!"
7.	"I Kissed a Ghoul"
8.	"Once We Were Lovers"
9.	"Chasing Ghosts"
10.	"Love You Deadly"
11.	"Bela Lugosi's Star"
12.	"MonsterBait"
13.	"Triskaedekaphobia"

== Personnel ==
- Kim Nekroman - double bass, lead vocals
- Franc - guitars, backing vocals
- Lux - drums, backing vocals

== Technical ==
- Maor Appelbaum - mastering
