= Brought Back to Life =

1992 album by Nekromantix

Studio album by Nekromantix
- Released: 1992
- Genre: Psychobilly
- Label: Intermusic
- Producer: Kim Nekroman

Nekromantix chronology
Curse of the Coffin (1991)	Brought Back to Life (1992)	Demons Are a Girl's Best Friend (1996)

Alternative cover
- Cover of the vinyl LP release

Professional ratings
Review scores
Source	Rating
Allmusic	2.5/5 stars

Brought Back to Life is the third album by the Danish psychobilly band the Nekromantix, released in 1992 by Intermusic Records. It was the band's first album to include drummer Tim Kristensen (credited as Grim Tim Handsome) and only album to include guitarist Jan Daggry (credited as Ian Dawn), replacing original members Peter Sandorff and Peek who had left the band. Brought Back to Life earned a Grammy Award nomination for "Best Heavy Metal Album." The album was re-released in 2005 by Hellcat Records under the title Brought Back Again (see below).

== Track listing ==
All songs written by Gaarde/Daggry/Kristensen

No.	Title	Length
1.	"Bloody Holiday"	4:33
2.	"Monster Movie Fan"	3:30
3.	"Driller Killer"	2:55
4.	"Jack the Stripper"	3:54
5.	"Horrorscope"	4:04
6.	"Reincarnated Love"	4:14
7.	"Back from the Grave"	3:32
8.	"Monster Metal"	4:02
9.	"Nekrofelia"	2:48
10.	"Dial 666"	3:03
11.	"Luni Lab"	3:45
12.	"Brought Back to Life"	3:34

== Performers ==
- Kim Nekroman – double bass, vocals
- Ian Dawn (Jan Daggry) – guitar, backing vocals
- Grim Tim Handsome (Tim Kristensen) – drums

== Album information ==
- Record label: Intermusic
- All songs written by Gaarde/Daggry/Kristensen
- Recorded at SB Studios in Copenhagen, Denmark, in 1992
- Engineered, mixed and mastered by Jan Eliasson
- Photography by P. Westh
- Artwork and layout by Kim Nekroman

== Brought Back Again ==
Brought Back Again

Studio album by Nekromantix
- Released: 2005
- Recorded: 1992
- Genre: Psychobilly
- Label: Hellcat Records
- Producer: Kim Nekroman

Nekromantix chronology
Dead Girls Don't Cry (2004)	Brought Back Again (2005)	Life Is a Grave & I Dig It! (2007)

Professional ratings
Review scores
Source	Rating
Allmusic	link

In 2005 Brought Back to Life was re-released by Hellcat Records under the title Brought Back Again. The album was digitally remastered by Kim Nekroman, Geoff Kresge, and Henrik Neidemeier. The re-release added an introduction and alternate versions of two tracks. The introduction had been recorded during the original sessions, but the recording tape had become tangled in the tape machine and could not be used on the original release. The tape was restored by Nekroman and Kresge and the intro was able to be incorporated on the re-release. The re-release also replaced the original version of "Monster Movie Fan" with an alternate version containing a slightly different ending, and added an additional version of "Nekrofelia" that included organ and bell instruments.

The re-release altered the album's artwork, replacing the original cover with one showing the three band members' heads, thus matching the covers of most of their other albums. The original band photo was used as the back cover artwork. Finally, the new cover crossed out the "to Life" in the title and added "Again" in scrawl above it, effectively titling the re-release Brought Back Again. However, as the cross-out markings are difficult to see in small or low-resolution images and without looking closely, most retailers and music sources interpret the new title as Brought Back to Life Again.

=== Track listing ===
All songs written by Gaarde/Daggry/Kristensen

1. "Intro" – 0:28
2. "Bloody Holiday" – 4:00
3. "Monster Movie Fan" (alternate ending) – 3:28
4. "Driller Killer" – 2:55
5. "Jack the Stripper" – 3:47
6. "Horrorscope" – 3:47
7. "Reincarnated Love" – 4:06
8. "Back From the Grave" – 3:31
9. "Monster Metal" – 3:56
10. "Nekrofelia" – 2:46
11. "Dial 666" – 3:01
12. "Luni Lab" – 3:45
13. "Brought Back to Life" – 3:32
14. "Nekrofelia" (organ & bell version) – 2:48

=== Performers ===
- Kim Nekroman – bass, vocals
- Ian Dawn (Jan Daggry) – guitar, backing vocals
- Grim Tim Handsome (Tim Kristensen) – drums
- Doc Dellepude – organ on track 14
- Quasinekro – bells on track 14

=== Re-release information ===
- Record label: Hellcat Records
- Digitally remastered by Kim Nekroman, Geoff Kresge, and Henrik Neidemeyer
- Artwork and layout by Kim Nekroman
