= Demons Are a Girl's Best Friend =

Demons Are a Girl's Best Friend may refer to:

- Demons Are a Girl's Best Friend (album), 1996 studio album by Nekromantix
- "Demons Are a Girl's Best Friend" (song), 2018 single by Powerwolf
