= Return of the Loving Dead =

Studio album by Nekromantix
- Released: 2002
- Genre: Psychobilly
- Label: Hellcat

Nekromantix chronology
Undead 'n' Live (2000)	Return of the Loving Dead (2002)	Dead Girls Don't Cry (2004)

Professional ratings
Review scores
Source	Rating
Allmusic	link

Return of the Loving Dead is the fifth studio album by the Danish psychobilly band the Nekromantix, released in 2002 by Hellcat Records. It was the band's first release on the American record label and their first to be widely distributed in the United States, and a music video was filmed for the single "Gargoyles Over Copenhagen." After this release band leader Kim Nekroman relocated to Los Angeles, California while the remaining members, brothers Peter and Kristian Sandorff, remained in Denmark.

== Track listing ==
All songs written by Gaarde/Sandorff/Sandorff

1. "Nice Day for a Resurrection" - 4:23
2. "Who Killed the Cheerleader" - 4:09
3. "Nekronauts" - 3:31
4. "Subcultural Girl" - 4:13
5. "Gargoyles Over Copenhagen" - 3:57
6. "Trick or Treat" - 4:16
7. "Murder for Breakfast" - 3:07
8. "Rubbermonks & Leathernuns" - 3:58
9. "Generation 666" - 3:25
10. "Return of the Loving Dead" - 5:25
11. "I'm a Hellcat" - 2:55
12. "Haunted Cathouse" - 4:44
13. "Nekronomicon" - 6:59

== Performers ==
- Kim Nekroman - double bass, vocals
- Peter Sandorff - guitar, backing vocals
- Kristian Sandorff - drums

== Album information ==
- Record label: Hellcat Records
- All songs written by Gaarde/Sandorff/Sandorff.
