= Life Is a Grave & I Dig It! =

Life is a Grave & I Dig It!

Studio album by Nekromantix
- Released: 2007
- Recorded: 2006
- Genre: Psychobilly, rockabilly, punk rock
- Label: Hellcat
- Producer: Kim Nekroman

Nekromantix chronology
Dead Girls Don't Cry (2004)	Life is a Grave & I Dig It! (2007)	What Happens in Hell, Stays in Hell (2011)

Professional ratings
Review scores
Source	Rating
Allmusic	4.5/5 stars

Life Is a Grave & I Dig It! is the seventh studio album by the psychobilly band the Nekromantix, released in 2007 by Hellcat Records. It is the group's only album to include guitarist Tröy Deströy and drummer Andy DeMize, replacing brothers Peter and Kristian Sandorff who had left the band in 2005 after frontman Kim Nekroman's relocation to Los Angeles, California from the band's home country of Denmark. Seven months after the album's release Deströy left the band to focus on a solo career and was replaced by guitarist Pete Belair of the Australian band Firebird. In January 2009 Martinez was killed in an automobile accident. He was replaced by Lux, formerly of Mystery Hangup and Sacred Storm.

The cd version of the album contains a fourteenth track which is unlisted on the album sleeve, an instrumental version of "Anaheim After Dark."

== Track listing ==
All songs written by Gaarde/Russel/Martinez

1. "NekroHigh"
2. "Horny in a Hearse"
3. "Life Is a Grave & I Dig It!"
4. "My Girl"
5. "Rot In Hell!"
6. "Voodoo Shop Hop"
7. "Cave Canem"
8. "Flowers Are Slow"
9. "B.E.A.S.T."
10. "Anaheim After Dark"
11. "Fantazma"
12. "Panic at the Morgue"
13. "Out Comes the Batz"
14. "Anaheim After Dark (instrumental)"

== Performers ==
- Kim Nekroman - double bass, lead vocals
- Tröy Deströy (Troy Russel) - guitar, backing vocals
- Andy DeMize (Andrew Martinez) - drums, backing vocals

== Album information ==
- Record label: Hellcat Records
- Recorded "In Hell" Studios in Los Angeles, California in 2006. Drums recorded at Thee Warehouse in Los Angeles.
- Engineered and mixed by Henrik Neidemeier
- Mastered by Jeff King at Threshold Sound
- Produced by Kim Nekroman
- Front cover photo by Den Labre Larvve Og Papa Razzi
- Back cover photo by Matt Ginsberg
- Artwork and layout by Kim Nekroman
