= Demons Are a Girl's Best Friend (album) =

Studio album by Nekromantix
- Released: 1996
- Genre: Psychobilly
- Label: Nervous
- Producer: Kim Nekroman

Nekromantix chronology
Brought Back to Life (1994)	Demons Are a Girl's Best Friend (1996)	Undead 'n' Live (2000)

Alternative cover
- Cover of the 2002 re-release

Demons Are a Girl's Best Friend is the fourth album by the Danish psychobilly band the Nekromantix, through Nervous Records. It was released in 1996. It was the band's last album to include drummer Tim Kristensen (credited as Grim Tim Handsome), and the only album to include guitarist Søren Munk Petersen. After both members left the group, original guitarist Peter Sandorff returned to the lineup and brought in his brother Kristian as drummer. The CD and LP versions of the album were released with different covers, and the LP also included the "Demons Are a Girl's Best Friend" single. The album was re-released in 2002 with new artwork and two bonus tracks.

== Track listing ==
All songs written by Gaarde/Kristensen/Petersen except where indicated.

1. "Demons Are a Girl's Best Friend" – 4:36
2. "Night Nurse" – 3:49
3. "Love at First Bite" (Gaarde/Johansen/Kristensen/Petersen) – 4:33
4. "Always and Never" (Gaarde/Kristensen/Petersen/Westh) – 4:30
5. "Last Night I Saved an Angel" – 3:57
6. "Alive" – 3:41
7. "Sexton Society" – 4:13
8. "Beelzebub" – 3:27
9. "Sea of Red" – 4:39
10. "Technicolor Nightmare" – 4:24
11. "Hypnotized" – 3:52
12. "Wanted" – 5:02

== Performers ==
- Kim Nekroman - double bass, vocals
- Søren Munk Petersen - guitar, backing vocals
- Grim Tim Handsome (Tim Kristensen) - drums

== Album information ==
- Record label: Record Music DK
- songs written by Gaarde/Kristensen/Petersen except "Love at First Bite" by Gaarde/Johansen/Kristensen/Petersen, and "Always and Never" by Gaarde/Kristensen/Petersen/Westh.
- Engineered by Jan Eliasson
- Original cover design by März
