= Undead 'n' Live =

Live album by Nekromantix
- Released: 2000
- Recorded: 1999
- Genre: Psychobilly
- Label: E.S.P.
- Producer: Martin Rostbøll

Nekromantix chronology
Demons Are a Girl's Best Friend (1996)	Undead 'n' Live (2000)	Return of the Loving Dead (2002)

Undead 'n' Live is a live album by the Danish psychobilly band the Nekromantix, released in 2000 by E.S.P. Recordings. It marked the return of the band's original guitarist Peter Sandorff and the introduction of his brother Kristian as drummer. Most of the album's material is drawn from Peter Sandorff's previous years in the band. The album was recorded at Stengade 30 in the band's home town of Copenhagen and includes the previously unreleased song "Nice Day for a Resurrection" which would later appear on the band's 2002 album Return of the Loving Dead.

== Track listing ==
All songs written by Gaarde/Sandorff except where indicated

1. "Nice Day for a Resurrection"

4:35

1. "Devil Smile"

5:08

1. "Bloody Holiday" (Gaarde/Daggry/Kristensen)

5:47

1. "Howlin' at the Moon"

3:11

1. "Demons Are a Girl's Best Friend" (Gaarde/Petersen/Kristensen)

6:20

1. "Nekromantik Baby"

2:38

1. "Hellbound"

2:13

1. "Brain Error"

3:36

1. "Graveyard in Your Memory"

3:05

1. "Motorpsycho"

2:30

1. "Nekrofelia" (Gaarde/Daggry/Kristensen)

2:48

1. "Ride Danny Ride"

3:52

1. "Survive or Die"

4:04

== Performers ==
- Kim Nekroman – double bass, vocals
- Peter Sandorff – guitar, backing vocals
- Kristian Sandorff – drums
- Trond Clements – saxophone on "Howlin' at the Moon" and "Brain Error"

== Album information ==
- Record label: E.S.P. Recordings
- All songs written by Gaarde/Sandorff except "Bloody Holiday" and "Nekrofelia" by Gaarde/Daggry/Kristensen, and "Demons Are a Girl's Best Friend" by Gaarde/Petersen/Kristensen.
- Recorded at Stengade 30 in Copenhagen, Denmark by Henriette Frandsen
- Produced by Martin Rostbøll
- Mixed by the Nekromantix at Media Sound Studio
- Engineered by Peter Brander
- Photos by Birgitte Truelsen except upper right corner photo on cover by Bo Willy Zachariasen with assistance by Gudmund Thai Moltsen
