= Curse of the Coffin =

Studio album by Nekromantix
- Released: July 30, 1991
- Genre: Psychobilly
- Label: Nervous
- Producer: Mickey Mutant

Nekromantix chronology
Hellbound (1989)	Curse of the Coffin (1991)	Brought Back to Life (1992)

Curse of the Coffin is the second album by the Danish psychobilly band the Nekromantix, released in 1991 by Nervous Records. A music video was filmed for the title track and received some play on the MTV program Alternative Nation. The album's final track is a loose cover of "Mama Don't Allow It," a piano tune from the 1920s and 1930s by Cow Cow Davenport, with new lyrics written by band frontman Kim Nekroman.

== Track listing ==
All songs written by Gaarde/Sandorff except where indicated

No.	Title	Length
1.	"Devil Smile"	4:50
2.	"Curse of the Coffin"	4:45
3.	"S/M"	4:32
4.	"Motorpsycho"	2:26
5.	"Alice in Psycholand"	2:57
6.	"Way Down to Hell"	3:02
7.	"Howlin' at the Moon"	3:19
8.	"New Born Son of Satan"	3:34
9.	"Save My Grave"	5:25
10.	"Survive or Die"	3:03
11.	"Part Two"	4:12
12.	"Drugshock"	3:08
13.	"Rockin' Reptile"	2:12
14.	"Mama Don't Allow (Cow Cow Davenport)"	2:55

== Performers ==
- Kim Nekroman - double bass, vocals
- Peter Sandorff - guitar, backing vocals
- Peek - drums

== Album information ==
- Record label: Nervous Records
- All songs written by Gaarde/Sandorff except "Mama Don't Allow" by Cow Cow Davenport.
- Recorded at Madhouse Studio in Luton, England
- Engineered by Pete Gage
- Produced by Mickey Mutant
