= Hellbound (Nekromantix album) =

Studio album by Nekromantix
- Released: 1989
- Studio: ML Studio, The Hague
- Genre: Psychobilly
- Label: Tombstone Records

Nekromantix chronology
Hellbound (1989)	Curse of the Coffin (1991)

Hellbound is the debut album by the Danish psychobilly band the Nekromantix, released in 1989 by Tombstone Records. After a few initial performances the band played a large festival in Hamburg, Germany and were offered the recording contract which resulted in this album.

== Track listing ==
All songs written by Gaarde/Sandorff

No.	Title	Length
1.	"Nekromantix"	3:28
2.	"Hellbound"	2:13
3.	"Nightmare"	2:25
4.	"Spiders Attacking Manhattan"	5:16
5.	"Brain Error"	2:46
6.	"Graveyard in Your Memory"	3:17
7.	"Ride Danny Ride"	3:14
8.	"Bloodtide"	3:45
9.	"Hellstreet"	3:12
10.	"Down in the Swamp"	4:25
11.	"Nekromantic Baby"	2:35
12.	"Busse Brodre"	0:06
13.	"Electric Chair"	4:31

== Personnel ==
- Kim Nekroman - double bass, vocals
- Peter Sandorff - guitar, backing vocals
- Peek - drums

== Album information ==
- Record label: Tombstone Records
- All songs written by Gaarde/Sandorff.
- Artwork and design by Kim Nekroman
