= Nekromantix =

Danish psychobilly band

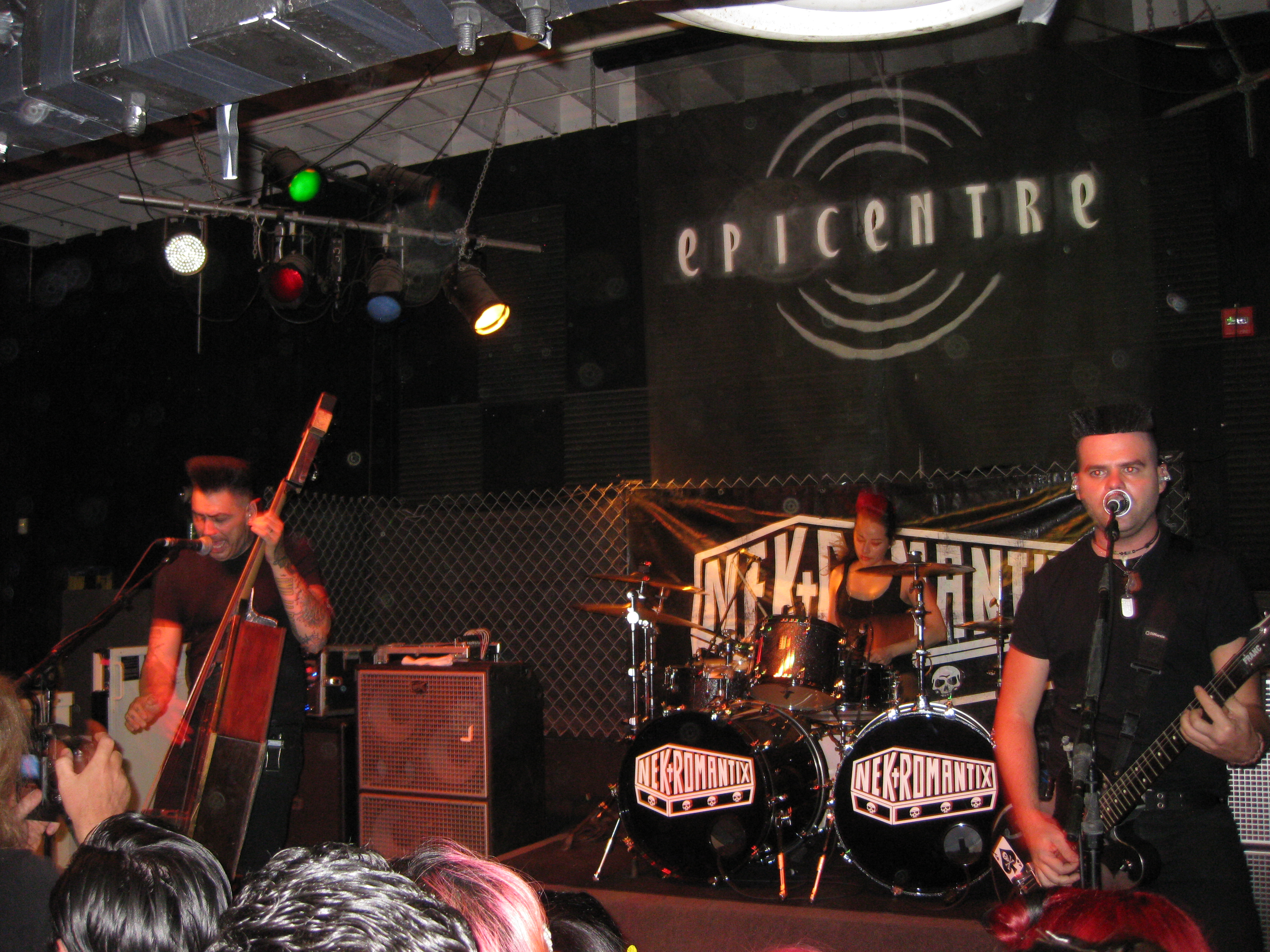
- Nekromantix performing in 2011. L-R: Nekroman, Lux, Mesa

Background information
- Origin: Copenhagen, Denmark
- Genres: Psychobilly, gothabilly
- Years active: 1989–present
- Labels: Hellcat; Intermusic; Record Music Denmark; E.S.P.; Kick Music; Nervous; Tombstone
- Members: Kim Nekroman; Francisco Mesa; Mike Mata
- Past members: Paolo Molinari; Jens Brygman; Peter Sandorff; Sebastian Jensen; Ian Dawn; Grim Tim Handsome; Søren Munk Petersen; Kristian Sandorff; Tormod Holm; Tröy Deströy; Wasted James; Andy DeMize; Pete Belair; Lux; Adam Guerrero; Rene La Muerto
- Website: nekromantix.net

The Nekromantix is a Danish psychobilly band founded in Copenhagen in 1989. Their lyrics are generally structured around monster and horror themes. A central icon of the band's image is founder and frontman Kim Nekroman's "coffinbass", a custom-built double bass with a body in the shape of a coffin and a headstock the shape of a cross. Nekroman has been the sole constant member of the band. The current lineup consists of guitarist Francisco Mesa and drummer Mike Mata.

The Nekromantix released five albums on various European record labels during their first decade, then crossed over to American audiences in the early 2000s by signing to Los Angeles–based Hellcat Records, through which they have released three albums since 2002. Their eighth studio album, What Happens in Hell, Stays in Hell, was released in August 2011.

== History ==
=== Formation ===
Nekromantix were formed in 1989 in Copenhagen by Kim Nekroman after he left the Danish Navy, in which he had been a submarine radio operator for eight years. Deciding to launch a new career in music, he initially played drums in a rockabilly band prior to the foundation of Nekromantix.

Learning to play the double bass and to sing, Nekroman set about forming a horror-themed psychobilly band with himself as the frontman. Initially consisting of Nekroman, guitarist Paolo Molinari and drummer Jens Brygman, the band took the name Nekromantix.

A centerpiece of the band's image was Nekroman's self-constructed "coffinbass", an upright bass in the shape of a coffin. The first of these was constructed using an actual child-sized coffin, but over the years he has constructed new models in order to achieve better acoustics and collapsibility for easier transportation. By the time of the band's first official recordings, Molinari had been replaced by Peter Sandorff.

After six months of practice and two local performances in Copenhagen at the Stengade 30 club, the Nekromantix appeared at large psychobilly festival in Hamburg, Germany. Their performance earned them a recording contract with Tombstone Records for their first album Hellbound. The band began touring Europe and built a name for themselves in the European psychobilly movement, which at the time was largely dominated by British acts. In 1991 the band released their second album Curse of the Coffin through Nervous Records and supported it with a music video for the title track which received some play on the MTV program Alternative Nation.

=== Lineup changes ===
In 1992 both Jensen and Sandorff left the band. They were replaced by guitarist Jan Daggry and drummer Tim Kristensen, who used the stage names Ian Dawn ("Dawn" being an English translation of the Danish name Daggry) and Grim Tim Handsome. This lineup recorded the album Brought Back to Life, released in 1994, which earned a Grammy Award nomination for "Best Heavy Metal Album".

Daggry then left the band and was replaced on tour first by Emil Oelund and then by Tormod Holm, until the band found new permanent guitarist Søren Munk Petersen. The Nekroman/Petersen/Kristensen lineup recorded 1996's Demons Are a Girl's Best Friend. During this time the band toured most of Europe including Finland, Germany, the UK, the Netherlands, Belgium, Sweden and France, and also toured Japan. They began to achieve cult status in the United States, where their albums were as yet only available as imports.

At a 1996 festival in Cologne, Germany, Nekroman met fellow Copenhagen native Patricia Day, with whom he launched a new band called HorrorPops with himself on guitar and Day on double bass and lead vocals. The two would later marry, and their activity with HorrorPops put the Nekromantix on hold for several years, during which time Kristensen and Petersen both left the band.

=== International success ===
In 1997 Peter Sandorff returned to Nekromantix, bringing along his brother, Kristian, to play drums. In 1999 the band played a tenth-anniversary performance at Stengade 30 in Copenhagen, where they had performed their first shows after forming the band. This performance was recorded by Danish National Radio for a series of live shows and released the following year as the live album Undead 'n' Live. In 2000 the Nekromantix played their first performances in the United States, beginning with the first annual New York City "Psychobilly Rumble" and continuing with a nine-date tour of the west coast.

In February 2001 Nekroman gave a demo of new songs to Rancid singer/guitarist and Hellcat Records label owner Tim Armstrong, a longtime fan of the band. The Nekromantix soon signed to the Los Angeles–based Hellcat and released the 2002 album Return of the Loving Dead. Recorded in Denmark, it was the band's first album to be widely distributed in the U.S. and helped make them part of an emerging psychobilly movement on the west coast centered around the Hellcat label and spearheaded by bands such as Tiger Army. The album was supported with a music video for the song "Gargoyles Over Copenhagen" and the band toured the United States several times.

=== Move to the United States ===
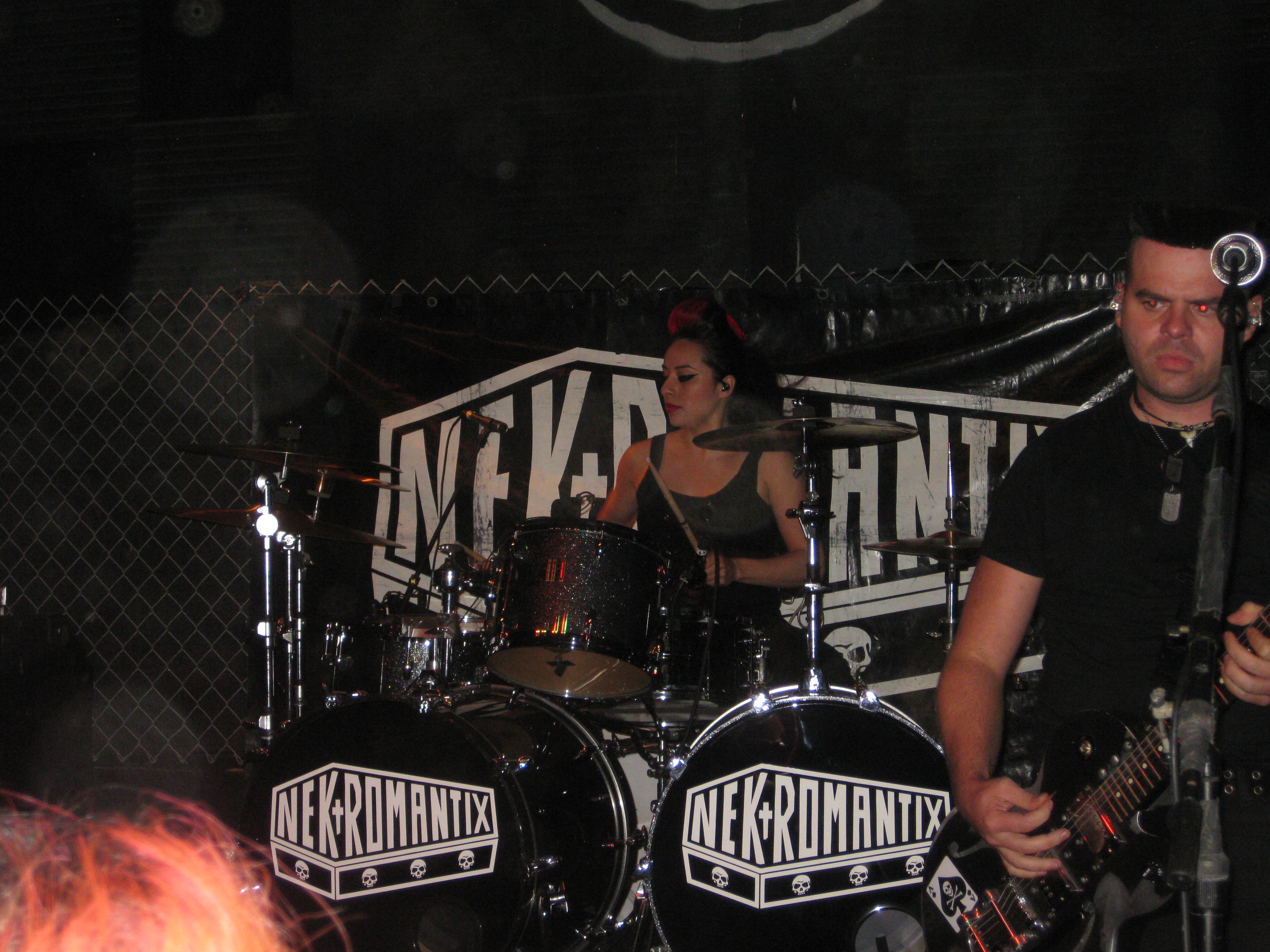
Guitarist Francisco Mesa (right) joined the band in 2009, while drummer Lux (center) joined in 2010.

Following the release of Return of the Loving Dead Nekroman relocated to Los Angeles, touring and recording two albums with the HorrorPops. The Sandorff brothers remained in Denmark, and recording of the Nekromantix' 2004 album Dead Girls Don't Cry was done almost entirely in Los Angeles, with only Peter Sandorff's backing vocals recorded in Copenhagen. In April 2005 the Sandorffs left the band leaving only Nekroman in band. To replace them Nekroman recruited guitarist Troy Russel (Tröy Deströy) and drummer James Mesa (Wasted James) of the California-based psychobilly band the Rezurex. That year the band's third album Brought Back to Life was remastered and re-released by Hellcat under the title Brought Back to Life Again.

=== Recent activity ===
In May 2006 Meza left the Nekromantix, later joining Tiger Army. He was replaced by Andrew Martinez (Andy DeMize) of The Rocketz. Life Is a Grave & I Dig It! was released in April 2007. In November 2007 the band announced Tröy Deströy's departure to focus on a solo career. Pete Belair of the Australian band Firebird was announced as the band's new guitarist and performed with them during their 2008 tours, living in Australia complicated things and Francisco Mesa, formerly of Barcelona-based Nightbreed and Ultimo Asalto, joined as a permanent guitarist.

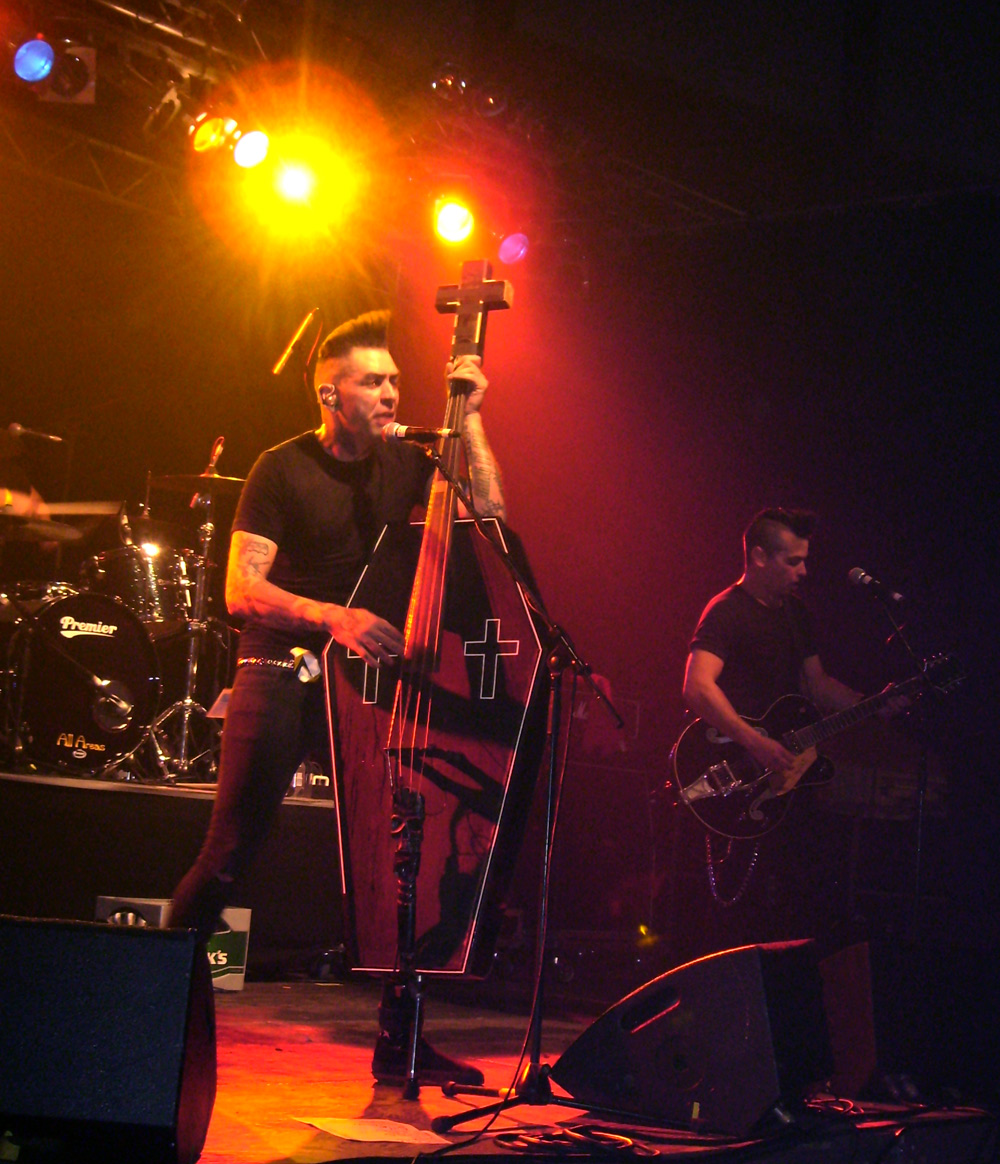
Nekromantix at the Satanic Stomp in 2008

On 11 January 2009, Martinez was killed in an automobile collision. The following month it was announced that Lux, formerly of Mystery Hangup and Sacred Storm, would be Martinez's replacement. The band's first female member, Lux stated that the Nekromantix would tour North America with Reverend Horton Heat during the summer and record a new album later in the year. The band's eighth studio album, What Happens in Hell, Stays in Hell, was released 2 August 2011. The band supported the album with a tour of the United States from July to September 2011. In April 2014, it was announced that Lux would depart from the band. It was later announced in June 2014 that Adam Guerrero, formerly of Rezurex, would replace Lux as the new Nekromantix drummer. In October 2017, Guerrero departed from the band and Lux returned to fill in for a few shows. In April 2018 it was announced that Rene "Delamuerte" Garcia, from The Brains and BAT! would be the new Nekromantix drummer.

== Band members ==
Nekromantix lineups
1989	Kim Nekroman – "coffinbass", lead vocals; Paolo Molinari – guitars, backing vocals; Sebastian Jensen – drums
1989–1993 Hellbound Curse of the Coffin	Kim Nekroman – "coffinbass", lead vocals; Peter Sandorff – guitars, backing vocals; Sebastian Jensen – drums
1993–1995 Brought Back to Life	Kim Nekroman – "coffinbass", lead vocals; Grim Tim Handsome – drums; Ian Dawn – guitars, backing vocals
1995–1996 Demons Are a Girl's Best Friend	Kim Nekroman – "coffinbass", lead vocals; Grim Tim Handsome – drums; Søren Munk Petersen – guitars, backing vocals
1997–2005 Undead 'n' Live Return of the Loving Dead Dead Girls Don't Cry	Kim Nekroman – "coffinbass", lead vocals; Peter Sandorff – guitars, backing vocals; Kristian Sandorff – drums
2005–2006	Kim Nekroman – "coffinbass", lead vocals; Tröy Deströy – guitars, backing vocals; Wasted James – drums
2006–2007 Life Is a Grave & I Dig It!	Kim Nekroman – "coffinbass", lead vocals; Tröy Deströy – guitars, backing vocals; Andy DeMize – drums
2007–2008	Kim Nekroman – "coffinbass", lead vocals; Andy DeMize – drums; Pete Belair – guitars, backing vocals
2009–2014 What Happens in Hell, Stays in Hell	Kim Nekroman – "coffinbass", lead vocals; Francisco Mesa – guitars, backing vocals; Lux – drums
2014–2018 A Symphony of Wolf Tones & Ghost Notes	Kim Nekroman – "coffinbass", vocals; Francisco Mesa – guitars, backing vocals; Mighty Mouse – drums
2018–2019	Kim Nekroman – "coffinbass", lead vocals; Francisco Mesa – guitars, backing vocals; Dlamuerte – drums

=== Current members ===
- Kim Nekroman – "coffinbass", lead vocals (1989–present)
- Francisco Mesa – guitars, backing vocals (2008–present)
- Mike Mata – drums (2019–present)

=== Past members ===
- Paolo Molinari – guitars (1989)
- Sebastian Jensen – drums (1989–1993)
- Peter Sandorff – guitars, backing vocals (1989–1993, 1997–2005)
- Ian Dawn (Jan Daggry) – guitars, backing vocals (1993–1994)
- Emil Oelund – guitars (1994–1995)
- Tormod Holm – guitars (1995)
- Søren Munk Petersen – guitars, backing vocals (1995–1996)
- Grim Tim Handsome (Tim Kristensen) – drums (1993–1996)
- Kristian Sandorff – drums (1997–2005)
- Wasted James (James Meza) – drums (2005–2006)
- Tröy Deströy – guitars, backing vocals (2005–2007)
- Pete Belair – guitars, backing vocals (2007–2008)
- Andy DeMize (Andrew Martinez) – drums (2006–2009)
- Lux – drums (2009–2014)
- Adam "Mighty Mouse" Guerrero – drums (2014–2017)
- Rene Dlamuerte Garcia – drums (2018–2019)
- Mike Mata - drums (2019-present)
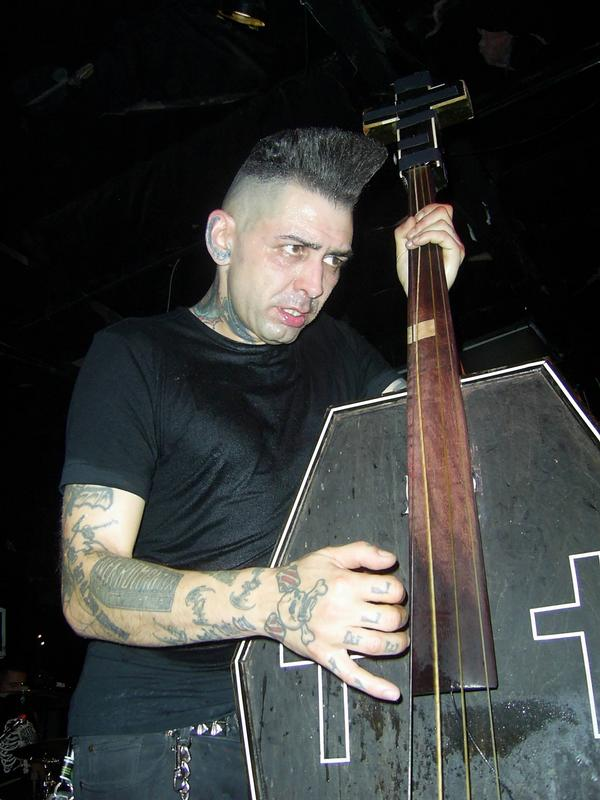
Kim Nekroman

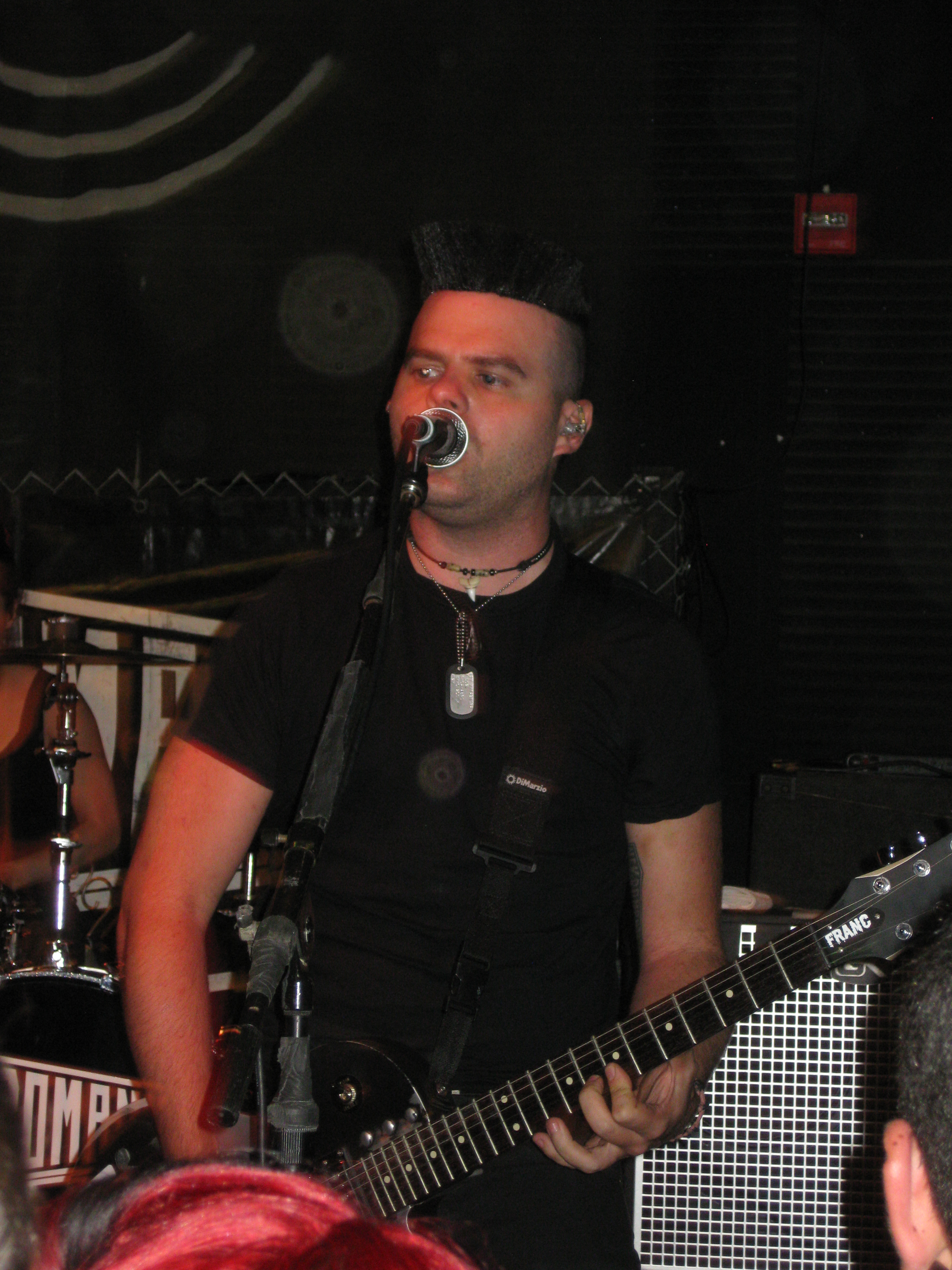
Francisco Mesa

== Discography ==
Nekromantix discography
- Studio albums: 8
- Live albums: 1
- Singles: 3
- Music videos: 3

The discography of the Nekromantix consists of eight studio albums, two live album, three singles and three music videos.

=== Studio albums ===
Year	Album details	Peak chart positions	
Year	Album details	US	
Year	Album details	Independent	Heatseekers
1989	Hellbound: Released: 1989; Label: Tombstone; Format: CD, LP	—	—
1991	Curse of the Coffin: Released: 30 July 1991; Label: Nervous; Format: CD, LP	—	—
1992	Brought Back to Life: Released: 1992; Label: Intermusic; Format: CD	—	—
1996	Demons Are a Girl's Best Friend: Released: 1996; Label: Record Music Denmark; Format: CD	—	—
2002	Return of the Loving Dead: Released: 12 February 2002; Label: Hellcat; Format: CD, LP	—	—
2004	Dead Girls Don't Cry: Released: 27 April 2004; Label: Hellcat; Format: CD, LP	43	—
2007	Life Is a Grave & I Dig It!: Released: 10 April 2007; Label: Hellcat; Format: CD, LP	—	21
2011	What Happens in Hell, Stays in Hell: Released: 2 August 2011; Label: Hellcat; Format: CD, LP	—	—
2016	A Symphony of Wolf Tones & Ghost Notes: Released: 21 October 2016; Label: Hellcat (Indigo); Format: CD, LP, Download, Stream	—	—
"—" denotes releases that did not chart.

=== Live albums ===
Year	Album details
2000	Undead 'n' Live: Released: 2000; Label: E.S.P. / Kick Music; Format: CD, LP
2019	3 Decades Of Darkle: Released: 2019; Label: Cleopatra Records; Format: CD, LP, Blu-ray Disc, DVD, Digital

=== Singles ===
Year	Single	Album
1994	"Jack the Stripper"	Brought Back to Life
1996	"Demons Are a Girl's Best Friend"	Demons Are a Girl's Best Friend
2004	"Dead Bodies"	n/a
"n/a" denotes singles that are not from albums.

=== Music videos ===
Year	Song	Director	Album
1991	"Curse of the Coffin"		Curse of the Coffin
2002	"Gargoyles Over Copenhagen"		Return of the Loving Dead
2007	"Horny in a Hearse"		Life Is a Grave & I Dig It!

== See also ==
- List of psychobilly bands
