= Dead Girls Don't Cry =

Studio album by Nekromantix
- Released: 2004
- Genre: Psychobilly
- Label: Hellcat

Nekromantix chronology
Return of the Loving Dead (2002)	Dead Girls Don't Cry (2004)	Life Is a Grave & I Dig It! (2007)

Dead Girls Don't Cry is the sixth studio album by the Danish psychobilly band the Nekromantix, released in 2004 by Hellcat Records. It was the group's last album with founding member Peter Sandorff, who had returned to the band several years previous after having been out of the lineup for most of the 1990s, and also their final album with his brother Kristian Sandorff. Prior to this release band leader Kim Nekroman had relocated to Los Angeles, California while the Sandorff brothers remained in Denmark. Recording was therefore rushed as the Sandorffs had to travel to California in order to participate. Following this release the Sandorffs left the band, and Nekroman found new members to fill out the lineup.

== Track listing ==
All songs written by Gaarde/Sandorff/Sandorff

1. "Black Wedding"
2. "Backstage Pass to Hell"
3. "Moonchaser"
4. "Struck By a Wreckin' Ball"
5. "Where Do Monsters Go"
6. "Dead Girls Don't Cry"
7. "What's on Your Neighbors BBQ"
8. "I'm a Shockstar"
9. "Ghoulina"
10. "A Stone With Your/My Name"
11. "Dead Moon Walking"
12. "World of Dust"
13. "Dead By Dawn"
14. untitled

== Performers ==
- Kim Nekroman - double bass, vocals
- Peter Sandorff - guitar, backing vocals
- Kristian Sandorff - drums

== Album information ==
- Record label: Hellcat Records
- All songs written by Gaarde/Sandorff/Sandorff.
- Recorded and mixed at Steakhouse Studio in north Hollywood, California.
- Engineered by John Silas Cranfield with assistance and additional engineering by Ken Eisenagel.
- Additional backing vocals recorded by Benjamin Hammerum and Heinrik Soegaard at Bernie's Bloody Barbershop Studios in Copenhagen, Denmark.
- Mastered by Jeff King at Threshold Sound and Vision in west Los Angeles, California.
- Photography by Bo Willy Zachariasen and Eri Shibata.
- Artwork and layout by Kim Nekroman.
