= Kim Nekroman =

Danish musician

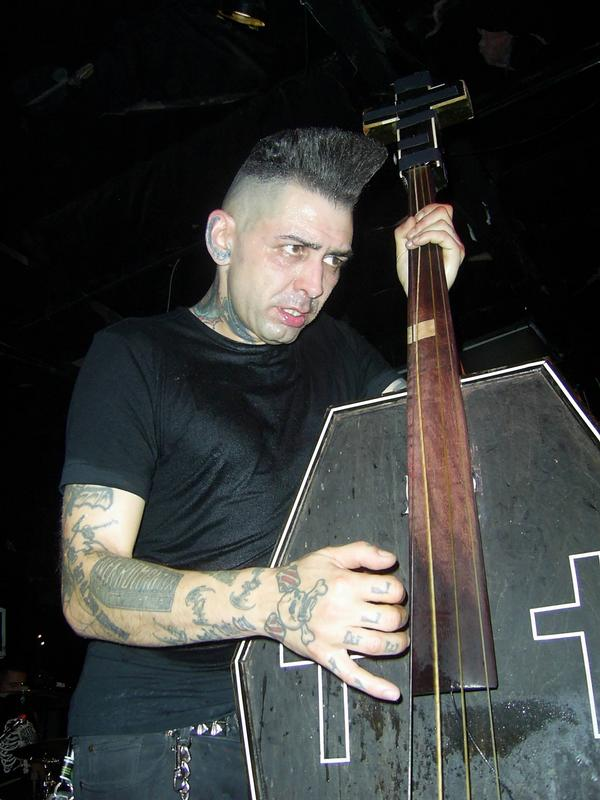
- Nekroman in December 2007

Background information
- Born: Copenhagen, Denmark
- Genres: Psychobilly; rockabilly; punk rock
- Instruments: Vocals; double bass; guitar
- Labels: Hellcat; Epitaph; Intermusic; Record Music; E.S.P.; Kick Music; Nervous; Tombstone
- Member of: Nekromantix; HorrorPops

Kim Nekroman is a Danish musician, he is the bassist and lead singer for the psychobilly band Nekromantix and the lead guitarist of HorrorPops. He was previously enlisted in the Danish Navy as a submarine radio operator for eight years before beginning his music career.

He plays the upright bass, featuring a custom coffin-shaped bass. He is an endorser and user of Gallien-Krueger bass amps.

== Timeline ==
In 1991 the band toured extensively in Europe, releasing Curse of the Coffin, their second full-length album that same year. The Brought Back to Life LP appeared in 1992, and 4 years later Nekromantix released their fourth disc, Demons Are a Girl's Best Friend. A tour in Japan followed, as well as a 1999 live set for Kick Music. Nekromantix signed with Epitaph for 2002's Return of the Loving Dead, and are still with the label through Dead Girls Don't Cry and 2005's Brought Back to Life Again, the latter of which was actually reissue of an out print 1992 release.

== Nekromantix ==
Backing up Nekroman's vocals in '07 were guitarist Troy Destroy and drummer Andy DeMize. However, the current line-up is Adam Guerrero on drums (after the death of Andy DeMize and departure of Lux), Franc on guitar and Nekroman himself on coffin bass and lead vocals. Rene De La Muerte joined the band in 2018 as the new stand-up drummer.

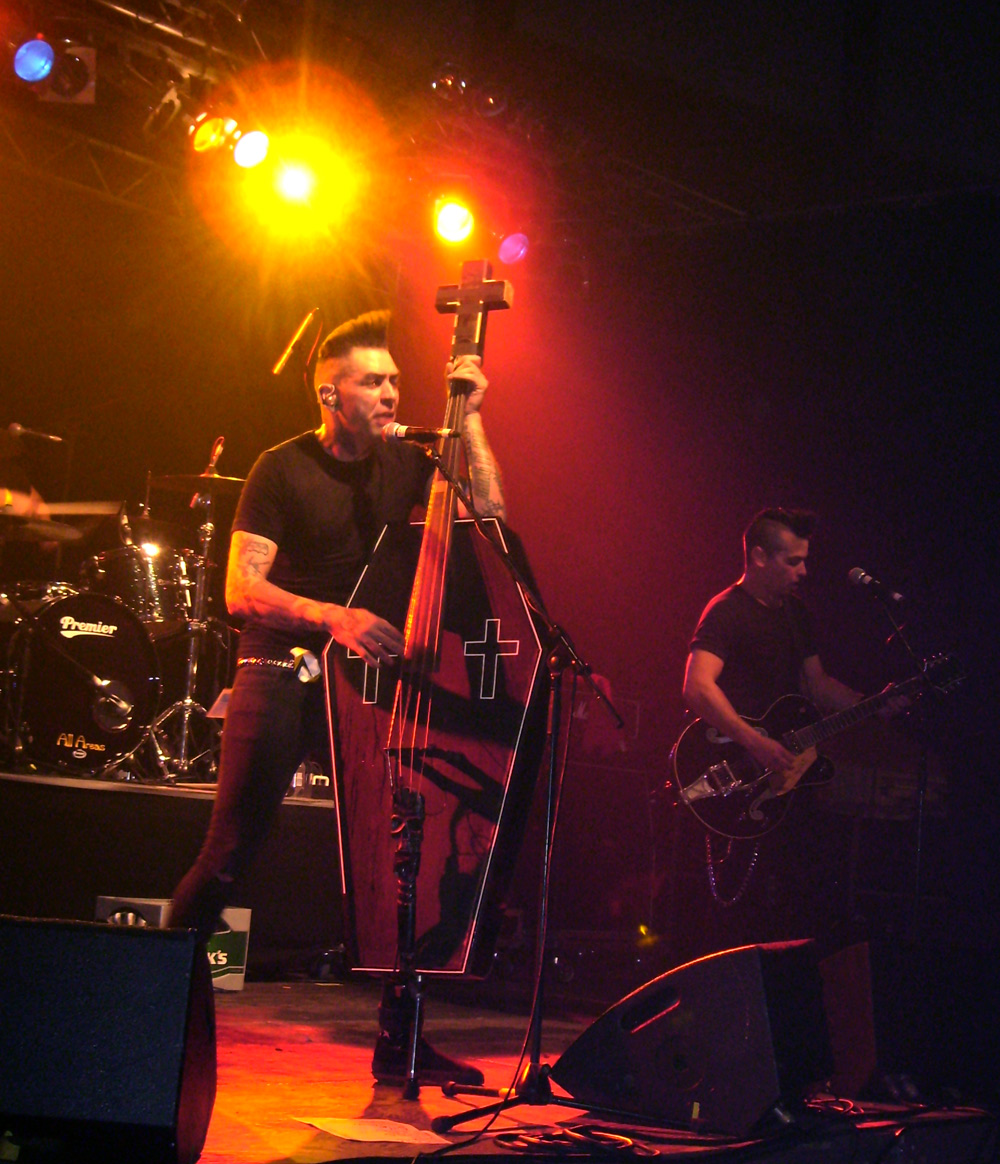
At the Satanic Stomp in 2008

== Discography ==
=== with Nekromantix ===
- Hellbound
- Curse of the Coffin
- Brought Back to Life
- Demons Are a Girl's Best Friend
- Undead 'n' Live
- Return of the Loving Dead
- Dead Girls Don't Cry
- Life Is a Grave & I Dig It!
- What Happens in Hell, Stays in Hell
- A Symphony of Wolftones & Ghostnotes

=== with HorrorPops ===
- Hell Yeah!
- Bring It On!
- Kiss Kiss Kill Kill

=== with Mek & the X-Mas Peks ===
- Mek & the X-Mas Peks

=== compilations ===
- Give 'Em the Boot IV
- Give 'Em the Boot V
- Mek & X-Mas Peks — X-Mas Peks (CD) Kick Music 2000
