= Restless (band) =

British rockabilly band

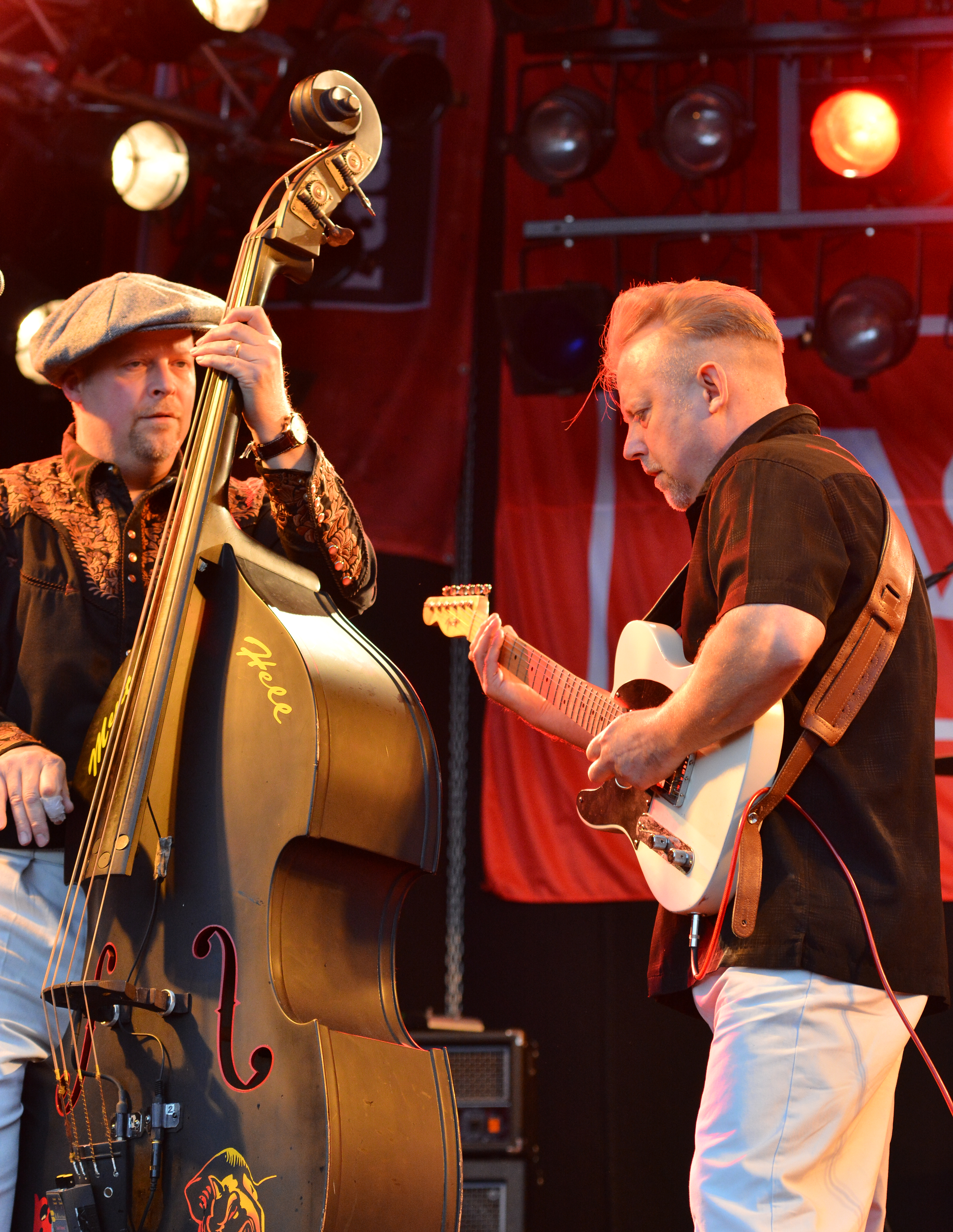
- Restless performing at Hamburger Hafengeburtstag in 2014.

Background information
- Genres: Rockabilly
- Years active: 1978-present
- Labels: Nervous, New, ABC, Madhouse, Vinyl Frontier, Vinyl Japan, Vampirella, Raucous, Crazy Love, I Sold My Soul, Bluelight
- Members: Mark Harman; Ben Cooper (bis 1990, seit 2014); Jeff Bayli (1986–1987, 1989–1990, since 2020); Mick Malone (1986–1990, since 2020)
- Past members: Paul Harman (bis 1984, 2014–2020); Steve Whitehouse (1988, 1990–1993, 2012 (live)); Rob Tyler (1991–2013)

Restless is a British rockabilly band formed in 1978. The group got their name from the song "Restless" by Carl Perkins. The band performed their first gig in Sudbury in 1980, with Mark Harman as front-man on guitar and vocals, and Ben Cooper on drums; the two shared songwriting duties. After the second album was released in 1984, the band re-organised, dropping Mark's brother Paul on bass to be replaced by Jeff Bayly. The band are credited with being pioneers of neo-rockabilly.

== Discography ==
Albums

- Why Don't You Just Rock - 1982
- Do You Feel Restless -1984
- After Midnight - 1986
- Live & Kicking - 1987
- Beat My Drum - 1988
- Moving On - 1990
- Number Seven - 1991
- Figure It Out - 1993
- Three Of A Kind - 1995
- The Lost Sessions - 1996
- Got Some Guts Unplugged 1997
- Do Your Thing - 2002
- Restless Rarities - 2003
- Got It Covered - 2011
- Live at The Klub Foot - 2011
- Sounds Like Restless - 2012
- Seconds Out - 2014
- Live in Tokyo - 2012
- Originals - 2015
- Ready To Go - 2020

Singles/Ep's

- The Restless - 1982
- Edge on You - 1983
- Mister Blues - 1984
- Vanish Without a Trace - 1985
- Somebody Told Me - 1986
- Just a Friend - 1986
- What Can You Say - 1986
- Ice Cold - 1987
- Radar Love/Neutron Dance - 1988
- Tobacco Road - 1990
- Restless Versus The Rizlas - 2002
- Ice Cold - 2018
- Love Like a Bullet - 2019

Compilations

- Stomping at The Klubfoot - 1984
- Early Years - 1987, The Early Years 1981-83
- The Very Best of Restless - 1996
- Kickin' Into Midnight - 1990
- Rock and Roll Beginners - 1998, Jungle Records
- Rock n Roll Train Best of the Madhouse Years - 2005
- Restless The Nervous Years - 2001
- The Best in The East - 2003
