= Grade 2 (band) =

English punk rock band

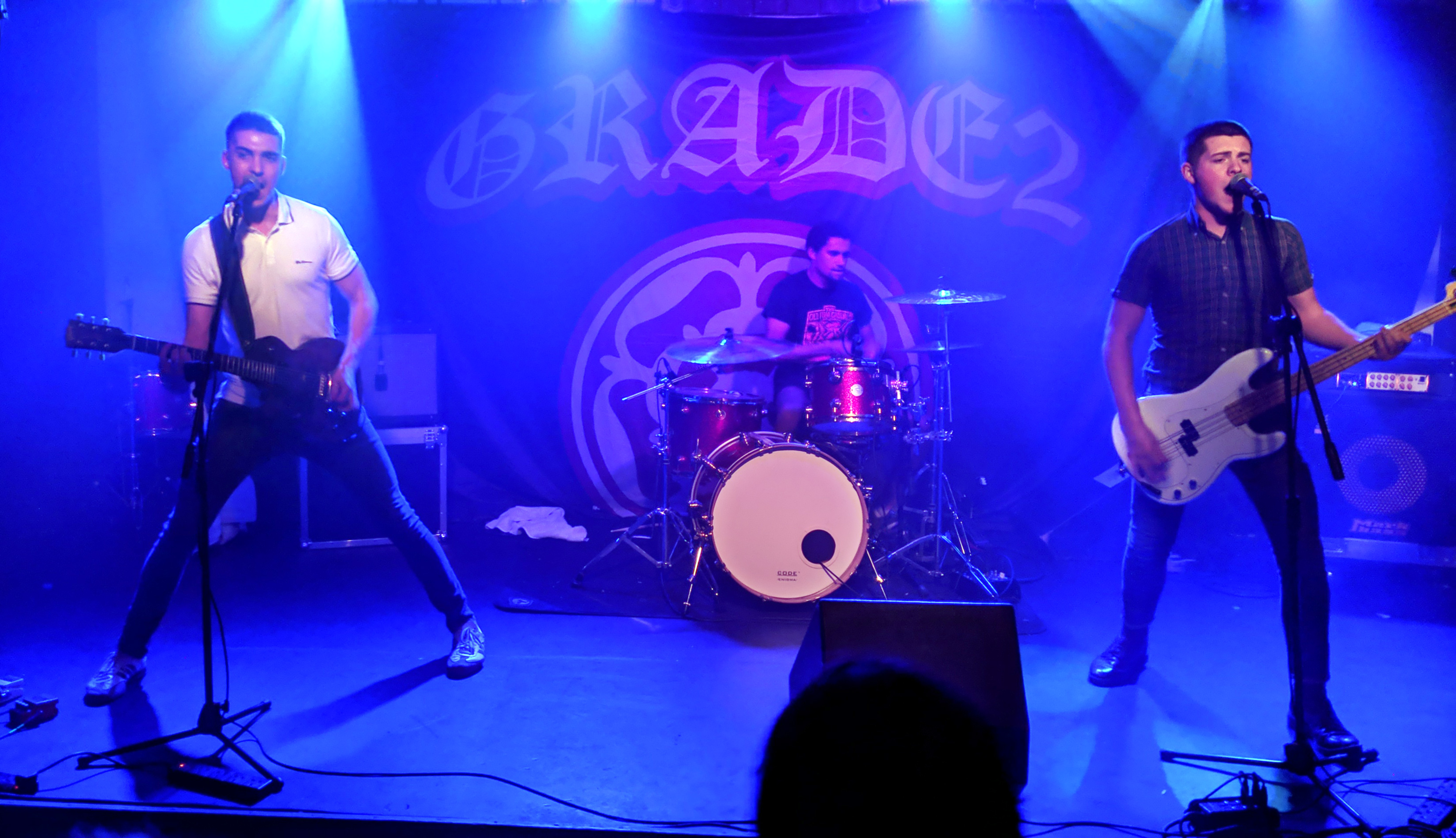
- Grade 2 playing live in Newport, Isle of Wight, 2019

Background information
- Origin: Ryde, Isle of Wight, England
- Genres: Punk rock, Oi!
- Years active: 2013–present
- Label: Hellcat Records
- Members: Sid Ryan; Jack Chatfield; Jacob Hull
- Website: grade2official.co.uk

Grade 2 are an English band from Ryde on the Isle of Wight, consisting of bassist and lead vocalist Sid Ryan, guitarist Jack Chatfield and drummer Jacob Hull. Their music is described as a classic punk sound, and features lyrics about everyday problems. Louder Than War described their album Graveyard Island as "upbeat stripped back punk'n'roll with a bit of yobbo thrown in".

== History ==
=== Formation and early history ===
The band was formed in May 2013, initially playing covers from the punk era by The Stranglers and The Jam, as well as Oi! music by Booze and Glory and Lion’s Law. They began to write original songs and performed regularly in local pubs and clubs, and gained exposure by successfully supporting established bands.

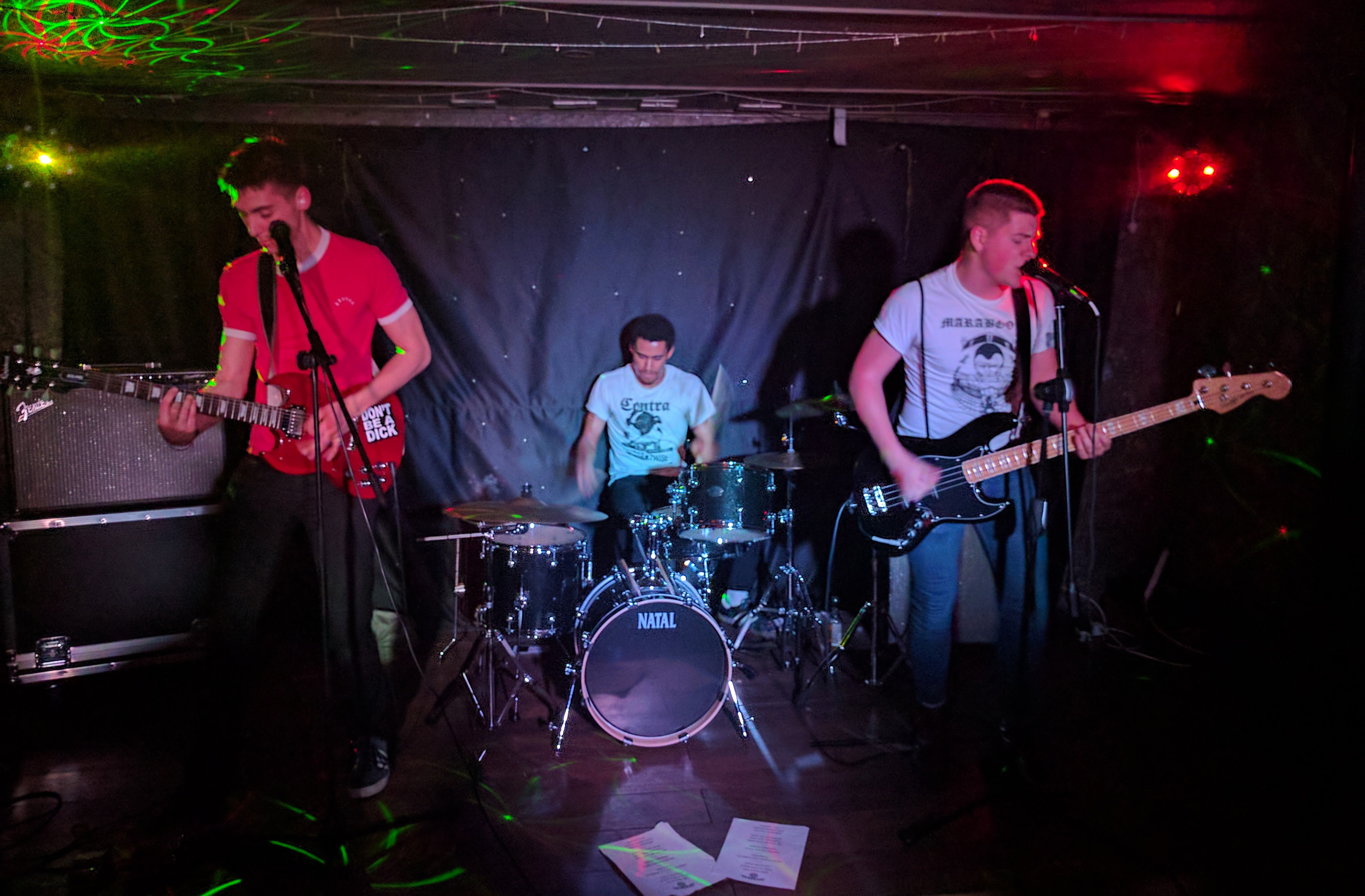
Grade 2 playing live in Ryde, Isle of Wight, 2017

=== Contra Records ===
From November 2013 until 2018 the band was signed to German record label Contra Records.

=== Hellcat Records ===
In 2018 Grade 2 signed with US-based Hellcat Records. In a 2023 interview with Matthew Rix, Sid talked about how the band almost didn’t get signed by Hellcat Records because of how drunk the band got playing a show with Lars Frederiksen and because of that he never wanted to see them again.

In 2026, Grade 2 released their fifth studio album Talk About It.

=== Live performance ===
Since 2013, the band have played regularly across Europe with performances in countries including Germany, Switzerland, Spain, France, the Netherlands, Belgium, Norway, Sweden, Greece, Italy, Ireland, the Czech Republic, Austria, Slovakia, Serbia, the UK, and the Isle of Man. From 2018 the band have also toured in the US and Canada.

During 2016 for some European live dates, drummer Jacob Hull was substituted by Ryde drummer Toby Jenkins.

In autumn 2018, Grade 2 was support for The Interrupters UK tour, and in spring 2019 the band toured as support for the Dropkick Murphys.

In 2022, Grade 2 supported Social Distortion in their EU Tour.

In 2023, Grade 2 supported Rancid across Europe and the UK, and Guns n' Roses for the event BST Hyde Park. Later the same year, they supported Generation Sex.

In 2025, Grade 2 performed at Victorious Festival in Southsea.

In 2026, Grade 2 toured the UK and Europe in support of their fifth studio album Talk About It. The UK leg culminated with a homecoming show at Strings Bar and Venue on the Isle of Wight.

== Discography ==
Studio albums

- Mainstream View (2016)
- Break the Routine (2017)
- Graveyard Island (2019)
- Grade 2 (2023)
- Talk About It (2026)

EPs

- Broken Youth (2014)
- Die with Out Boots On (split with Saints and Sinners, 2015)
- Heard It All Before (2016)
