= The Heart Attacks =

American glam punk band

- Origin: Atlanta, Georgia, U.S.
- Genres: Glam punk; punk rock; garage punk; rock and roll
- Years active: 2003–2008
- Labels: Brand Name; Hellcat
- Members: Chase Noles : Vocals; Tuk : Lead guitar Dave : Rhythm guitar Portwood : Bass guitar Vasile : drums
- Past members: Brad : Drums; Paulie : Bass guitar Amos : Drums

The Heart Attacks are an American glam punk band from Atlanta, Georgia, United States, and are currently signed to Tim Armstrong's Hellcat Records. In April/May 2007, the band toured throughout the southern United States as part of a Hellcat Records package tour. Later that year, the band embarked on an extensive East Coast tour that stretched from Florida to Massachusetts, and included a handful of dates in the Mid-West (e.g. Chicago, Milwaukee, Cleveland) as well.

Their first album, Heart and Scissor Killers featured all original members; Chase, Tuk, Dave, Paul, and Amos. The band was offered a place on the 2005 Warped Tour caravan but due to a scheduling conflict and unable to follow the tour, Amos was replaced by Brad, who became their steady drummer until 2007 when he made the decision to continue his education. During the Warped Tour, their bus broke down in California and with the aid of locals, they made their way back home to Atlanta. They also became acquainted with Tim Armstrong in this time period, and left Brand Name Records for a better-known label. The band released a more widely advertised album Hellbound and Heartless, in 2006, featuring a duet between Chase Noles and guest singer Joan Jett.

In late 2008, lead guitar player Tuk and bass player Portwood started a side project along with Joey from Vengeance 77, dubbed Poison Arrows. After lead vocalist Chase Noles was put into jail and bassist Portwood went back to rehab, the Heart Attacks called it quits. Now Tuk is playing in Biters while Chase has released music with Dinos Boys, and more recently with RMBLR (pronounced "rambler"), with Joey on drums.

== Reunion ==
The band has announced two reunion shows in their hometown of Atlanta, Georgia. On December 13 and 14, the band will be playing the Star Bar for two shows only.

== Discography ==
- Heart and Scissor Killers (2005, Brand Name)

AllMusic link

- Hellbound and Heartless (2006, Hellcat)

AllMusic link

== Links ==
The Heart Attacks on Bandsintown

== Sources ==
- The Heart Attacks at AllMusic
- Hellcat Records bio and tour dates
- The Heart Attacks, Lisa Sharer, PRICK Magazine, September 2006.
