= Andy DeMize =

Drummer (1983–2009)

- Born: Andrew Martinez; 1983
- Died: January 11, 2009 (aged 25–26) Outside Fullerton, CA, US
- Occupation: Drummer
- Years active: 2001–2009
- Labels: Nitro
- Formerly of: Nekromantix; Up Syndrome; The Rocketz

Andrew Martinez (1983 – January 11, 2009), known professionally as Andy DeMize, was the drummer for the bands Nekromantix, Up Syndrome, and The Rocketz.

== Career ==
Martinez joined the pop punk group Up Syndrome in October 2001; the band signed with Nitro Records in December 2002.

== Death ==
In the early morning of January 11, 2009 Martinez died in an automobile accident. According to reports by the Orange County Register, Martinez and three other people were in a 1972 Chevrolet Nova travelling south on Route 57 outside of Fullerton, California at roughly 85 miles per hour (137 km/h) when the driver lost control, swerved across all lanes of the freeway, went over an embankment, and hit a tree. The car caught fire, igniting a eucalyptus grove. According to police reports, Martinez and another passenger were killed while the driver and a third passenger escaped the vehicle and fled the scene, later calling 9-1-1 from a nearby strawberry field asking for medical help. The driver was arrested on suspicion of driving under the influence of alcohol, vehicular manslaughter while intoxicated, and felony hit-and-run. He and the third passenger were taken to the University of California, Irvine Medical Center where they were listed in critical condition.

Martinez's bandmates were quick to respond to news of his death. Nekromantix frontman Kim Nekroman remarked: "My thoughts and condolences go out to his family and everybody that knew Andrew. There [are] no words to describe the shock ... Andrew was probably the most loveable guy I ever met and truly [sic] the only person I've met in my life that was loved and liked by everybody [he] met." Tony Slash of The Rocketz remarked that "Andy touched many people, his heart was golden, his reputation as a truly nice guy was understated ... he was always quick to offer a hand or a beer. He was more than just the backbone of The Rocketz ... he was the bond that kept everyone together, he was like a son to me."

== See also ==
- List of drummers
