= Nervous Records =

British music label

Nervous Records is a UK rockabilly music independent record label. It was formed in 1979 by Roy Williams, a DJ on the UK rock'n'roll scene. Nervous Records is credited by many as the leading record label behind the emergence of the British neo-rockabilly and psychobilly scene in the early 1980s and released many of the earliest records by key British artists of the genre including The Polecats, The Sharks, Frenzy and Restless – as well as leading acts from other European countries including Batmobile (Netherlands) and The Nekromantix (Denmark).

Although not a musician himself, Williams produced many of the bands whose music he released. Williams introduced Producer/Engineer Paul "Doc" Stewart to psychobilly. Stewart was already well versed in rock, indie and punk and he took the music in a more modern direction, often co-producing with Williams as documented in the Rockabilly Chronicle.

== See also ==
- List of record labels
