= Psychobilly =

Musical genre that fuses rockabilly with punk rock

- Other names: Punkabilly
- Stylistic origins: Rockabilly; punk rock; garage rock
- Cultural origins: Late 1970s New York, California, Southern United States

Regional scenes
- Europe (particularly England, Germany, and Denmark), United States (particularly southern California), Japan, Brazil, Canada

Other topics
- Country rock; cowpunk; garage punk; gothabilly; horror punk; list of psychobilly bands; rock and roll

Psychobilly (also known as punkabilly) is a rock music fusion genre that fuses elements of rockabilly and punk rock. It has been defined as "loud frantic rockabilly music". It has also been said that it "takes the traditional countrified rock style known as rockabilly, ramp[ing] up its speed to a sweaty pace, and combin[ing] it with punk rock and imagery lifted from horror films and late-night sci-fi schlock,... [creating a] gritty honky tonk punk rock."

Psychobilly is often characterized by lyrical references to science fiction, horror (leading to lyrical similarities to horror punk) and exploitation films, violence, lurid sexuality, and other topics generally considered taboo, though often presented in a comedic or tongue-in-cheek fashion. Psychobilly bands and lyrics usually take an apolitical stance, a reaction to the right- and left wing political attitudes which divided other British youth cultures. It is often played with an upright double bass, instead of the electric bass which is more common in modern rock music, and the hollowbody electric guitar, rather than the solid-bodied electric guitars that predominate in rock. Many psychobilly bands are trios of electric guitar, upright bass and drums, with one of the instrumentalists doubling as vocalist.

Psychobilly has its origins in New York City's 1970s punk underground, in which the Cramps are widely given credit for being progenitors of the genre and the first psychobilly band to gain a following. The music gained popularity in Europe in the early 1980s, with the UK band The Meteors, but remained underground in the United States until the late 1990s. The second wave of psychobilly began with the 1986 release of British band Demented Are Go's debut album In Sickness & In Health. The genre soon spread throughout Europe, inspiring a number of new acts such as Mad Sin (formed in Germany in 1987) and the Nekromantix (formed in Denmark in 1989), who released the album Curse of the Coffin in 1991. Since then the advent of several notable psychobilly bands, such as the U.S. band Tiger Army and the Australian band The Living End, has led to its mainstream popularity and attracted international attention to the genre.

== History ==
The evolution of psychobilly as a genre is often described as having occurred in waves. The first wave occurred in New York City in the 1970s and reached Britain in the early 1980s, the second wave took place at the end of that decade and spread through the rest of Europe, and the third crested in the late 1990s with the genre finding international popularity.

=== Precursors ===
The wildly theatrical shock rock aesthetic of Screamin' Jay Hawkins in the 1950s, and the outsider music of the Legendary Stardust Cowboy in the late 1960s have been cited as a precursor to what would become psychobilly. The members of the Meteors and the Cramps both cited the song "Love Me" (1960) by the Phantom as the first song in the genre.

=== Origins in the United States ===
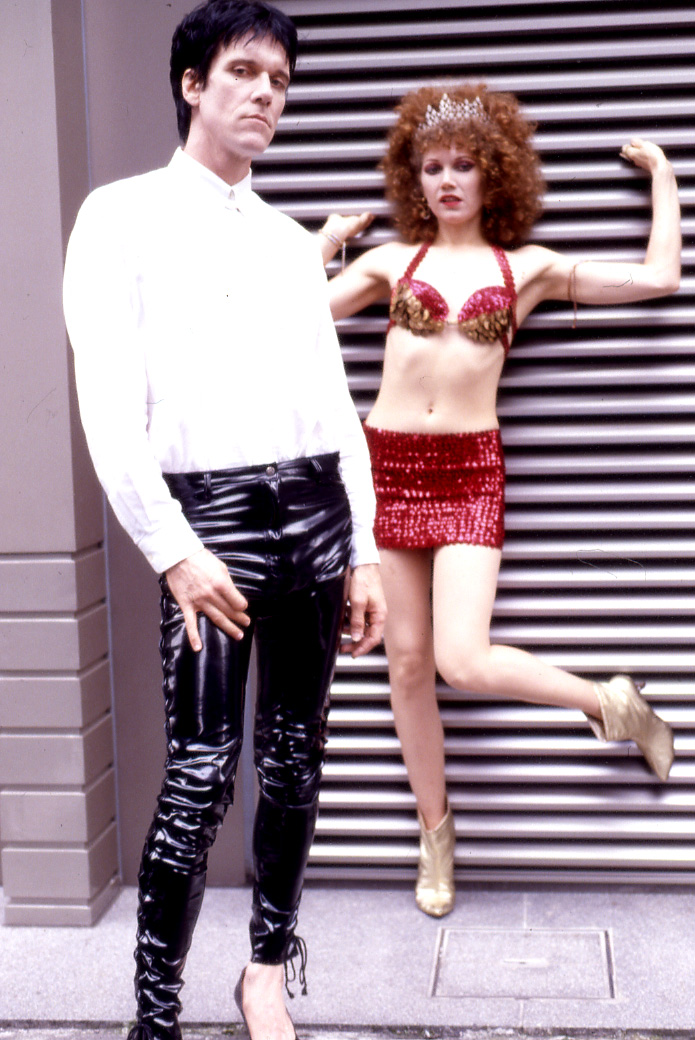
The Cramps are progenitors of psychobilly.

The Cramps weren't thinking of this weird subgenre when we coined the term "psychobilly" in 1976 to describe what we were doing. To us all the '50s rockabillies were psycho to begin with; it just came with the turf as a given, like a crazed, sped-up hillbilly boogie version of country.

We hadn't meant playing everything superloud at superheavy hardcore punk tempos with a whole style and look, which is what "psychobilly" came to mean later in the '80s. We also used the term "rockabilly voodoo" on our early flyers.

— Poison Ivy Rorschach

In the mid- to late 1970s, as punk rock became popular, several rockabilly and garage rock bands appeared who would influence the development of psychobilly. The term "psychobilly" was first used in the lyrics to the country song "One Piece at a Time", written by Wayne Kemp for Johnny Cash, which was a Top 10 hit in the United States in 1976. The lyrics describe the construction of a "psychobilly Cadillac" using stolen auto parts.

The Cramps, who formed in Sacramento, California, in 1972 and relocated to New York in 1975 where they became part of the city's thriving punk movement, appropriated the term from the Cash song and described their music as "psychobilly" and "rockabilly voodoo" on flyers advertising their concerts. The Cramps have since rejected the idea of being a part of a psychobilly subculture, noting that "We weren't even describing the music when we put 'psychobilly' on our old fliers; we were just using carny terms to drum up business. It wasn't meant as a style of music." Nevertheless, The Cramps, along with artists such as Screamin' Jay Hawkins, are important precursors to psychobilly. The Cramps' music was heavily informed by the sound and attitude of 1950s American rockabilly, including Hasil Adkins, whose song "She Said" they covered on 1984's compilation album Bad Music for Bad People, along with other songs from the Sun Records catalog. Their 1979 album Songs the Lord Taught Us is influential to the formation of the psychobilly genre.

=== First wave in Britain ===
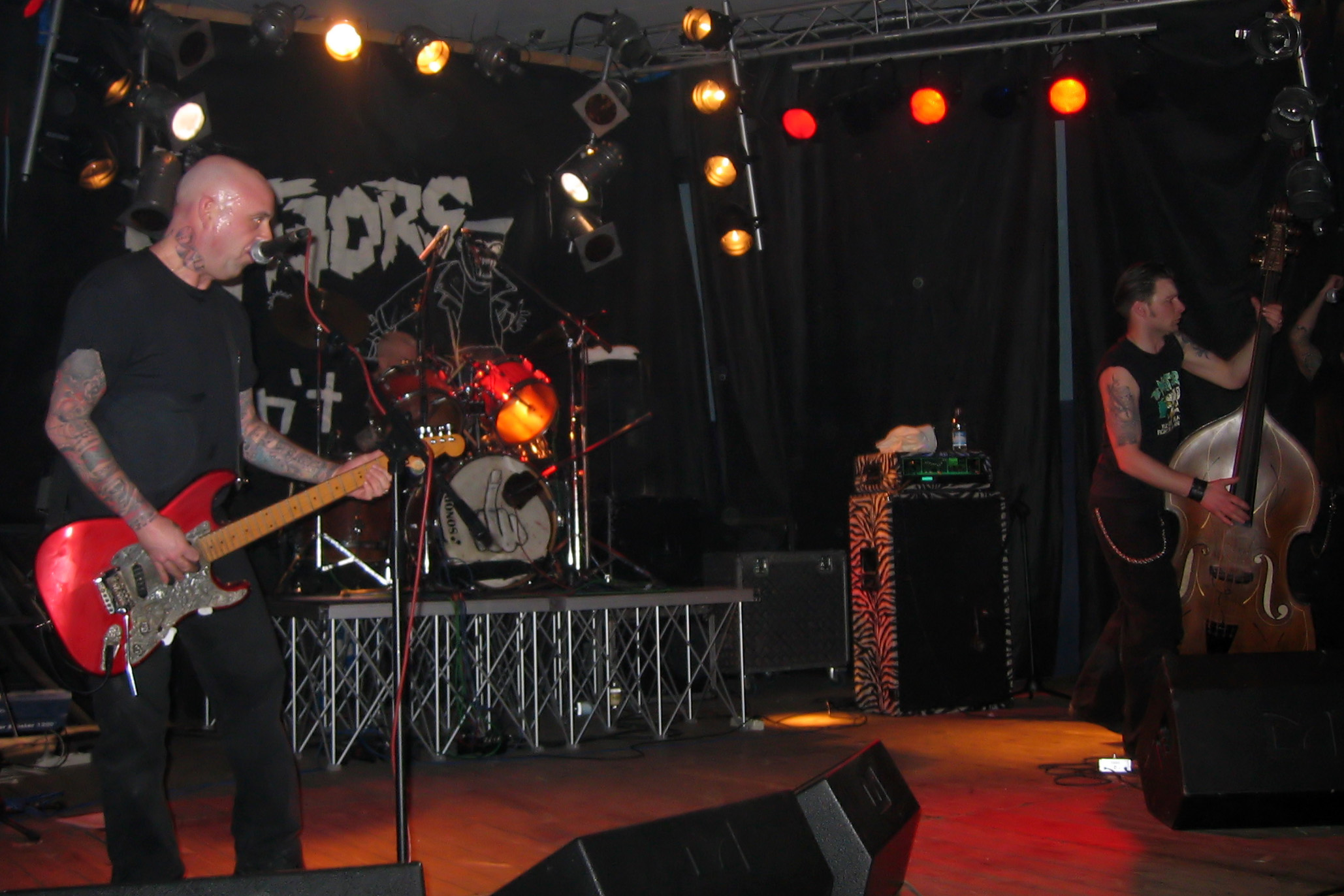
The Meteors are the first definitive psychobilly band.

Although the Cramps have been recognized as an "early" or "pioneering" psychobilly band, About.com calls The Meteors "the first true psychobilly band", noting their blend of the "themes of horror, punk and rockabilly". They were the first band to use the term 'Psychobilly' as a description of their music. Formed in South London in 1980, their albums In Heaven (1981) and Wreckin' Crew (1983) are recognized as landmarks of the early years of the genre. "Starting in the neo-rockabilly scene, the Meteors were quickly shunned for being too different. Excuses for exclusion from rockabilly concerts varied from the band having too extreme of a sound to their drummer having green hair." The Meteors blended elements of punk rock, rockabilly, and horror film themes in their music. Another commentator argues that The Misfits' "American Nightmare" may have been the first psychobilly song.

The Meteors also articulated psychobilly's apolitical stance, a reaction to the right- and left-wing political attitudes which divided other British youth cultures. Fans of The Meteors, known as "the Wrecking crew", are often attributed with inventing the style of slam dancing known as "wrecking", which became synonymous with the psychobilly movement. The short-lived Sharks, formed in Bristol in 1980, followed closely behind The Meteors with their influential album Phantom Rockers. King Kurt are a British band that formed in 1981 and reached number 36 on the UK Singles Chart in 1983 with "Destination Zululand". Demented Are Go are a Welsh psychobilly band that was formed around 1982 in Cardiff. They were one of the earliest in the initial wave of bands to mix punk rock with rockabilly, and as a result, are highly influential to the psychobilly scene. Another significant British band were the Guana Batz, formed in Feltham, Middlesex in 1983. Their first album, 1985's Held Down to Vinyl at Last, has been described by Tiger Army frontman Nick 13 as "the most important release since the Meteors' first two albums."

The Klub Foot nightclub, opened in 1982 at the Clarendon Hotel in Hammersmith, served as a center for Britain's emerging psychobilly movement and hosted many bands associated with the style. Johnny Bowler of the Guana Batz describes the club as "the focal point for the whole psychobilly scene. You'd get people from all over at those gigs. It built the scene." Representatives from record labels such as Nervous used the Klub Foot as a recruiting ground to sign up new bands. A live compilation album entitled Stomping at the Klub Foot was released in 1984, documenting the club's scene and the bands who played there. At the same time psychobilly bands were forming elsewhere in Europe, such as Batmobile who emerged in the Netherlands in 1983, released their debut album in 1985, and soon began headlining at psychobilly festivals and at the Klub Foot.

=== Second wave in Europe ===
The second wave of psychobilly is noted as having begun with the 1986 release of British band Demented Are Go's debut album In Sickness & In Health. The genre soon spread throughout Europe, inspiring a number of new acts such as Mad Sin (formed in Germany in 1987) and the Nekromantix (formed in Denmark in 1989), who released the album Curse of the Coffin in 1991. The Quakes formed in Buffalo, New York in 1986, but had such difficulty building a following in their hometown that they moved to London the following year, where they released the album Voice of America in 1990. Another significant release of this era was the compilation album Rockabilly Psychosis and the Garage Disease, which acknowledged the genre's roots in rockabilly and garage rock.

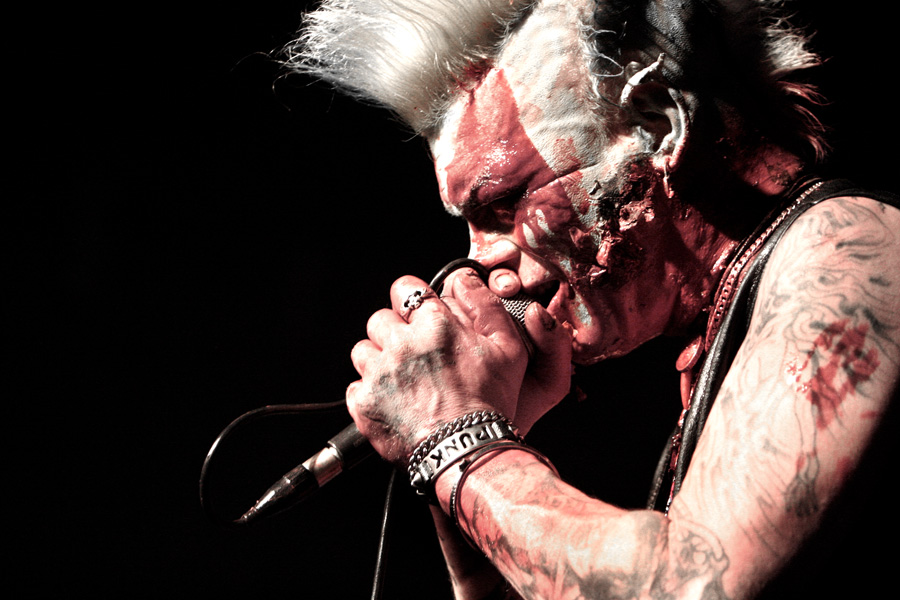
Demented Are Go's singer's stage blood make-up is an example of the horror-film schtick some psychobilly bands adopted.

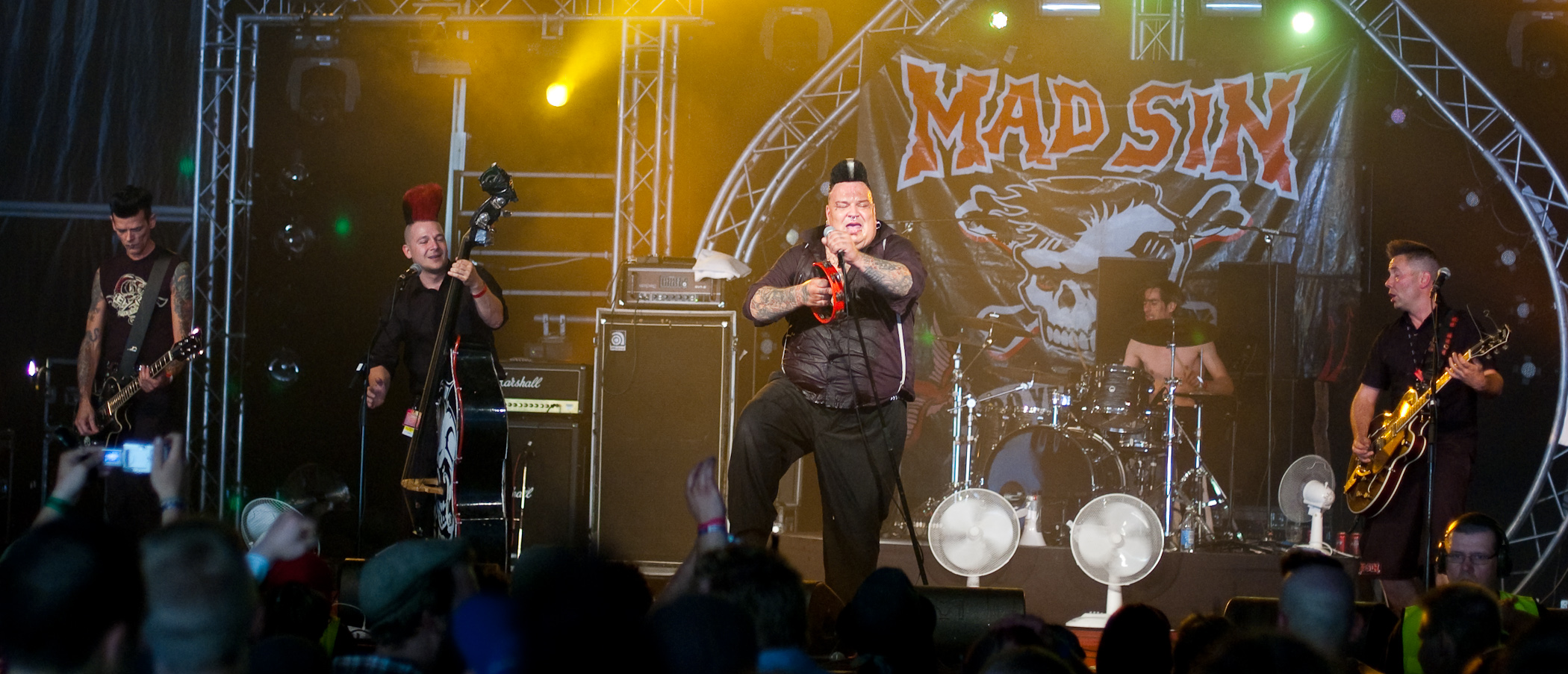
The influential German band Mad Sin in 2008. From a psychobilly fashion perspective, note the bassist's red-dyed pompadour and the guitarist on the right's crop cut sides.

The second-wave bands broadened the music's scope, with the introduction of new and diverse musical influences into the sound. Record labels such as Nervous and Crazy Love helped the genre to expand, although it still remained largely unnoticed in the United States, where the albums were poorly distributed and most psychobilly bands preferred to play weekenders than to tour. Nick 13 states that while other British youth trends such as scooter riding, the skinhead subculture, and 2 Tone ska crossed over to the United States during the 1980s, psychobilly did not.

However, one American act that emulated the style was The Reverend Horton Heat, formed in Dallas, Texas in 1985. Their 1990 single "Psychobilly Freakout" helped introduce American audiences to the genre. The band was heavily inspired by The Cramps, and original Cramps members Lux Interior and Poison Ivy have both identified The Reverend Horton Heat as the latter-day rockabilly/psychobilly band most closely resembling the style and tone of The Cramps. Horton Heat noted that the lack of audience awareness of the band was in some ways a benefit: "Somehow, as a band, we continue[d] to fly just below the radar of the whole music business. Which means we g[o]t to concentrate on being [touring] musicians, not recording artists."

=== Third wave internationally ===
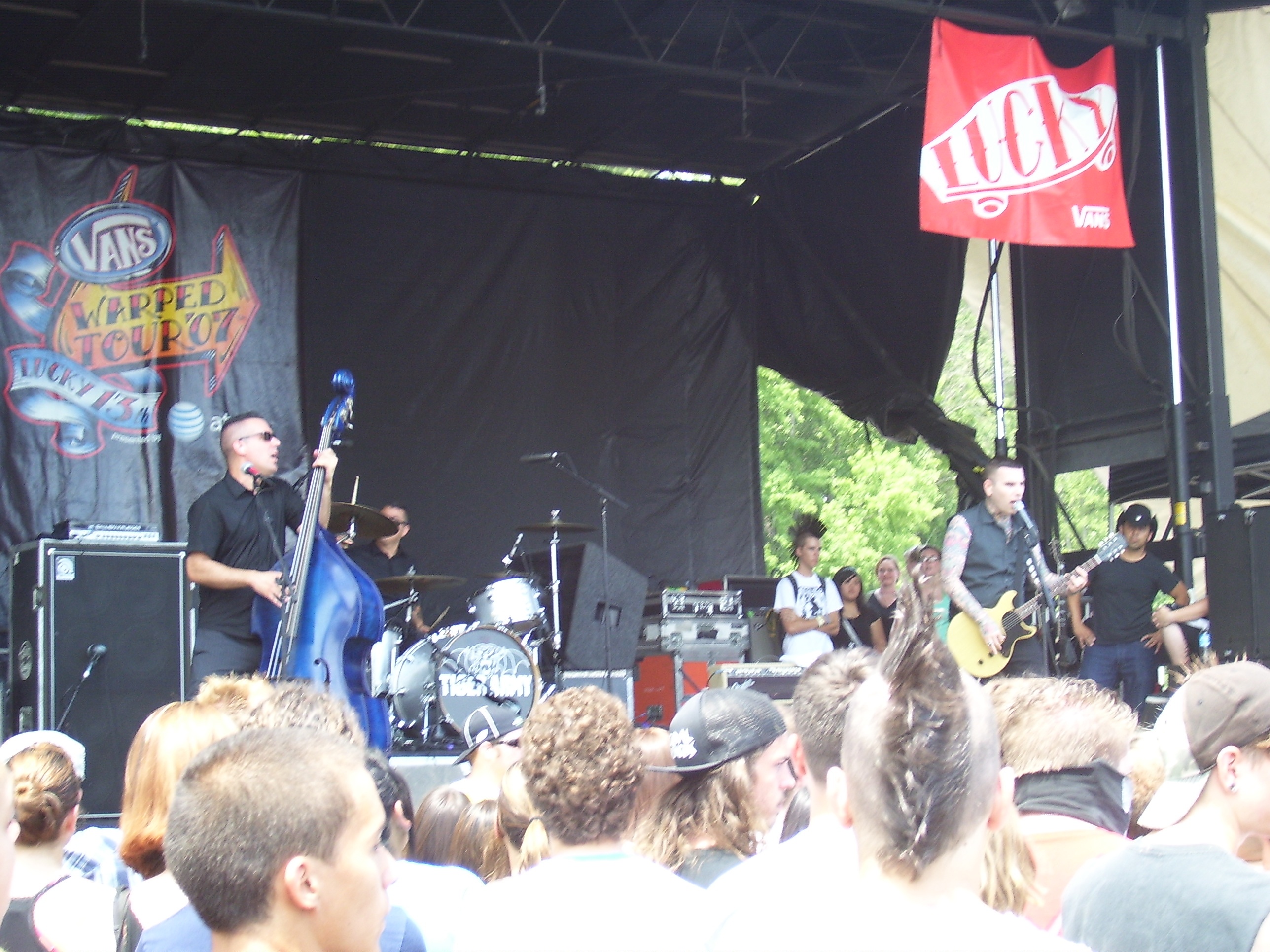
Tiger Army, shown here performing on the 2007 Warped Tour, are one of the most significant American psychobilly acts.

The third wave of psychobilly began in the mid-1990s, with many acts incorporating influences from genres such as: hardcore punk, indie rock, heavy metal, new wave, goth rock, surf rock, country, and ska. Psychobilly became popular in the United States, particularly in southern California, where punk rock had thrived and remained popular since the 1970s. The area's large Latino community, which revered early rock and roll icons, also played a part, as did the popularity of bands like the horror-influenced Misfits and country/rockabilly-inspired Social Distortion, as well as a celebration of hot rod and motorcycle culture. In the mid to late 1990s European bands Demented Are Go, Godless Wicked Creeps and The Hangmen each played their own US live tours, motivating the fledgling US scene. In contrast, there were US bands like The Kings of Nuthin' from Boston, who toured Europe extensively for several years.

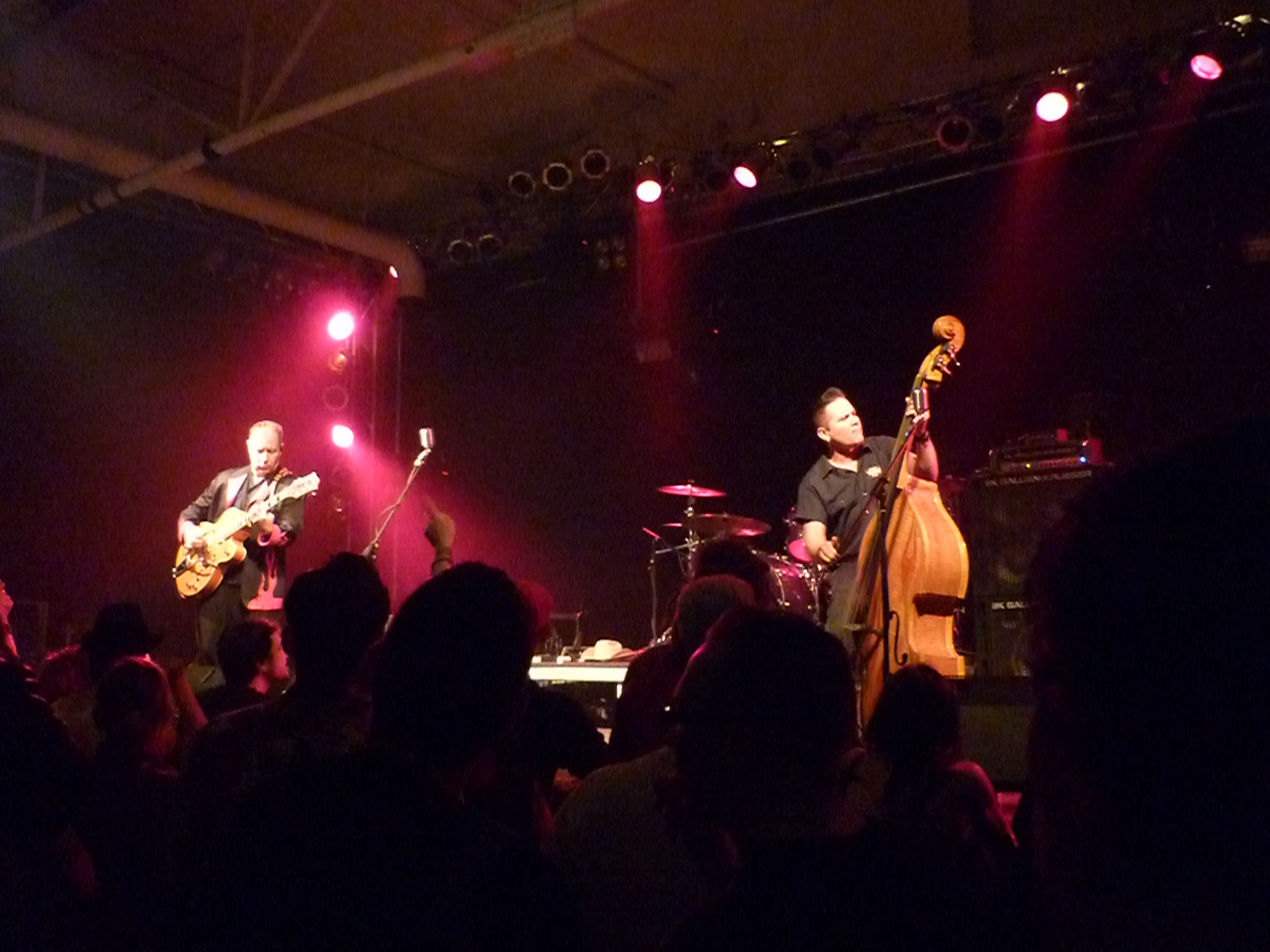
Reverend Horton Heat playing in 2010

Tiger Army, formed in Berkeley in 1996, became the dominant American psychobilly act following the release of their 1999 self-titled debut. Their touring in support of the album helped to establish a foothold for psychobilly across the United States. Los Angeles-based Hellcat Records, run by Rancid's Tim Armstrong, became home to many psychobilly acts, including Tiger Army, Devil's Brigade and the Danish groups Nekromantix and HorrorPops, both of whom relocated to southern California in the early 2000s.

Guana Batz members Pip Hancox and Johnny Bowler relocated there as well, moving to San Diego where they sometimes perform with Slim Jim Phantom of the Stray Cats under the name Guana Cats. Another notable California psychobilly band formed in the 1990s was The Chop Tops. They have toured with bands like German psychobillies Mad Sin and the Nekromantix, and have opened for the Dead Kennedys, Suicidal Tendencies, Dick Dale, John Lee Hooker, and Chuck Berry.

The genre remained vital in Europe, where new acts continued to appear. In 1992, the Kryptonix emerged in France while the Godless Wicked Creeps formed in Denmark the following year, The Sharks re-formed in Britain, releasing the album Recreational Killer, The Snakes formed in Italy in 2004. Psychobilly also expended to new continents Battle of Ninjamanz formed in Japan in 1994 and Os Catalepticos formed in Brazil in 1996.

In the UK however most bands had split up, The Hangmen – who had formed after the first and second waves – became reliant on live events that did not specifically cater to the much depreciated Psychobilly audiences, resulting in the genre being introduced to a wider audience and the band acquiring a more diverse following that included punks and bikers.

==== Canada ====
Psychobilly also spread to Canada. Stylistically, Déjà Voodoo (who sometimes described themselves as "sludgeabilly") and Condition, both from Montreal, are early forerunners of the genre. As early as 1983, both bands issued recordings that displayed the rockabilly and garage punk influences of psychobilly, as well as a lyrical tendency towards horror and dark themes, often presented with humour.

Although it was not acknowledged as such at the time, Montreal's Mongols likely came closest to true psychobilly. From the somber Cramps-ish original title track to the covers of deranged rockabilly (Hasil Adkins), fifties rhythm 'n' blues (via psychobilly forefathers The Sonics), sixties garage rock by Quebec teenage sensations Les Lutins, and obscure, off-kilter instrumentals (one by The Nautiloids), their mini-LP Sleepwalk (1986) runs the gamut of all the musical bases of the genre. In addition, a few years later, The Mongols had their only other recording, "Bébé Cadavre" (Cadaver Baby), included on the Lachés Lousses compilation (1990).

Edmonton's Dusty Chaps might also be seen as an early exponent of the style with the inclusion of their sinister "Psychopath of Love" on Nervous Records' compilation Boppin' In Canada (1991). Following in those tracks, in the mid-nineties, were Vancouver's Deadcats. Their guitarist, Mike Dennis, had previously played in hardcore punk bands The Bill Of Rights and Forbidden Beat. Besides his own band, Dennis also issued early recordings by Montreal psychobillies The Alley Dukes, and Bloodshot Bill – who is also sometimes associated with the genre – on his Flying Saucer Records label.

The Gutter Demons were a band formed in 2002 in Montreal, Quebec, who became one of the most recognizable Canadian psychobilly bands, their live debut came supporting The Hangmen from the UK on their Canadian Tour of that year. The Brains is a band from Montreal.

The Creepshow is a band from Burlington, Ontario, Canada. which formed in 2005; they write the majority of their songs about horror films. The Switchblade Valentines are a Canadian psychobilly band from Victoria. Big John Bates is known as "one of Vancouver's most notorious musicians" (Globe & Mail - Toronto). The band re-branded in 2011 as "Americana Noir" (a rustic offshoot of the dark cabaret genre) when the Gretsch-endorsed Bates was joined by Montana's Brandy Bones on Hofner upright bass and cello. Lauren Spike is a band from Toronto, Ontario, Canada, who have played many large shows such as Amnesia Rockfest.

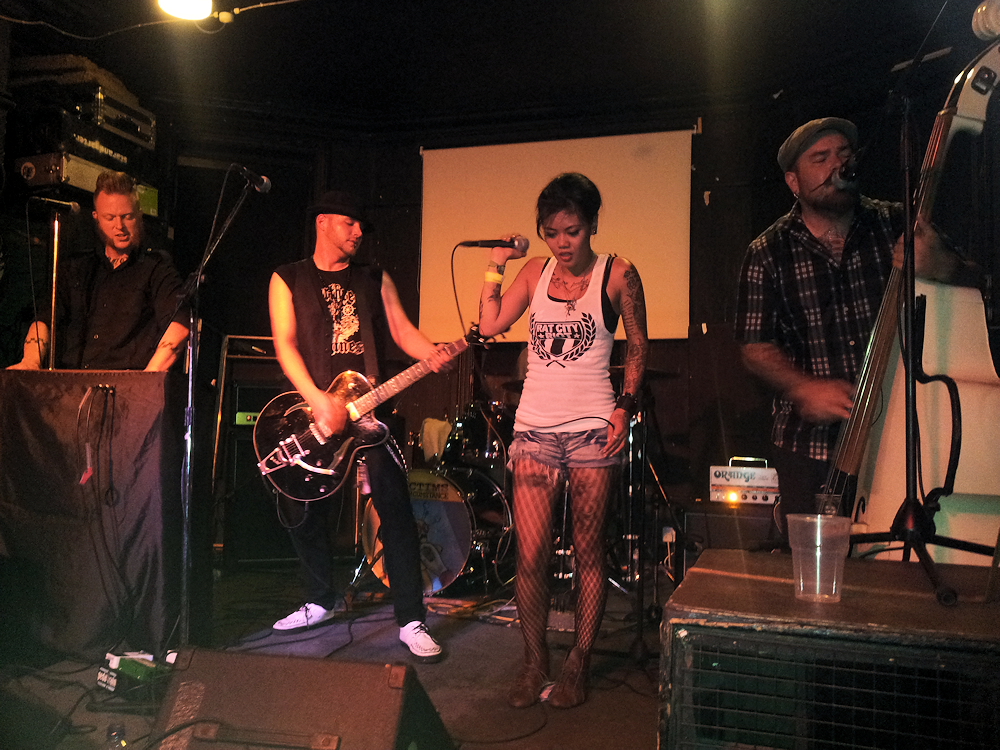
Canadian psychobilly band The Creepshow playing in Manchester in 2012

== Musical style ==
Musically, psychobilly is rooted primarily in two genres: late 1970s punk rock and 1950s American rockabilly. Tiger Army frontman Nick 13 explains: "The number-one misconception people have is that psychobilly is the same thing as rockabilly. Rockabilly is on the family tree, but it's a totally different sound and attitude." Psychobilly progenitors The Cramps acknowledge their music's deep roots in American blues, rhythm and blues, and traditional rock and roll. Alternative Press writer Ryan Downey notes that contemporary psychobilly also draws from other rock genres and subgenres: "Driven by the rhythmic pounding of a stand-up bass, the music swings with the snarl of punk rock while sometimes thrashing alongside speed metal or crashing headlong into country icon Hank Williams."

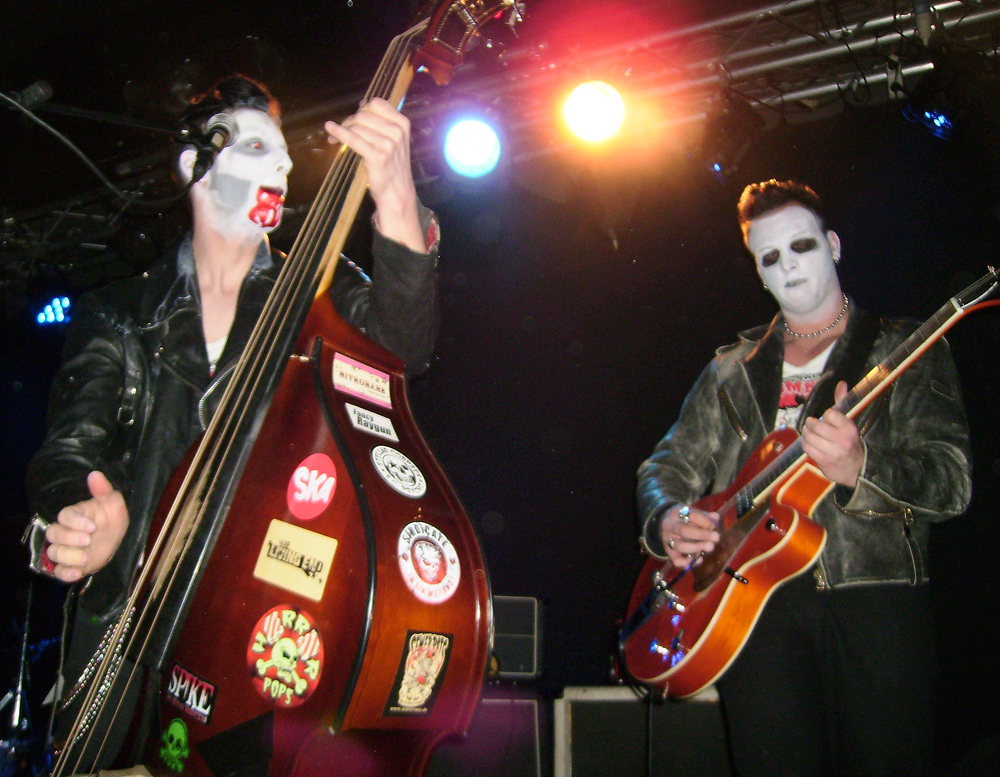
The Bloodsucking Zombies from Outer Space show the use of horror-film stage costumes and the decoration of the upright bass.

Craig Brackenridge lists other sources of inspiration: 1960s garage punk, glam rock, revival rock 'n' roll, and heavy metal. Nate Katz states that "[w]hile traces of glam, metal, and punk can be found in psychobilly, at its core, psychobilly emerged from rockabilly, particularly the neo-rockabilly movement [in] London during the late 1970s". Katz states that "The Sharks brought in elements of new wave music to their sound." Moreover, "[i]n the song 'Take a Razor to Your Head,' they clearly seek out those breaking away from neo-rockabilly into psychobilly".

Downey acknowledges that contemporary psychobilly's roots extend into 2 Tone ska, garage rock, hardcore punk, street punk and Oi!. Hilary Okun, publicist for Epitaph and Hellcat Records, notes: "The music appeals to fans of punk, indie, metal, new wave, goth, rockabilly, surf, [and] country." The influence of heavy metal on the psychobilly style resulted in the Nekromantix's 1994 album Brought Back to Life being nominated for a Grammy Award in the category of "Best Heavy Metal Album".

Psychobilly is commonly played with a simple guitar/bass/drum/vocal arrangement, with many bands consisting of only three members. Often the guitarist or bassist will be the lead vocalist, with few acts having a dedicated singer (e.g. Mad Sin and The Kings of Nuthin').

Psychobilly guitarists often play rockabilly-style hollowbody archtop guitars with f-holes and a tremolo bar. Guitarists may play punk-style power chords one moment, and then shift into rockabilly-style fingerpicking and rockabilly guitar-style seventh chords, with a heavy focus on minor chords and palm muting. Notes are often bent, either by pulling the string down or by using the tremolo bar. Gretsch hollowbody guitars are a popular choice. Guitarists often use 1950s-style tube amplifiers such as by makers such as Fender and it is common to see stacks of two speaker cabinets. As with rockabilly guitarists, the overdrive tone usually comes from what is produced naturally by overdriving the tube amp, rather than by plugging into a distortion pedal.

An upright double bass is often used instead of the electric bass found in most rock bands (though an electric bass is sometimes optional). The use of the upright bass is influenced by 1950s rockabilly and rock and roll musicians, particularly in the use of walking bass lines and the use of slapping. The bass is often played in the slap style, in which the player snaps the string by pulling it until it hits the fingerboard, or hits the strings against the fingerboard, which adds a high-pitched percussive "clack" or "slap" sound to the low-pitched notes. Kim Nekroman and Geoff Kresge are two examples of psychobilly bassists who have developed a rapid, percussive slap bass technique. This live Nekromantix song showcases Kim's rapid percussive slapping. This live Tiger Army song shows Kresge's rapid slap bass technique.

Psychobilly bassists often use gut strings, to get the deep, low 1950s tone. Like rockabilly bassists, psychobilly bassists often use both a bridge pickup and a fingerboard pickup, with the latter being used to pick up slapping and percussive sounds. Psychobilly bassists often decorate their basses by painting them with retro pin-up style images or designs or by putting stickers on them.

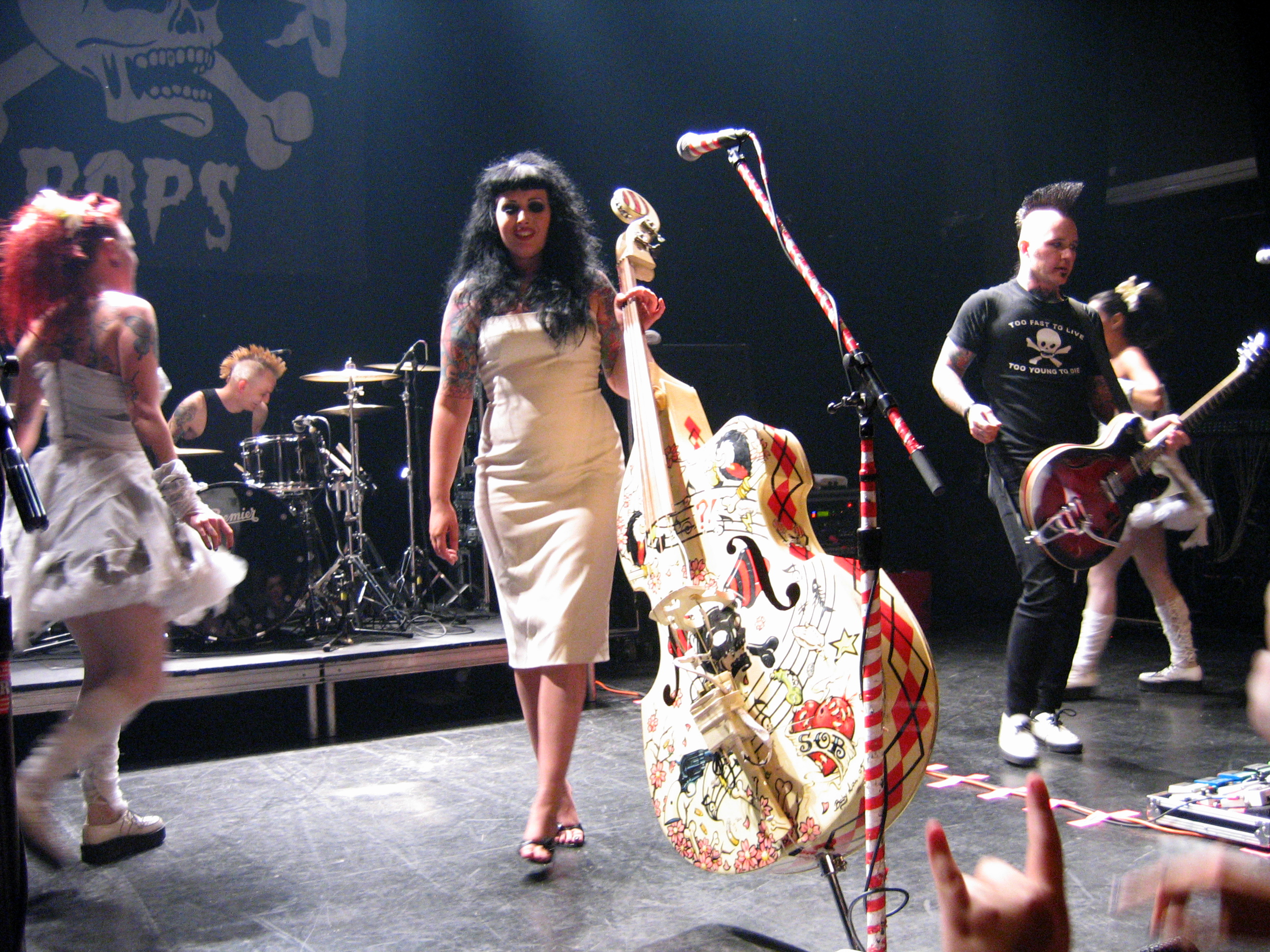
HorrorPops frontwoman Patricia Day plays an elaborately decorated double bass, a common instrument in psychobilly.

Some acts have made their upright bass the centerpiece of their stage shows; some psychobilly musicians elaborately decorate their upright bass, such as Nekromantix frontman Kim Nekroman, whose "coffinbass" is in the shape of a coffin, with a headstock in the shape of a cross. Nekroman created his original "coffinbass" from an actual child-sized coffin, and has since designed new models to achieve better acoustics, as well as collapsibility for easier transportation. Another notable act to use a coffin-shaped bass is the Brazilian psychobilly band Os Catalepticos. HorrorPops frontwoman Patricia Day also uses an elaborately painted and decorated double bass.

The Cramps performed without a bass player in their early career, using two guitars instead. They did not add a bass guitar to their arrangement until 1986, and have used an electric bass since that time. Cramps guitarist/bassist Poison Ivy sees this as one of the distinctions that separate the band from the psychobilly movement: "I think psychobilly has evolved into a gamut of things... It seems to involve upright bass and playing songs extremely fast. That's certainly not what we do."

Samantha von Trash's history of psychobilly lists 13 essential albums for people new to psychobilly: The Cramps: Songs the Lord Taught Us; Reverend Horton Heat: Smoke 'Em If You Got 'Em; The Misfits: Static Age; Social Distortion: Mommy's Little Monster; The Essential Johnny Cash; Cult of the Psychic Fetus: Funeral Home Sessions; Cult of the Psychic Fetus: She Devil; Demented Are Go: Satan's Rejects; 7 Shot Screamers: Keep the Flame Alive; Nekromantix: Curse of the Coffin; "Rockabilly Riot!" compilation; Thee Merry Widows' self-titled EP; Stray Cats: either Built For Speed or Rock This Town.

=== Stage shows ===
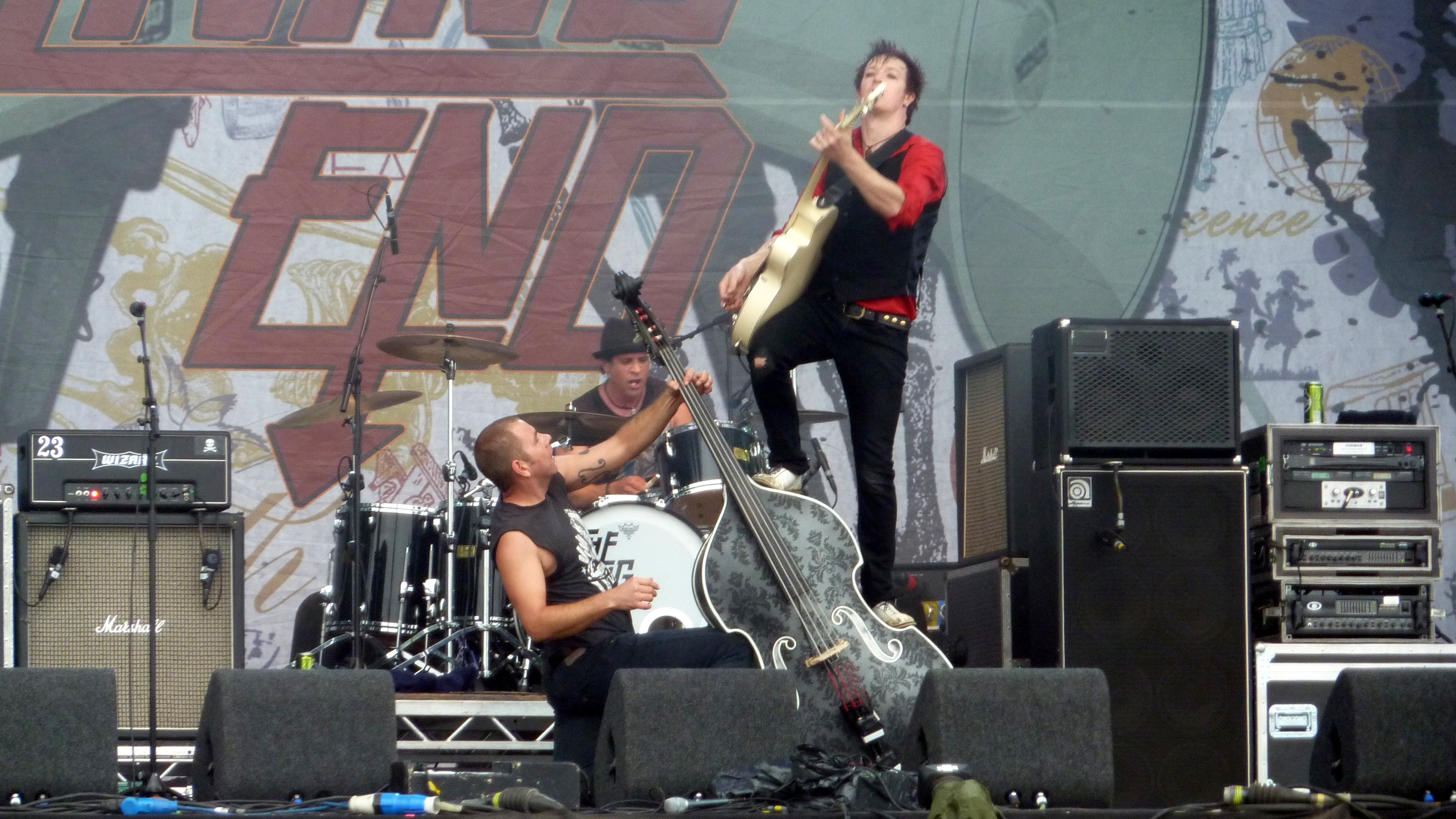
The Living End demonstrate psychobilly stage antics; in this photo, the guitarist is standing on top of the upright bass.

The performance style in psychobilly concerts emphasizes high energy and a lot of interactions between the band members and the audience. The HorrorPops sometimes switch instruments for fun, and Kim Nekroman does stunts such as playing the fingerboard of his Coffinbass with his tongue. The Kings of Nuthin' were known for their out-of-control performances with burning instruments. Demented Are Go are known for their wild stage show, which included simulated on-stage sex with a vacuum cleaner. The Australian band Zombie Ghost Train were known for appearing on stage in "zombified" clothes, featuring rips and bloodstains, and zombie make up, complete with fake stitches across the face.

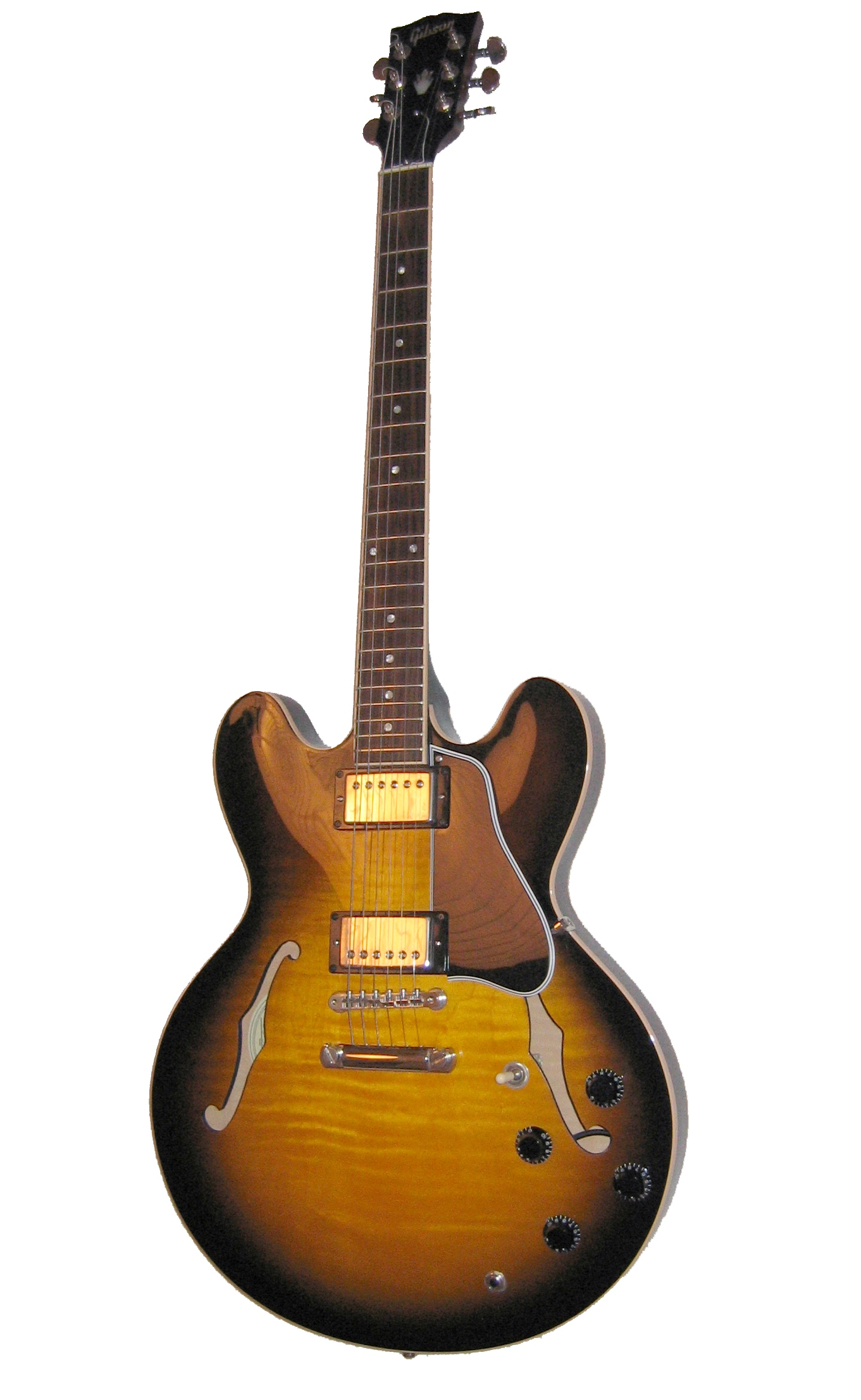
Psychobilly guitarists often play 1950s-style hollowbody guitars.

The Phenomenauts are known for their inventive and fun-filled live shows, which often include smoke machines, the Streamerator 2000, and various on-stage theatrics. Big John Bates was banned in one venue due to concerns about their overly risque stage antics. Deadbolt is known for its use of power tools during their live sets, and it is customary for the audience to be showered with sparks of red-hot metal during their live shows. King Kurt, a 1980s band, was known for its infamous "food fight" gigs, in which eggs and bags of flour were thrown around on and off stage and audience members were given free haircuts. "King Kurt had a bad reputation for doing things that would make people question the band's stability. These included going on stage in dresses, dressed as Zulus, and playing drinking games on stage. Tabloids often accused them of mixing drugs ... into whatever they made people drink on stage, tossing dead animals into the crowds, and rampant sex occurring as they played."

"At any psychobilly show, you might see some dancing... only, it's not your average dancing. That would be what's called "wrecking". According to wreckingpit.com, wrecking is more like a demented hybrid of "slam-dancing and freestyle wrestling". It's basically the semi-official psycho happy-dance, hence the Nekromantix song, "Struck By a Wrecking Ball"." "Originally, the dancing was known as 'going mental' – this type of dancing eventually became known as 'stomping', and then finally took on its official name: 'wrecking'". One definition of "wrecking" is "a strange form of dance that can best be described as a combination of slam dancing, swing dancing, and fistfights."

=== Lyrical style ===
Lyrically, psychobilly bands tend to favor topics and imagery drawn from horror, science fiction and exploitation films, violence, lurid sexuality, and other taboo topics, usually presented in a comedic or tongue-in-cheek fashion reminiscent of the camp aesthetic. Shawn McIntosh and Marc Leverette note that while rockabilly and punk scenes took their retro "nostalgia very seriously, striving for authenticity", in the psychobilly scene, the "aesthetics of kitsch, camp and cheese" are openly embraced.

Psychobilly bands drew on "all eras of horror, from Gothic novels and classic films to schlocky cold war flicks to psychological thrillers and splatter films." Psychobilly songs make reference to slashers (The Meteor's Michael Myers) and serial killers (e.g., The Frantic Flintstone's Jack the Ripper). Most acts avoid "serious" subjects such as politics. Original psychobilly act The Meteors articulated a very apolitical stance to the scene, a reaction to the right- and left-wing political attitudes dividing British youth cultures of the late 1970s and early 1980s. This attitude has carried through later generations of psychobilly. Nekromantix frontman Kim Nekroman describes: "We are all different people and have different political views. Psychobilly is all about having fun. Politics is not fun and therefore has nothing to do with psychobilly!" Nate Katz explains the rationale for psychobilly's apolitical stance as follows:

1980 was an important year for Britain. Recently elected Margaret Thatcher's policies led to a drastic decline in employment, especially among the blue collared and youth (Kim, 2005). A year later, there were five race riots within the London area... On a political level, London was incredibly tense. Fans of psychobilly (known as psychos) wanted none of this, or at the very least a break from the stress created by the political world. By establishing an unwritten rule that the music was to be apolitical, psychobilly music became a method of escape from the real world.

Katz notes that at the "same time [in the 1980s], the revival of the B-movie, particularly the return of horror movies, occurred...[,] such as The Howling, The Shining, a remake of The Thing, Friday the 13th, and An American Werewolf in London (All 80s Movies). Psychos gravitated towards these movies due to their lack of seriousness, mindless gore, and enjoyed the throwback to the original B-movies of the 1950s."

== Fashion and subculture ==
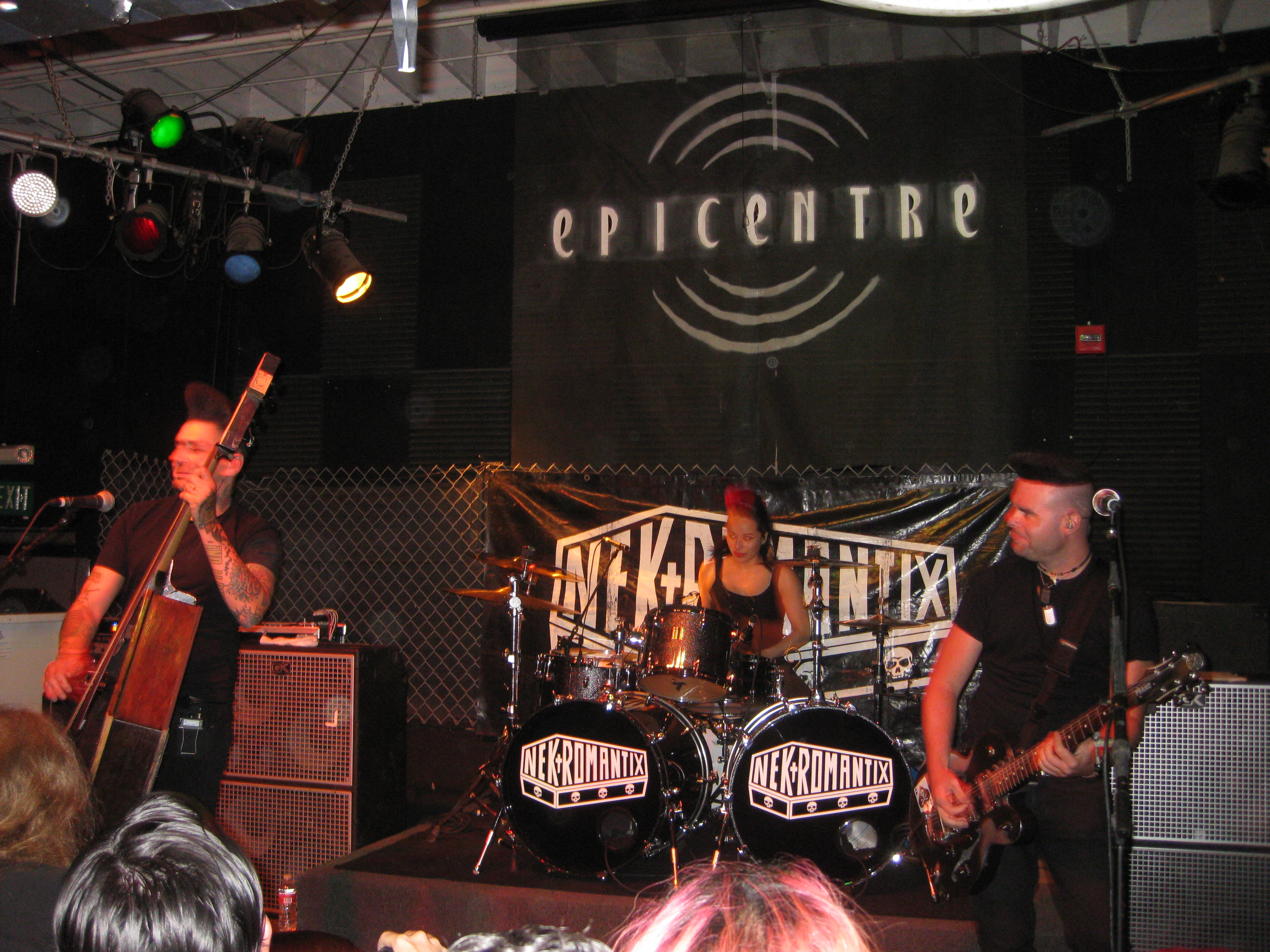
The Nekromantix, shown here in a 2011 show, illustrate several aspects of psychobilly fashion, including shaved heads, pompadour hairstyles, and prominent tattoos.

According to Nate Katz, "in its early days, Psychobilly relied almost entirely on word of mouth to be spread throughout London... If your friends did not know of it [a band or gig], the odds were that you did not either." The then manager of The Meteors, Nick Garrard, produced a magazine called 'Cat Talk' which was heavy on Meteors content & their new style of Psychobilly music. One of the band's original fans (Proff) produced gig flyers with a heavy horror/Frankenstein theme. Roy Williams of Nervous Records created a newsletter that would be passed around known as 'Zorch News', which allowed fans to keep up with psychobilly news that specifically related to bands involved with Nervous Records. "Despite being starved of the oxygen of mainstream music press attention for more than 25 years, psychobilly has thrived in the underground[,] building a network of fiercely loyal followers and producing a huge number of bands who each peddle their own brand of the genre." Fanzines are one of the ways the psychobilly scene created a social network, with Deathrow being the "...only long running psychobilly fanzine."

Psychobilly musicians and fans, who are sometimes called "psychos" or just "Psychobillies", often dress in styles that borrow from 1950s rockabilly and rock and roll, as well as 1970s punk fashions. Long "Old Mans" overcoats, army trousers, bleached jeans & Dr Martin Boots were all part of the early "Psycho" uniform along with band logo T-shirts. Heavily painted and studded leather jackets were also worn. This was topped off by a 1950s style quiff or flat-top, often bleached with shaved back and sides. Psychobilly band members of both sexes often have prominent tattoos, often with a vintage theme. Psychobilly "tattoos followed the same general notions as band designs, being highly influenced by the same movies. Common tattoos were images of the macabre nature such as bats, skulls, gravestones, as well as the occasional pin-up doll and band logo." The goal of the psychobilly scene member is to "live fast, die young, and leave a (not so) beautiful corpse."

Other aesthetic later influences include the scooterboy and skinhead subcultures, although not all performers or fans choose to dress in these styles. Scooterboy fashion includes flight jackets, mechanic's jackets, and motorcycle jackets. "Skinheads brought in things such as Doc Martens and pilot jackets ... [and] Punks brought in clothes such as the leather jacket and tighter clothing[;] Beneath the jacket was often a band T-shirt or a tartan shirt taken from rockabillies" Psychos often cut the arms off of their leather jackets, converting them into vests, and decorate the jackets with horror imagery or band logos.

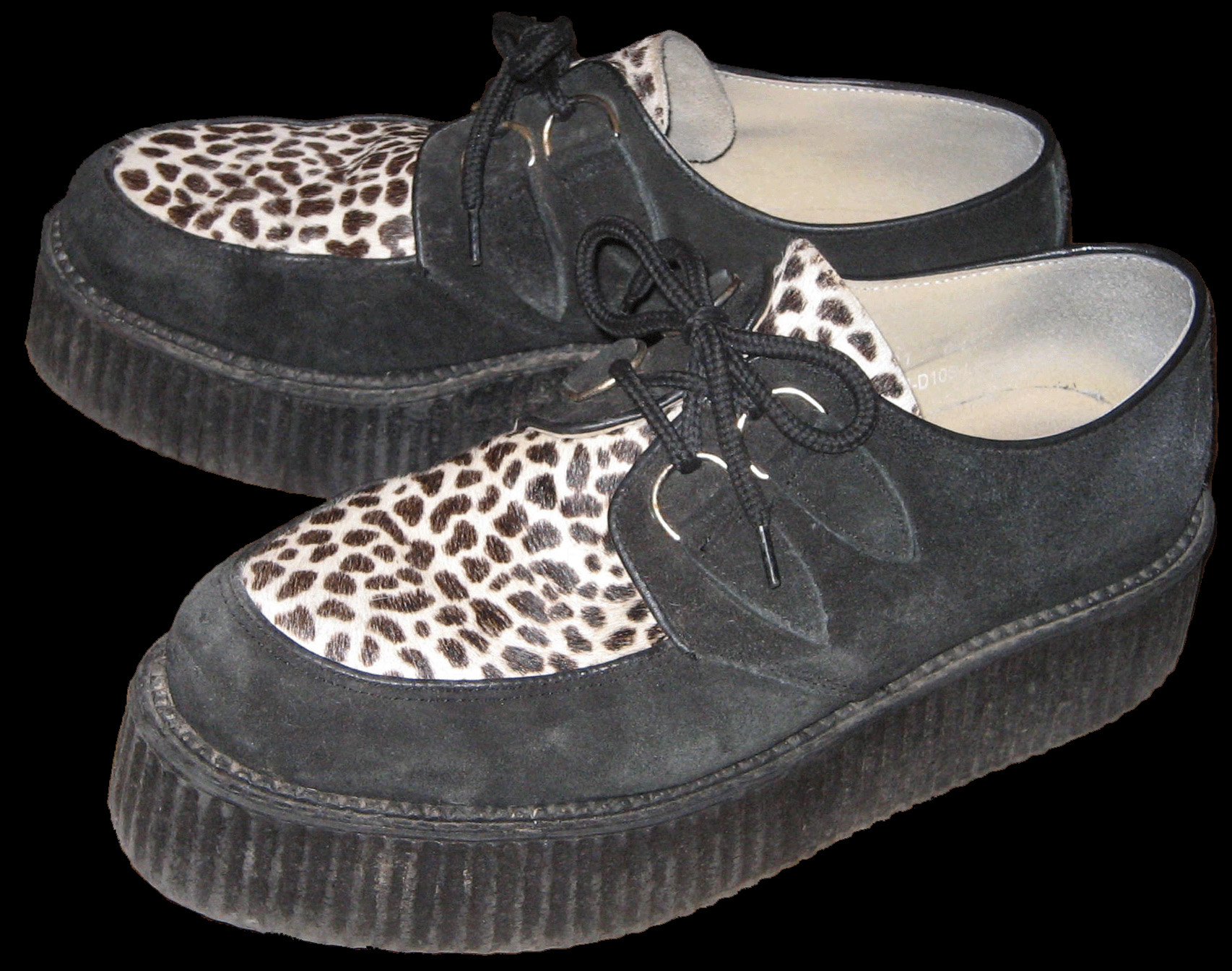
A pair of "double sole" creepers shoes often worn as the fashion of psychobilly musicians

Men often wear brothel creepers or Dr. Martens boots and shave their heads into high wedge-shaped pompadours or quiffs, military-style crops, or mohawks. The Sharks song "Take a Razor to Your Head" articulated the early psychobilly scene's code of dress, which was a reaction to the earlier British Teddy Boy movement: Teddy boys had long, strongly-moulded greased-up hair with a quiff at the front and the side combed back to form a duck's arse at the rear. The Shark's song said: "When your Mom says you look really nice / When you're dressed up like a Ted / It's time to follow this cat's advice / Take a razor to your head". "Like most hairstyles of the 1980s, things were taken to the extreme. People [in the psychobilly scene] tried to get their hair as tall as possible and brought in streaks of strange colors."

== See also ==
- Hasil Adkins
- Legendary Stardust Cowboy (Norman Carl Odam), Psychobilly pioneer
- List of psychobilly bands
