= Muddy Roots =

Music festival in Tennessee, United States of America

Muddy Roots Music Festival
- Genre: country, blues, rock and roll, rockabilly, punk rock, bluegrass, folk
- Locations: Cookeville, Tennessee, USA; Waardamme, Belgium; Adams, Tennessee, USA
- Years active: 2010–present
- Website: Official website

Muddy Roots is an American music festival held in Cookeville, Tennessee, U.S. It began in 2010 as an annual festival at the June Bug Boogie Ranch in Cookeville, Tennessee. The music festival included camping, vendors, a car show, and a pin-up pageant. In 2012, the festival expanded to Europe at the Cowboy Up Steakhouse Saloon in Waardamme, Belgium and featured the same blend of musical styles as the festival held in Tennessee. Muddy Roots announced a third separate festival would be held in May 2013 at the Red River Canoe Campground in Adams, Tennessee, called the Muddy Roots Spring Weekender. All of the Muddy Roots music festivals featured musicians of varying genres, including country, blues, rock and roll, rockabilly, punk rock, bluegrass, and folk.

Slowboat Films recorded a documentary at the festivals in Tennessee and Europe on the evolution of American music, titled Hard Soil. The film was released in 2014 and featured interviews and performances by some of the festival's acts, including Jayke Orvis and the Broken Band, The Goddamn Gallows, James Hunnicutt, and Reverend Beat-Man, to name a few.

== History ==
=== 2010 ===
==== Muddy Roots Music Festival ====
The first Muddy Roots Music Festival was held from Friday, May 28, 2010 through Sunday, May 30, 2010 in Cookeville, Tennessee, USA at the June Bug Boogie Ranch. Friday, May 28, 2010

- Stage 1: Wayne "The Train" Hancock, Dex Romweber Duo, Hellbillies, Kyle Turley, Mellow Down Easy, Hellfire Revival, and Smokestack
- Stage 2: Lane Kristian, Husky Burnette, Hillbilly Harlots, Jughuggers, and Cletus Got Shot

Saturday, May 29, 2010

- Stage 1: Billy Joe Shaver, Soda, Matt King, The Delta Saints, Travis Mann Band, Joshua Black Wilkins, Cashman, Tom VandeAvond, Dave Smith & The Country Rebels, and Pinup Contest & Awards
- Stage 2: Larry and His Flask, Cutthroat Shamrock, Pearls Mahone, The Staggerers, Jason & The Punknecks, Scissormen, and The Blackbelts

Sunday, May 29, 2010

- Stage 1: Hillbilly Casino, The Goddamn Gallows, Dash Rip Rock, Reverend Deadeye, Ten Foot Polecats, Sawyer Family, and Calamity Cubes

=== 2011 ===
==== Muddy Roots Music Festival ====
The second annual Muddy Roots Music Festival was held on Saturday, September 3, 2011 and Sunday, September 4, 2011 in Cookeville, Tennessee, USA at the June Bug Boogie Ranch. The festival added on a third stage for its musical and film performances.

Saturday, September 3, 2011

- Stage 1: Hellbillies, Wayne "The Train" Hancock, Soda, O'Death, Ronnie Hymes, Spinderellas, The Dirt Scab Band, JB Beverly and the Wayward Drifters, Don Maddox, Derek Hoke, Jayke Orvis and the Broken Band, Mark Porkchop Holder, and Cashman.
- Stage 2: Owen Mays, Viva Le Vox, Black Jake and The Carnies, Burlesque Le Moustache, Hellfire Revival, Bob Wayne, Possessed by Paul James, Lucky Tubb, Slim Chance and the Can't Hardly Playboys, Peculiar Pretzelmen, Cletus Got Shot, Calamity Cubes, Reverend Deadeye, Ten Foot Polecats, and Porter Hall Tennessee.
- Stage 3 (films): Behind the Burly Q, The Folk Singer, and Mink Cousins.

Sunday, September 4, 2011

- Stage 1: Wanda Jackson, Legendary Shack Shakers, Hillbilly Casino, Art Adams Band, Joshua Black Wilkins, Sean Wheeler y Zander Schloss, Davie Jay Sparrows, The Cheatin Hearts, Liquorbox, and the Pinup Pageant.
- Stage 2: The Goddamn Gallows, Rachel Brooke, Whiskey Folk Ramblers, Scott McDougal, Harmed Brothers, Hellbound Glory, Hans Condor, The Krank Daddies, The Dirt Daubers, Left Lane Cruiser, Cutthroat Shamrock, Thomas Maupin & Daniel Rothwell, Hogslop String Band, and Sunday Services.
- Stage 3: Highlonesome, Graham Lindsey, James Hunnicutt, The Dirty Dougs, Smokestack and the Foothill Fury, Last False Hope, The Perezze Farm, and Scissormen.

=== 2012 ===
==== Muddy Roots Music Festival ====
The third annual Muddy Roots Music Festival was held on Friday, August 31, 2012 through Sunday, September 2, 2012 in Cookeville, Tennessee, USA at the June Bug Boogie Ranch.

Friday, August 31, 2012

- Stage 1: James "Slim" Hand, Wayne "The Train" Hancock, Dale Watson, Little Jimmy Dickens, Don Maddox, J.B. Beverly & the Wayward Drifters, Owen Mays, and Hardin Draw.
- Stage 2: Viva Le Vox, Jayke Orvis & The Broken Band, Bob Wayne & The Outlaw Carnies, Bianca 13′s House of the Rising Sun Burlesque, James Leg, The Hooten Hallers, Cashman, Husky Burnette, Lone Wolf OMB and Filthy Still.

Saturday, September 1, 2012

- Stage 1: Reverend Horton Heat, Hillbilly Casino, ANTiSEEN, The Goddamn Gallows, Joe Buck Yourself, Calamity Cubes, James Hunnicutt, Last False Hope, Rockin' Kitty Pinup Pageant, Sean Wheeler y Zander Schloss, Valerie June, Slim Chance & The Can't Hardly Playboys, and Peewee Moore.
- Stage 2: Restavrant, Kittie Katrina with Syrens of the South, T-Model Ford, Possessed by Paul James, Robert "Wolfman" Belfour, L. C. Ulmer, The Immortal Lee County Killers, Left Lane Cruiser, Hellfire Revival, Kara Clark, Dad Horse Experience, Joe Huber, Pearls Mahone, Cutthroat Shamrock, and Hushed & Guilty.

Sunday, September 2, 2012

- Stage 1: Legendary Shack Shakers, O'Death, Dr. Ralph Stanley, Joshua Black Wilkins, Ramblin' Jack Elliott, Tom VandenAvond, Soda Gardocki, The Defibulators, Pinebox Boys, Rachel Brooke, Reverend Deadeye, Voodoo Kings Car Show, and DJ Vintage Rockabilly.
- Stage 2: The Reverend Peyton's Big Damn Band, Slim Cessna's Auto Club, Molly Gene Whoaman Band, The Dirt Daubers, The Pine Hill Haints, McDougall, Atomic Duo, Sarah Gayle Meech, Derek Dunn, Camptown Ladies, Everymen, DJ Gospel Country, and Sunday Services.

==== Muddy Roots Europe ====
The first annual Muddy Roots Europe festival was held on Saturday, June 9, 2012 and Sunday, June 10, 2012 at the Cowboy Up Steakhouse Saloon in Waardamme, Belgium. The European festival included many of the same performers as the Muddy Roots Music Festival held in Cookeville, Tennessee, USA.

- Performing Acts: Wayne "The Train" Hancock, Hillbilly Moon Explosion, Lucky Tubb & The Modern Day Troubadours, Bob Wayne & The Outlaw Carnies, Jayke Orvis & The Broken Band, Slim Cessna's Auto Club, The Hackensaw Boys, James Hunnicutt, Derek Dunn, Hollowbelly, Molly Gene the Whoaman Band, Reverend Deadeye, Cashman, Tom VandenAvond, Honkeyfinger, Heinrich XIII and the Devilgrass Pickers, The Buckshots, and Tio Gringo.

=== 2013 ===
==== Muddy Roots Spring Weekender ====
The first Muddy Roots Spring Weekender was held from May 10, 2013 to May 11, 2013 in Adams, Tennessee at the Red River Canoe Campground.

Friday, May 10, 2013

- Performing Acts: Possessed by Paul James, Jayke Orvis & The Broken Band, Joseph Huber, Lee Bains III and the Glory Fires, James Hunnicutt, King Automatic, Viva Le Vox, Call Me Bronco, and Tiger Blood.

Saturday, May 11, 2013

- Performing Acts: Blackfoot Gypsies, Joe Buck Yourself, Sean y Zander, Rachel Brooke, Dex Romweber Duo, The Hooten Hallers, Dash Rip Rock, The Immortal Lee County Killers, Left Lane Cruiser, White Trash Blues Revival, and That Spoonful.

==== Muddy Roots Europe ====
The second annual Muddy Roots Europe festival was held from June 14, 2013 to June 16, 2013 at the Cowboy Up Steakhouse Saloon in Waardamme, Belgium. Friday, June 14, 2013

- DJ Charlie Harpoon, The Dirt Daubers, Dad Horse Experience, King Automatic, Dylan Walshe, Mary Lee & The Sideburn Brothers, and DJ Koen/Andy.

Saturday, June 15, 2013

- Bob Wayne & The Outlaw Carnies, Possessed by Paul James, Jayke Orvis & The Broken Band, The Fuel Girls (with DJ Koen/Andy), Joe Buck Yourself, Viva Le Vox, Rachel Brooke, James Hunnicutt, The Jet-Sons Rockabilly Trio, The Booty Hunters, Big Bayou Bandits, Drew Landry accompanied by Julian Primeaux, and an open mic acoustic jam.

Sunday, June 16, 2013

- Tav Falco's Panther Burns, Reverend Beatman, Koffin Kats, an open mic jam, Tio Gringo, Lonewolf OMB, Heinrich XIII & The Devilgrass Pickers, Dinosaur Truckers, and gospel music with DJ Charlie Harpoon.

==== Muddy Roots Music Festival ====
The fourth annual Muddy Roots Music Festival was held from Friday, August 30, 2013 through Sunday, September 1, 2013 in Cookeville, Tennessee, USA at the June Bug Boogie Ranch. The line-up boasted the punk band Black Flag as one of its headliners, which was one of the band's first U.S. concerts since reuniting.

Friday, August 30, 2013

- Stage 1: Dale Watson, Whitey Morgan and the 78's, Larry and His Flask, Tav Falco's Panther Burns, The Planet Rockers, Good For You, Carolina Still, and Los Bastardos Magnificos
- Stage 2: Those Poor Bastards, Reverend Beatman, Joe Buck Yourself, Fifth on the Floor, The Hooten Hallers, Austin Lucas, Stuck Lucky, Phil Hummer & The White Falcons, and Filthy Still
- Stage 3: Delaney Davidson, The Tillers, Mikey Classic & His Lonesome Spur, Brownbird Rudy Relic, and Ray Lawrence Jr.
- Stage 4: Dead Soldiers, Nashville Burlesque Troupe, Dr Sketchy's Anti-Art School, We Juke Up In Here (Film), Voodoo Rhythm (Film), Kingdom of Survival (Film), and Lost And Found (Film)

Saturday, August 31, 2013

- Stage 1: Black Flag, The Monsters, The Goddamn Gallows, Deadbolt, Jack Oblivian, Sean y Zander, The Movie Star Junkies, Rachel Brooke, and Left Lane Cruiser
- Stage 2: Scott Kelly & The Road Home Featuring Mike IX Williams, Possessed by Paul James, Eerie Von, Danny B. Harvey and the Unholy Trinity, Hellbound Glory, Hellfire Revival, Last False Hope, John The Conqueror, and Grass Crack
- Stage 3: L. C. Ulmer, Joe Huber, Dad Horse Experience, Charlie Overby, Two Man Gentlemen Band, The Gallinippers, and Glade City Rounders
- Stage 4: Peewee Moore, Bob Reuter's Alley Ghost, Broken Spirits, Burlesque Le Mustache, Black Jake and The Carnies, The Harmed Brothers, The Gladezmen, Ten Foot Polecats, Hangdog Hearts, The Sterling Sisters, and Folk Singer (Film)

Sunday, September 1, 2013

- Stage 1: Shooter Jennings, Bob Wayne & The Outlaw Carnies, Red Simpson, Hillbilly Casino, Psycho Devilles, The Calamity Cubes, Joshua Black Wilkins, Joe Fletcher & The Wrong Reasons, and White Trash Blues Revival
- Stage 2: Possessed by Paul James, Dash Rip Rock, J. B. Beverley & Wayward Drifters, Otis Gibbs, Sarah Gayle Meech, Carrie Nation & The Speakeasy, The Sterling Sisters, and Rickett Pass
- Stage 3: Scott McDougall, Peewee Moore, Ray Lawrence Jr., Brownbird Rudy Relic, Slaughter Daughters, The Harmed Brothers (Duo Intimate Set), Rachel Kate, and Call Me Bronco
- Stage 4: Sean y Zander, Gator Nate, Cutthroat Shamrock, Muddy Roots Facial Hair Competition, Banjer Dan Banjo Workshop, Shooter Jennings' - The Other Life (Film), Dr Sketchy's Anti-Art School, Ms. Muddy Roots Pinup Pageant By Sabina Kelley, Charlie Louvin Still Rattlin' The Devil's Cage (Film), and Church Services
- Field: Classic Car Show

=== 2014 ===
==== Muddy Roots Spring Weekender ====
The second annual Muddy Roots Spring Weekender was held from May 16, 2014 to May 17, 2014 in Nashville, Indiana at the Valley Branch Retreat. Dr. Ralph Stanley announced that he will be retiring at the end of 2014; his farewell tour included performing at the Muddy Roots Spring Weekender.

- Performing Acts: Dr. Ralph Stanley and The Clinch Mountain Boys, The Good Luck Thriftstore Outfit, Jayke Orvis and the Broken Band, The Tillers, The Pine Hill Haints, Black Jake and The Carnies, Carrie Nation and the Speakeasy, Calamity Cubes, James Hunnicutt, Fifth on the Floor, Megan Jean and the Klay Family Band, Dad Horse Experience, O'Death, Strawfoot, Whistle Pigs, and Owen Mays.

==== Muddy Roots Europe ====
The third annual Muddy Roots Europe festival was held from June 20, 2014 to June 22, 2014 at the Cowboy Up Steakhouse Saloon in Waardamme, Belgium.

- Performing Acts: Sean Wheeler and Zander Schloss, Jayke Orvis & The Broken Band, The Pine Box Boys, The Ten Foot Polecats, Tio Gringo, Dylan Walshe, Heinrich XIII and the Devilgrass Pickers, Lou Shields, The Dinosaur Truckers, Mary Lee & The Sideburn Brothers, Pearls Mahone, The Red Light Rumors, Black Cat Bone Squad, The Booty Hunters, Filthy Still, The Chop Tops, and Voodoo Swing.

==== Muddy Roots Music Festival ====
The fifth annual Muddy Roots Music Festival was held from August 29, 2014 through August 31, 2014 in Cookeville, Tennessee, USA at the June Bug Boogie Ranch. Legendary Shack Shakers are reuniting for the festival after being on hiatus since late 2012.

- Performing Acts: The Sonics, The Blasters, Mudhoney, Bobby Bare, The Weirdos, Legendary Shack Shakers, Pokey LaFarge, Jimmy "Duck" Holmes, Possessed by Paul James, Sean Wheeler and Zander Schloss, ANTiSEEN, The Builders and the Butchers, Reverend Beat-Man, Goddamn Gallows, Elmo Williams & Hezekiah Early, The Tillers, Terry "Harmonica" Bean, Left Lane Cruiser, The Hooten Hallers, Lydia Loveless, Greg Garing, Blackbird Raum, Those Poor Bastards, Hillbilly Casino, J. D. Wilkes & The Dirt Daubers, Buzz Jumpers, James Hunnicutt, Joe Huber, A Man Called Stu, Husky Burnette, Lou Shields, Call Me Bronco, Dylan Walshe, Calamity Cubes, Last False Hope, Lonewolf OMB, T Junior, Joe Buck Yourself, Rachel Brooke, Whistle Pigs, Dead Soldiers, Viva Le Vox, The Hardin Draw, Hellfire Revival, Hangdog Hearts, Gravel Road, Matt Woods, Dave Arcari, Gladezmen, Ten Foot Polecats, Glade City Rounders, The Dinosaur Truckers, JT Oglesby, Richie Owens & The Farm Bureau, Rickett Pass, Gabe Zander, Woody Pines, Lou Shields, The Black Rose Phantoms, Everymen, Joey Henry's Dirty Sunshine Club, Clem McGillicutty & The Burnouts, The Misery Jackals, Tilford Sellers, Henry's Rifle, Sweet G.A. Brown, Imperial Rooster, Deadly Lo-Fi, Knox County Jug Stompers, Wicklow Atwater, Whiskey Hill Swillers, Madpolecats, and Tex Railers Doomtown.

=== 2015 ===
Muddy Roots Music Festival

The 6th annual Muddy Roots Music Festival was held from September 4 through September 7, 2015 in Cookeville, Tennessee, USA at the June Bug Boogie Ranch.

=== 2016 ===
Muddy Roots Music Festival

=== 2017 ===
Muddy Roots Music Festival

=== 2018 ===
Muddy Roots Music Festival

=== 2019 ===
Muddy Roots Music Festival

=== 2020 ===
Muddy Roots Music Festival

Muddy Roots 2020 didn't happen due to covid

=== 2021 ===
Muddy Roots Music Festival

=== 2022 ===
Muddy Roots Music Festival

=== 2023 ===
Muddy Roots Music Festival

=== 2024 ===
Muddy Roots Music Festival

=== 2024 ===
Muddy Roots Music Festival Buenos Aires Muddy Roots Music started a new festival in Buenos Aires, Argentina which happened 10/26 & 10/27 located at C.A.F.F in Buenos Aires Argentina

=== 2025 ===
Muddy Roots Music Festival

1st Band announced for 2025 on Thanksgiving 11/28/24 Amigo The Devil
