= Sjock Festival =

Belgium music festival

Sjock festival is a music festival in Belgium since 1976 (50 years ago). The festival draws a European crowd featuring Punk rock, Rockabilly, Garage rock and Surf music. The festival takes place every year in Gierle in the first or second weekend of July.

Bands that have featured at Sjock include: Monster Magnet, Dr. Feelgood, The Godfathers, The Fuzztones, The Adolescents, Radiohead, Mudhoney, The Sonics, and Dinosaur Jr.

== History ==
- 1976 (Sunday, 22 August): Risk – Korla Plankton – Treezeke – Piet Van Noppenen – Sandle Wood – Riverboat Shuffle – Schralen Tjip & Mussenschrik – Oregon Size
- 1977 (end August): Tails Blues – Mustang – Desperated Compagnie- Topas – Cassiopeai – The Count Bishops – Herman Brood
- 1978 (20 August): Hassle – Hubble Bubble – The Misters – Stage Beast – Herman Brood and His Wild Romance – The Kids – The Count Bishops
- 1979 (12 August): Treezeke – Scooter – De Kommeniste – Bintangs – De Kreuners – Wilko johnson
- 1980 (end August): Kazan – 'T He Gene Noam – The Parking Meters – Weekend – The Machines – The Kids – The Pebbles
- 1981 (end August): The Crew – The Boxcars – The Panamas – Toy – The Meteors – The String – De Kreuners
- 1982 (end August): The Gigolo's – The Chrome – Ex Hole – Jo lemaire – Scooter – TC Matic.
- 1983 (end August): Blanc de Blanc – Schmutz – 2 Belgen – Seven Roots -Lawi Ebbel – The Scabs – Allez Allez
- 1984 (end August): Ottomotto – Chow-Chow – Schmutz – Mighty4 & Rebels – Nacht und nebel – Arbeid Adelt! – The Bollock Brothers
- 1985 (18 August): Bra – French Painter Dead – Seven Roots – Arbeid Adelt! – Luc van Acker – TC Matic.
- 1986 (end August): Slight Return – The Establishments – La Muerte – The Skyblasters – The Masai – Dirk Blanchart – Dr Feelgood
- 1987 (16 August): Red Scarf – The Nights – De Kreuners – Big Boatsia – L.S.D.-Band – Dr. Feelgood – Disneyland after Dark
- 1988 (21 August): Venus Juices – Coyote & The Lost Dakota's – Blue Blot – Tröckener Kecks – The Godfathers – The Scabs – The Troggs
- 1989 (20 August): The Ratmen – The Wolf Banes – The Scene – The Nomads – Washington Dead Cats – Wreckless Eric & Band – The Fuzztones
- 1990 (19 August): The Sands – The Mudgang – De Kreuners – Plan De Man – Fatal Flowers – The Chills – Raymond van het Groenewoud
- 1991 (18 August): Cornerstone – The Candy Men – The Paranoiacs – Jack Of Hearts – Jason Rawhead – Claw Boys Claw – Tröckener Kecks
- 1992 (23 August): Thermos – Spo-dee-o-dee – Hallo Venray – Gruppo Sportivo – De Raggende Manne – Monster Magnet – The Selecter
- 1993 (22 August): Days Of Adversity – Ashbury Faith – The Romans – Tom Robinson – UK Subs – Radiohead – Aztec Camera
- 1994 (10 July): Spo-Dee-O-Dee – Terrorvision – Swervedriver (replaced 'The God Machine') – Wizards of Ooze – 35007 – Deviate – Stuffed Babies on Wheels
- 1995 (9 July): Feedback – Sin Alley – Batmobile – The Del Valentinos – Dildo Warheads – Such A Surge – Dub War – Zion Train – The Source Experience ft. Robert Leiner.
- 1996 (13 July til 14 July): Funeral Dress – Sheffield Wednesday – NRA – Skippies – GBH (replaced 'The Exploited') – Honky – Credit To The Nation – Propellerheads – Starfisch Pool.
- 1997 (11 July til 13 July): No Fun At All – 59 Times The Pain – The Romans – Benjamin B. – Undeclinable Ambuscade – Orange Black – Backfire – Hard Resistance – Victims of Society – Zion Train.
- 1998 (10 July til 12 July): Snuff – Snapcase – Right Direction – Liberator – Undeclinable Ambuscade – 'T Hof Van Commerce – Homethrust – Concrete Cell – No Complacence.
- 1999 (9 July til 11 July): The Toasters – André Williams é the Countdowns – Satanic Surfers – Discipline – The Seatsniffers – Sint Andries MC's – Concrete Cell – Convict – Jennifer Sucks.
- 2000 (7 July til 9 July): Cunzi – Green Lizard – I Against I – Stigmata – U.S. Bombs – Gluecifer – Shelter – The Internationals – The O' Hara's – Fifty Foot Combo – The Seatsniffers – The Whodads.
- 2001 (6 July til 8 July)Intensified – Nashville Pussy – The Forgotten – Peter pan Speedrock – Dead Moon – The Hotknives – Sixer – Smooth Lee – Magnum 500 – The Revelaires – Thee Andrews Surfers – The Highlighters – Mr Atom & his Protons – The Famous Fantastix – Senser – DJ Aphrodite – Millennium Kru – DJ Buzz.
- 2002 (9 July til 11 July): The Stitch – The Ewings – Cowboys & Aliens – Peter pan Speedrock – Action In DC (vervanger Orange Goblin) – Bronco Billy – Los Putas – The Heartaches – Blood or Whiskey – Gasolheads – U.S. Bombs – Down by Law – The Bellrays – New Bomb Turks – The Moe Green Specials – The Highlighters – Fifty Foot Combo – The Arousers – DJ Carl – Hetten Des – Speedball JR – Los Banditos – The Seatsniffers – Big John Bates & the Voodoo Dollz.
- 2003 (12 July til 14 July): The Revolvers – Convict – NRA – The Atomic Bitchwax – Nashville Pussy – No Comply – Funeral Dress – Groovie Ghoulies – Nerf Herder – Triggerfinger – The Cherry Valence – Roger Miret & the Disasters – Nine Pound Hammer – The Mudmen – The Starlite Wranglers – Speedball JR – The Phantom Rockers – The Bamboo Apple Cutters – The Famous Fantastix – The Chrome Daddies – Reef Rider – Number Nine – Hot Boogie Chillun.
- 2004 (9 July til 11 July): The Flaming Sideburns – Street Dogs – Electric Eel Shock – The Bones – The Heartaches – The Nomads – Zeke – Dozer – Fifty Foot Combo – Speedealer – Raging Slab – El Guapo Stuntteam – The Killbots – Mean Devils – The O' Haras – Hubcap – Melltown – Jack Baymoore & The bandits – Boppin Steve & the Playtones – Hetten Des – Slipmates – Kaiser Bill's Batmen – The Baboons.
- 2005 (8 July til 10 July): Bad Preachers – Black Rodeo – Roddy Radiation & the Skabilly Rebels – The Priscillas – White Cowbell Oklahoma – Sweet Poison – ADD – Hetten Des – The Gecko Brothers – The Dell Valentinos – Judasville – Cosmic Psychos – Nashville Pussy – The Rhumba Kings – Runnin' Wild – Sebi Lee – The Million Dollar Sunrise – The Seatsniffers – The Ghosttones – Miss Mary Ann & the Ragtime Wranglers – The Phantom Four – The Round Up Boys – The Houserockers – Smokestack Lightnin' – Big Sandy & his Fly-Rite Boys.
- 2006 (7 July til 9 July): Peter Pan Speedrock – The Real Mckenzies – The Toasters – Boozed – The Last Vegas – The BossHoss – The Kings of Nuthin' – Tokyo Sex destruction – Lords Of Altamont – Bob Log III – Dunlop Devils (winner of the Sjock Sjowcase) – Captain Murphy – Interfear – Rayburn Anthony – 49 Special – 45 RPM – Catslappin' Chrissy – The Stacy Cats – Moonshine Reunion – The Buckshots – the Taildraggers – Velvetone – Wailin' Elroys – Paul Ansel's Nummer Nine.
- 2007 (6 July til 8 July): The Kids – Triggerfinger – The Bones – Tokyo Dragons – Dirty Fuzz – Mudhoney – Nine Pound Hammer – Nebula – Rawönes – El Guapo Stuntteam – Mother Superior – Ray Collins Hot Club – The Mad men – The Baboons – Big Bayou Bandits – Al & The Black Cats – Los Fabulous Frankies – Spoo-Dee-O-Dee – Miss Ruby Ann – The Nu Niles – Truly Lover Trio ft Dawn Shipley – lawen Stark & The Slideboppers.
- 2008 (11 July til 13 July): The Sonics – The Monsters – The Andrews Surfers Royale – Reverend Beat-Man – The Black Box Revelation (vervanger DKT/MC5) – The Bellrays – The Dwarves – The real McKenzies – The Turbo AC's – Le Chat Noir – Wanda Jackson & The Seatnsiffers – The Big Four – The Hillbilly Boogiemen – Randy Rich & The Poor Boys – The Slipmates – Smokestack Lightnin' – Miss Ruby Ann & the Roundup Boys – Cherry casino & The Gamblers – The Dunlop Devils – Charlie Roy and his Black Mountain Boys.
- 2009 (10 July til 12 July): Batmobile – Mad Sin – The Grave Brothers – Supersuckers – Mike Sanchez – Southern Culture On The Skids – The Jim Jones Revue – Eddie Spaghetti – The Starliters – Reno Divorce – Carlos and the Bandidos – Smooth and the Bully Boys – Paceshifters – Turbonegro – Deke Dickerson & the Eccofonics – New Bomb Turks – James Intveld – Untamed Youth – The Gories – The Oblivians – Domestic Bumblebees – Boppin Steve – Harmonica Sam – The Spades – The Bellhops – Casablanca Carambol Company.
- 2010 (9 July til 11 July): The Swampy's – Frenzy- The Meteors – The Grit – Johnny Trouble & The Rambling Men – Knucklebone Oscar – The Barbwires – The Legendary Shack Shakers – Sue Moreno & the Antwerp Allstars – Peter Pan Speedrock – Luis And The Wildfires – Reverend Horton Heat – Big sandy and his Fly Rite Boys – The Darnell Woodies – The Paranoiacs – The ragtime Wranglers – The A-Bones – Moonshine Reunion – Pat Todd & the Rankoutsiders – The Seatsniffers -The Jim Jones Revue – The dragtones – The Fleshtones – The Paladins – Rocketroom Rhythm & Blues revival featuring Howlin Pelle.
- 2011 (8 July til 10 July): Danko Jones – Nashville Pussy – Guana Batz – Legendary Shack Shakers – The BossHoss – Miss Mary Ann and The Ragtime Wranglers – Guitar Wolf – Spellbound – The Jim Jones Revue – US Bombs – The Sore Losers – Kieron McDonald Combo – JD Mc Pherson – Moonlight Trio – Reno Divorce – Mischief! – Carl and The Rhythm All Stars – Kitty in a Casket – The Mahones – .357 String Band – Rudy La Crioux and The Allstars – Union Avenue – The Adolescents – The Caezars – Voodoo Swing – Suzette and The Neon Angels – The Cheaterslicks – Marc and The Wild-ones – The Four Slicks – Cellophane Suckers – Cave On Fire.
- 2012 (6 July til 8 July): Hank 3 – The Nomads – Bob Wayne and the Outlaw Carnies – The John Spencer Blues Explosion – The Fuzztones – The Blasters – Gizelle – The Bellfuries – The Rob Ryan Roadshow – The Urban Voodoo Machine – Fifty Foot Combo – The Spivs – Moonshine Reunion – The Dirt Daubers – Voodoo Swing – Demented Are Go – Frantic Flintstones – Cenobites – Hipbone Slim And The Kneetremblers – The Lonesome Drifters – Thee Vicars – Hetten Des – The Bad Backbones – Knocksville – Kneejerk Reactions – Jizzlobbers – The Dirty Denims – Kings of Outer Space – The Sonic Beat Explosion – Rebel Yell.
- 2013 (5 July til 7 July): Dinosaur Jr. – Los Straitjackets – Deke Dickerson and the Ecco-Fonics – Black Lips – Paul Ansells Number Nine – The Jim Jones Revue – Wildfire Willie and the Ramblers – Rival Sons – Lang Tall Texans – New Bomb Turks – Throw Rag – The Caravans – The John Lewis Trio – The Baboons – Swinging Utters – The Experimental Tropic Blues Band – Jack Rabbit Slim – Sean and Zander – Bloodlights – Smokestack Lightning – John Coffey – The Rumblejetts – The Ladykillers – Crystal and Runnin' wild – Black Up – The Hi Stars – The Snookys – Adios Pantalones – The Lucky Devils.
- 2014 (11 July til 13 July): The Jon Spencer Blues Explosion – The Paladins – The Sonics – The Bronx – Nekromantix – Los Fabulous Frankies – Bob Wayne – Cosmic Psychos – Peter Pan Speedrock – The Spunyboys – Psycho 44 – Daddy Long Legs – Restless – Slim Cessna's Auto Club – 56 Killers – King Salami and the Cumberland 3 – Big Sandy and his Fly-Rite Boys – The Reverend Peyton's Big Damn Band – Carolina & Her Rhythm Rockets – Lords of Altamont – Raketkanon – Koffin Kats – Marc & The Wild Ones – The Generators – The Delta Bombers – King Hiss – Nico Duportal & his rhythm dudes – Voodoo Swing – The Montesas – Astro Zombies – Boogie Beasts – The Horny Horses – Poncharello.
- 2015 (10 July til 12 July): The Hives – Imelda May – Reverend Horton Heat – Backyard Babies – Southern Culture on the Skids – Heavy Trash – La Muerte – The Sweden Special feat. Domestic Bumblebees and Harmonica Sam – Fifty Foot Combo – Batmobile – The Fleshtones – Lisa and the Lips – Pat Capocci – The Sharks – Bloodshot Bill – The Rhythm Shakers – The Space Cadets – Black Mambas – Jake Calypso and his Red Hot – Walter Broes and the Mercenaries – The Country Side of Harmonica Sam – John Coffey – The Bloodhounds – The Deaf – Jay Malano and the Rhythm Dudes – Annita and the Starbombers – The Barnstompers – The Tinstars feat. Ruby Pearl – OFF! – Powersolo – The Cheaterslicks – Cuda – The Big Time Bossmen – The Backseat Boppers – The Vibromatics – Destroy-Oh-Boy – Id!ots – Hometown Gamblers – The Grave Brothers – We're Wolves.
- 2016 (8 July til 10 July): Flogging Molly – The Mavericks – Danko Jones – Sturgill Simpson – Pokey LaFarge – Radio Birdman – The Nomads – The Bronx – The Devil Makes Three – The Bellfuries – Supersuckers – Turbo AC's – The Polecats – The Hillbilly Moon Explosion – Flat Duo Jets – Kid Congo and the Pink Monkey Birds – Roy Thompson and the Mellow Kings – Darrel Higham and the Enforcers – Miss Lily Moe – Peter Pan Speedrock – Equal Ediots – Smokestack Lightnin' – The Rob Ryan Roadshow – Drugstore Cowboys – Mike Bell and the Belltones – The Offenders – Mischief! – Big Time Bossmen – Los Blancos – The Agitators – The Kieron McDonald Combo – The Baboons – Fuzzy Vox – The Buckshots – Rollmops – Alabasterds – The Devilles – The Fuckin Godoys – Fields of Troy – The Father, the son and the holy Simon – Aloha Sluts.
- 2017, 2018, 2019, 2020, 2021, 2022, 2023, 2024, 2025, 2026.
