= The Hooten Hallers =

American blues and rock and roll band

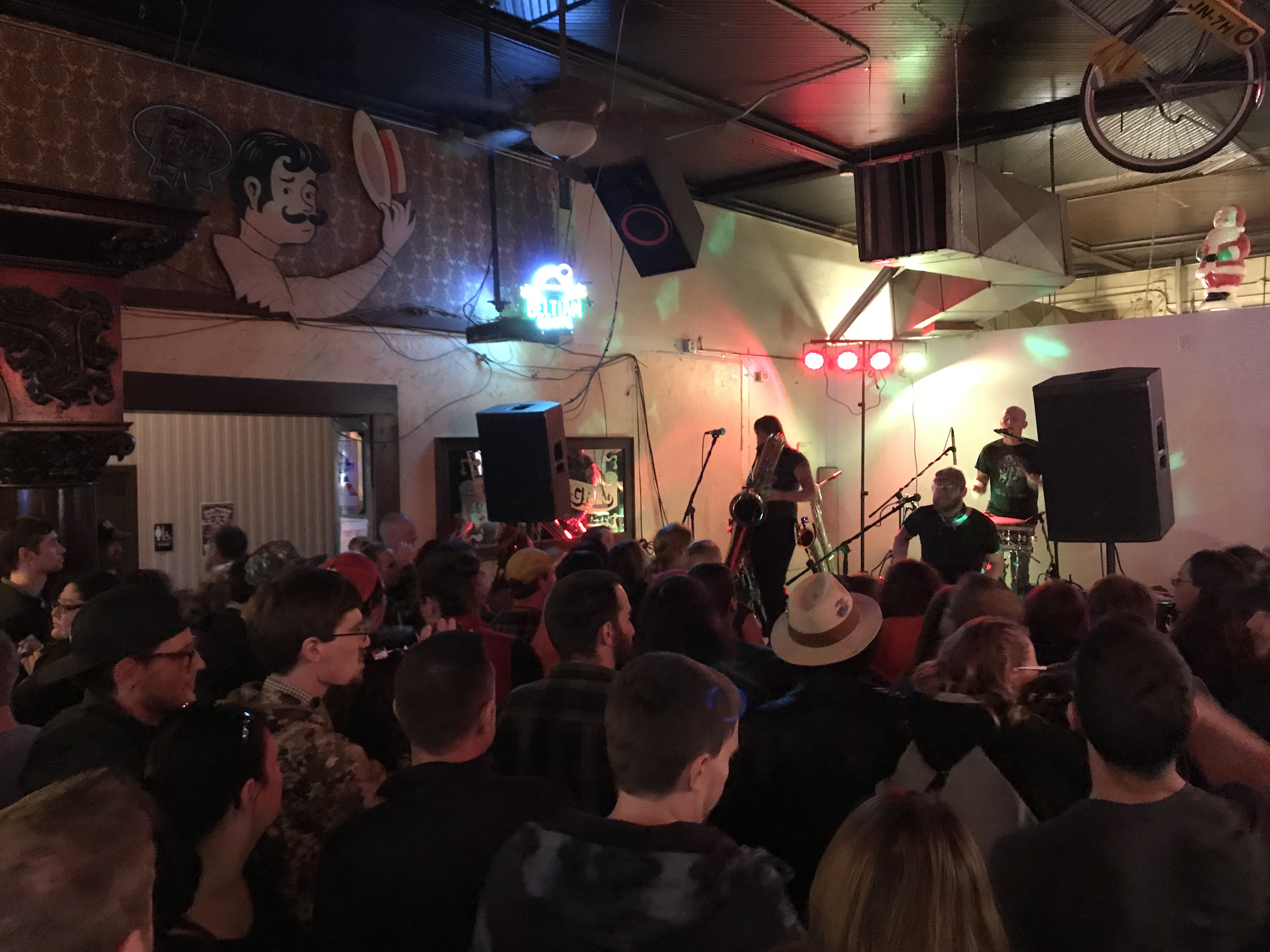
- The Hooten Hallers performing in Great Falls, Montana, in 2019

Background information
- Origin: Columbia, Missouri, U.S.
- Genres: Blues rock, Roots music
- Years active: 2007–present
- Label: Big Muddy Records
- Members: John Randall (Guitar, slide guitar, vocals, 2007-present); Andy Rehm (Drums, vocals, 2007-present); Kellie Everett (Baritone saxophone, bass saxophone, vocals, 2014-present)
- Past members: Paul Weber (Harmonica, tuba, 2013-2014)
- Website: http://www.thehootenhallers.com

The Hooten Hallers are an American blues and rock and roll band that formed in Columbia, Missouri, in 2007.

== History ==
The band was founded by guitarist/lead vocalist John Randall and drummer/falsetto vocalist Andy Rehm, who performed as a duo and were known for their raucous and often improvised live performances. Paul Weber briefly joined the band in 2013–14 on harmonica and tuba, and wrote several of the group's songs, such as "She Used to Love My Music" and "Trouble Is". Baritone and bass saxophonist Kellie Everett joined in 2014 and solidified the group's line-up as a trio. The Hooten Hallers are a "high-energy blues, soul and rock and roll band known for their gritty Americana roots music".

After a number of self-released albums, the Hooten Hallers signed with Big Muddy Records in 2012, releasing their album Greetings From Welp City!, which featured harmonica work by Ryan Koenig of Pokey LaFarge. The follow-up album Chillicothe Fireball, was released in 2014 on Big Muddy Records, and featured performances by Paul Weber and Kellie Everett. The group embarked on their first European tour in 2015 with Joe Buck and Viva Le Vox, performing in Belgium, Germany, The Netherlands, Sweden, Norway, Denmark, Switzerland, France, and Spain. The acoustic EP, "Mountain of Pain", was released on Big Muddy Records in 2016, and was an intentional departure from the band's sound, adding acoustic guitar, upright bass, fiddle, and piano to the mix.

The band's self-titled studio album, The Hooten Hallers, came out on April 21, 2017 on Big Muddy Records. Vice's Noisey called it "an exciting mix of blues, punk, and folk". The self-titled album was co-produced by Johnny Walker (Dr. John Wirick) of the Soledad Brothers and Kristo Baricevic. No Depression wrote that the music "evokes images of Tom Waits tending to a trotline at Lake of the Ozarks". The album charted at number 24 on The Roots Music Report's Top 50 Americana Country Album Chart for the week of May 27, 2017.

In December 2018, The Hooten Hallers released a live album, Live in Missouri, recorded at The Blue Note in Columbia, Missouri, on May 12, 2018.

On September 9, 2022, the band's next studio album, Back in Business Again was released, along with two accompanying music videos for "Back in Business Again" and "Cat Scrap". It was recorded in St Louis, Missouri, at the Native Sound Studios in December 2019 and produced by Dominic Davis. Aarik Danielsen of the Columbia Daily Tribune wrote, "The band's gleefully gritty sound never misses the mark, and their clear willingness to explore its every dimension ensures The Hooten Hallers' continued sway over anyone within earshot".

The band released their fifth commercially available studio album, 'The Devil's Egg', on Aug 9, 2024. Of this rock opera concept album, Aarik Danielsen wrote, "The story follows 'three disillusioned teenaged punks' who encounter the album's mysterious namesake object, then are whisked into an alien world". He further described the album: "Crafting this world in song, The Hooten Hallers only further amplify their union of the material and mystical and, chasing this story, craft one of their best and wildest albums yet".

== Tours ==
The band has toured or performed with acts such as The Dead South, Blues Traveler, Reverend Horton Heat, Pokey LaFarge, Legendary Shack Shakers, Possessed by Paul James, JD Wilkes & the Dirt Daubers, T Model Ford, The Reverend Peyton's Big Damn Band, Scott H. Biram, Split Lip Rayfield, Left Lane Cruiser, Black Diamond Heavies, Larry and His Flask, Unknown Hinson, and many others.

They have performed at a number of festivals in North America and Europe, including Winnipeg Folk Festival, Muddy Roots Music Festival, 80/35 Music Festival, the Roots N Blues Festival, SXSW, Rotterdam Bluegrass Festival, Festival International de Louisiane, Deep Blues Festival, Long Beach Folk Revival Festival, Wildwood Music Festival, Muddy Roots Europe, Mile of Music Festival, and Champaign-Urbana Folk and Roots Festival.

== Discography ==
Year	Title	Label
2007	We Have Friends	self-released
2009	The Epic Battle of Good and Evil	self-released
2009	Meld Minds	self-released
2010	Live At Widows Peak	self-released
2012	Live in Austin at the Legendary White Swan	self-released
2012	Greetings From Welp City!	Big Muddy Records
2012	War With Hell/ Missouri Boy b/w Holy Moses	Big Muddy Records
2014	Chillicothe Fireball	Big Muddy Records
2016	Mountain of Pain	Big Muddy Records
2017	The Hooten Hallers	Big Muddy Records
2018	Live in Missouri	Garlic Press
2022	Back In Business Again	Garlic Press
2024	The Devil's Egg	Garlic Press
2026	Van Jams Vol. 1	Garlic Press
