= Dylan Walshe =

Irish folk music singer-songwriter

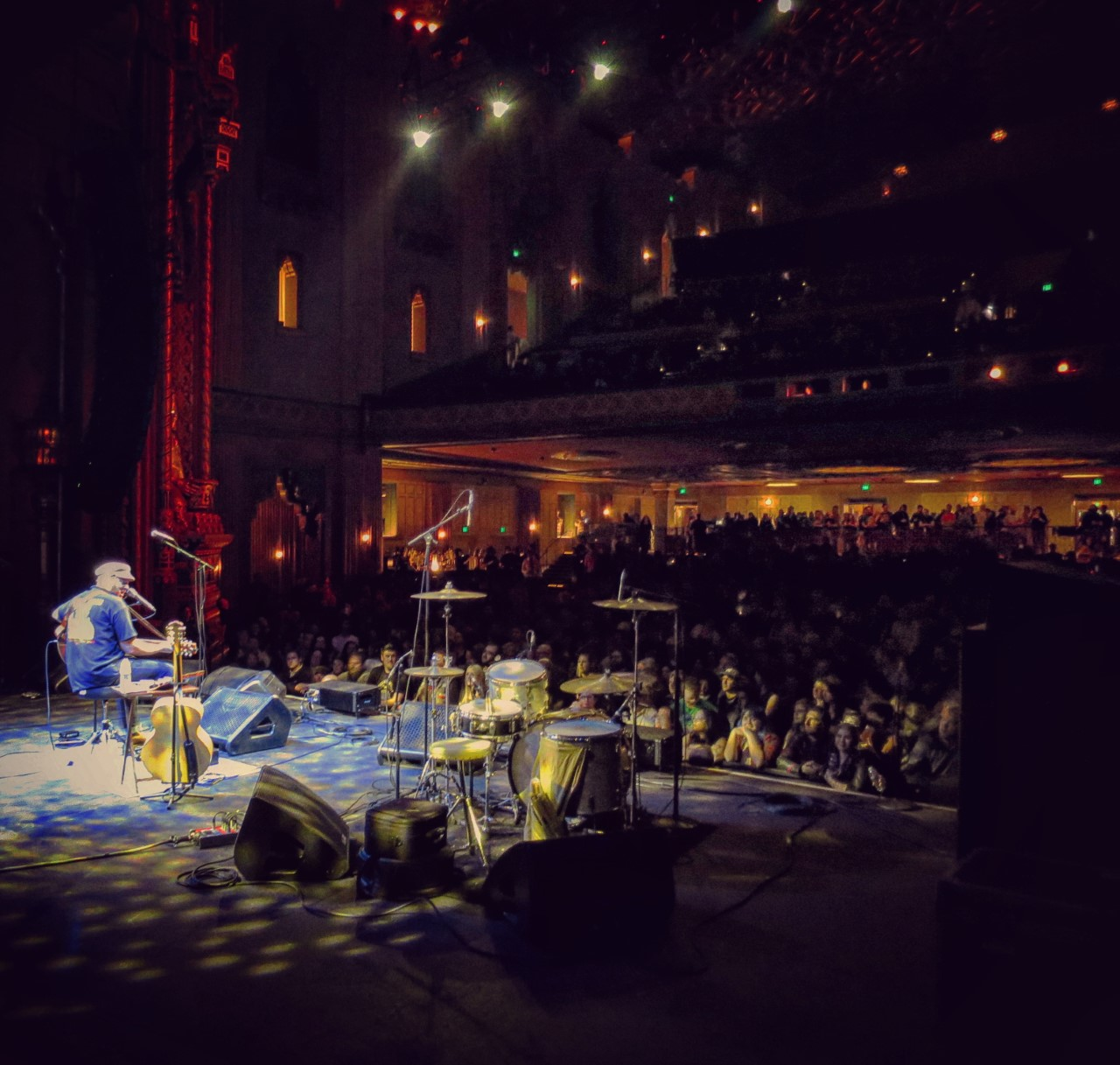
- Walshe at the Fox Theater, California, 2017

Background information
- Born: Dylan Robert Walshe
- Origin: Loughlinstown, Dublin
- Genres: Folk, Irish traditional, blues, roots music, one-man band
- Occupations: Musician, singer-songwriter
- Instruments: Guitar, harmonica, foot drum, singing
- Labels: Stirring Foot, Muddy Roots, Squoodge, Voodoo Rhythm
- Website: dylanwalshe.com

Dylan Robert Walshe (Irish: Dylan Breathnach) is an Irish folk music singer-songwriter. Born and raised in southeast Dublin, he is based in Black Mountain, North Carolina. He has toured with Flogging Molly, Avatar, The White Buffalo, The Mahones and recorded with James Fearnley of The Pogues.

== Career ==
Walshe first performed on stage at the age of 15 in a band which was formed with some school and neighbourhood friends. He played rhythm guitar and drums before moving onto performing as a solo singer-songwriter. After some years of performing at home in Ireland, Walshe lived out most of his 20s in London where he also spent some time in a band with R. Roswell of Spacemen 3. In 2013, Walshe released a limited edition 7" vinyl recording on the Berlin label Squoodge Records, R. Roswell recorded two of those tracks on some analog recording equipment in the living room of his London apartment. In 2015, Walshe released a live recording on Muddy Roots Records of Nashville, Tennessee.

Walshe moved to Nashville in 2016. After busking on lower Broadway, his first Nashville show was with Spider Stacy of The Pogues, the Lost Bayou Ramblers and The Secret Commonwealth on St. Patrick's Day at the Nashville Palace. In 2016, Walshe also released 'And Then You Cry' on The Monsters tribute album for Reverend Beat-Man's Swiss label Voodoo Rhythm Records. While in Nashville, Flogging Molly invited Walshe to perform on their 2017 Salty Dog Punk Rock cruise through The Bahamas. Subsequently, Flogging Molly then invited Walshe on a nationwide US and Canadian tour. The White Buffalo was also on that tour.

Walshe self-released his debut studio album of original songs All Manner of Ways in October 2018. The album reached No.1 on the Amazon Singer-Songwriters New Releases chart and No. 2 on the Amazon Singer-Songwriters Best Sellers chart. Songs from the album regularly feature on SiriusXM’s end of year top 100 lists. Paddy Rock (US) named All Manner of Ways its 2018 Roots Album of the Year. Shakenstir and The Alternate Root also named the album as one of the best of 2018. Irish folk singer Christy Moore nominated Walshe's work for the 2019 RTE Irish Folk Awards saying, "Dylan is a true Irish ballad singer, I admire his work." Paddy Rock (US) charted All Manner of Ways in the top 3 best Celtic Rock albums of the decade 2010–2019.

In 2018, Walshe opened for Billy Bob Thornton and The Boxmasters and recorded with James Fearnley of The Pogues. Walshe was the opener for the Swedish heavy metal group Avatar on a 32-date UK and European tour in 2019. Canadian celtic punk band The Mahones were also on that tour. Dylan often joined The Mahones onstage to perform with them.

From 2019 to 2020, Walshe produced and presented 16 episodes of the Irish radio show Your Kind of Folk on Garden County Radio from Greystones, County Wicklow, Ireland.

Since May 2021, Walshe has produced The Stirring Foot interview series. The Stirring Foot was launched on Dublin Digital Radio with Ramblin' Jack Elliott as Walshe's first guest. Other guests have included Steve Ignorant of Crass & John Sheahan of The Dubliners, Martin Carthy & Dónal Lunny.

As a solo performer, he has headlined tours throughout much of Europe and the US. He has appeared on bills with artists such as Del McCoury, Dr. Ralph Stanley, Ricky Skaggs, Peter Rowan, Ramblin' Jack Elliott, The Skatalites, DeVotchKa, NOFX, Jimmy "Duck" Holmes, Chris Bailey of The Saints, The Beat, Bonnie "Prince" Billy, The Blasters, Bobby Bare, Sheila Kay Adams, The Sonics, Tír na nÓg, Scullion, Willie Watson of Old Crow Medicine Show, Paul Simonon of The Clash, Malcolm Holcombe, the Melvins, Ray Wylie Hubbard, Derek Warfield of The Wolfe Tones, Don Letts, L. C. Ulmer, William Elliott Whitmore, Chuck Ragan, The Black Lillies, Joe Pug, Flatfoot 56, Young Dubliners, The Mekons, Jon Langford, David Childers and many more.

== Discography ==
- Blind Is Blind 7" Vinyl – Squoodge Records (2013)
- Muddy Folkin' Roots (Compilation/VA) CD & Digital – Muddy Roots (2014)
- Muddy Roots Record Artists (Compilation/VA) CD & Digital – Muddy Roots (2015)
- Soul Hell Cafe (Live) CD & Digital – Muddy Roots Records (2015)
- Blind Is Blind (Re-release) Digital only – Muddy Roots (2016)
- Eamonn Karan – Celtic Skies (contains 'Boy Buries Mother' written by Walshe) CD & digital – Real Music (2016)
- Tribute to the Monsters (Compilation/VA featuring 'And Then You Cry') Vinyl, CD & digital
- It's a Dark Holler! (Compilation/VA) CD – Mofo Music 2018
- All Manner of Ways (Album) Vinyl, CD & Digital – Stirring Foot Records (2018)
- It's a Dark Holler Vol 2 Blues, Roots & Hillfunk (Compilation/VA) CD – Mofo Music 2020
- Voodoo Rhythm Blues Trash Radio (Compilation/VA) Digital - Voodoo Rhythm Records
- Caverns Of Gold (Compilation/VA) Digital (2024) - Western North Carolina Hurricane Relief
- September’s Rain - A Live Recording (Single) Digital - Mustard Seed Records
