= Whiskey Dick =

Whiskey Dick may refer to:

== Places ==
- Whiskey Dick, Oregon, an unincorporated locale in Wasco County
- Whiskey Dick Mountain, in Washington state

== Other ==
- WhiskeyDick, a Texas country-metal duo
- Slang for alcohol-induced erectile dysfunction
