= Rusty Knuckles =

Rusty Knuckles Music
- Founded: 2008
- Founder: Ralph Miller
- Status: Active
- Genre: Metal; Alt-Country
- Country of origin: United States
- Location: Raleigh, North Carolina
- Official website: www.rustyknucklesmusic.com

Rusty Knuckles Music is a record label based in Raleigh, North Carolina, United States. The label was founded in 2008 by Ralph Miller, and is known for focusing on both digital and physical releases from bands in the Metal and Alt-Country genres. Its roster has included Hellbound Glory, Billy Don Burns, Antiseen, Reno Divorce, and WhiskeyDick. The label also specializes in leather-made accessories, including guitar straps and motorcycle bags.

== Artists ==
Current

- Antiseen
- Billy Don Burns
- Black Eyed Vermillion
- Buzzoven
- Carolina Still
- Datura
- Dripping Slits
- Flat Tires
- Hellbound Glory
- Husky Burnette
- Jay Berndt
- JB Beverley
- Kara Clark
- Motobunny
- Peewee Moore
- Reno Divorce
- Rory Kelly
- She Rides
- Stump Tail Dolly
- The Go Devils
- The Green Lady Killers
- WhiskeyDick

== See also ==
- List of record labels
