= Ryan Koenig =

American musician (born 1985)

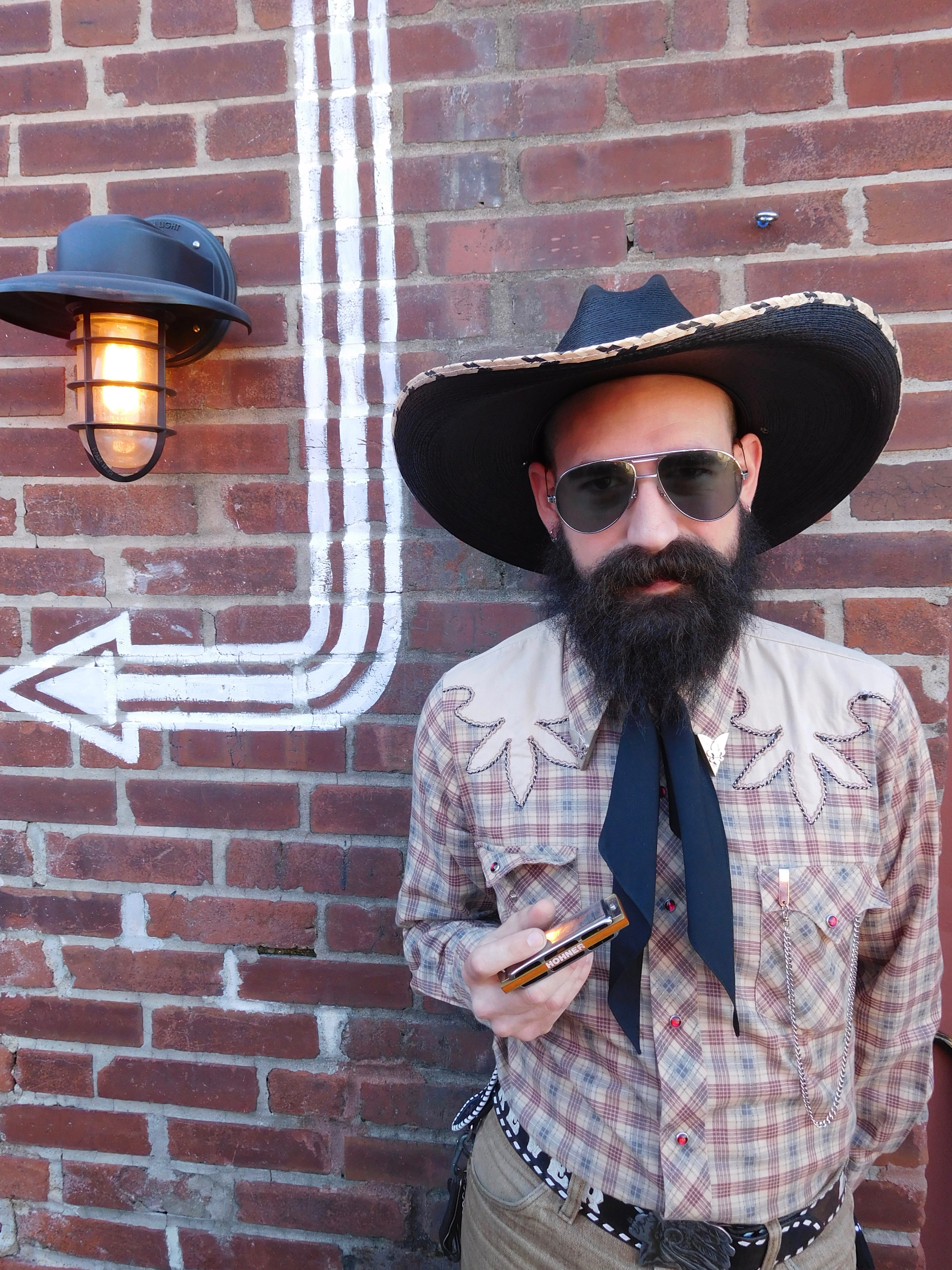
- Koenig in St Louis, 2018

Background information
- Born: Ryan McGrath Koenig; 4 October 1985 (age 40); St Louis, Missouri, United States
- Origin: St. Louis, Missouri, United States
- Genres: American roots
- Occupations: Musician, singer-songwriter
- Instruments: Vocals, harmonica, guitar, mandolin, banjo, fiddle, dobro
- Years active: 2004–present
- Website: www.ryankoenigstl.com

Ryan McGrath Koenig (born October 4, 1985, in St. Louis, Missouri, United States) is an American roots musician.

Koenig's early career began in 2004 as singer and guitarist for garage-rock band The Vultures. He later formed acoustic blues group The Rum Drum Ramblers with Mat Wilson and Joey Glynn. Koenig and Glynn joined up with Pokey LaFarge in 2008 and began touring extensively as Pokey LaFarge and the South City Three. The band, later shortened to Pokey LaFarge, toured the United States, Canada, Europe, Asia, Australia, and New Zealand, and made appearances on The Late Show with David Letterman, The Grand Ole Opry, The Marty Stuart Show, The Conan O'Brien Show, and in the motion picture The Lone Ranger, and many others.

Ryan Koenig's other current acts include duo with wife Kellie Everett, Southwest Watson Sweethearts, in addition to Rum Drum Ramblers, New Missouri Fox Hunters, Ryan Koenig and the Goldenrods, and appears as a guest with The Hooten Hallers, Jack Grelle, Lavender Country, and many others. His debut solo record Two Different Worlds was released by Big Muddy Records on October 13, 2017. On December 5, 2017, Koenig was seriously injured after being struck by a vehicle while walking during a tour stop in Charleston, South Carolina. Following the accident, Koenig ceased touring with the Pokey LaFarge band.

Koenig released a live solo recording entitled The Focal Point Recordings Vol 1 on December 29, 2018. He followed that release with Ryan Koenig and The Goldenrods, The Focal Point Recordings Vol 2, in December 2019.

== Appearances ==
- Pokey LaFarge and the South City Three appeared in an NPR Tiny Desk Concert series in 2011.
- Pokey and the members of the South City Three played on "I Guess I Should Go To Sleep", a track from Jack White's album Blunderbuss released on April 24, 2012.

== Discography ==
Release Date	Band	Title	Record Label
2005	The Vultures	The Vultures	Big Muddy Records
2006	Casey Reid	Cephalclog	Big Muddy Records
2006	The Vultures	Spirit of Saint Louis	Big Muddy Records
2007	The Vultures	Vultures and The Hooten Hallers Meld Minds	Big Muddy Records
2008	Rum Drum Ramblers	Hey Lordy Mama Mama Get Up and Go	Big Muddy Records
2009	Bob Reuter's Alley Ghost	Bob Reuter's Alley Ghost	Big Muddy Records
2009	The Hooten Hallers	The Epic Battle of Good and Evil	
2009	Rum Drum Ramblers	Trading Dollars for Dimes	Big Muddy Records
2010	Pokey LaFarge and the South City Three	Riverboat Soul	Free Dirt Records
2011	Pokey LaFarge and the South City Three	Middle of Everywhere	Free Dirt Records
2011	Pokey LaFarge and the South City Three	Chittlin’ Cookin’ Time in Cheatham County	Third Man Records
2011	Rum Drum Ramblers	Mean Scene	Big Muddy Records
2011	Bob Reuter's Alley Ghost	Born There	Big Muddy Records
2012	The Hooten Hallers	Greetings From Welp City	Big Muddy Records
2012	Pokey LaFarge and the South City Three	Fan It/ Shenandoah River	Evangelist Records
2012	Pokey LaFarge and the South City Three	Live in Holland	Continental Record Services
2012	Jack White	Blunderbuss	Third Man Records
2012	Jack White	Love Interruption/ Machine Gun Silhouette	Third Man Records
2012	Jack Grelle and the Johnson Family	Jack Grelle and the Johnson Family	Big Muddy Records
2013	Pokey LaFarge and The South City Three	The Lone Ranger (soundtrack) (Original Motion Picture Score)	Walt Disney Records
2013	Pokey LaFarge	Pokey LaFarge	Third Man Records
2013	Pokey LaFarge	Central Time/ St Louis Crawl	Third Man Records
2013	Lonesome Cowboy Ryan and His Dried Up Teardrops	Lonesome Cowboy Ryan and His Dried Up Teardrops	Big Muddy Records
2013	Lonesome Cowboy Ryan and His Dried Up Teardrops	Western Lanes	Big Muddy Records
2013	Rum Drum Ramblers	XO	Big Muddy Records
2014	Al Scorch's Moving Company	Vol. 1	
2014	Loot Rock Gang	That's Why I’ve Got To Sing	Big Muddy Records
2014	Jack Grelle	Steering Me Away	Big Muddy Records
2014	The Hobosexuals	Definitive Dirtbag: Volume 1	Big Muddy Records
2015	Pokey LaFarge	Something in the Water	Rounder Records
2015	Tortuga	West of Eden	Big Muddy Records
2016	Pokey LaFarge	Goodbye Barcelona/Blue Morning Lullaby	Rounder Records
2016	Al Scorch	Circle Round The Signs	Bloodshot Records
2016	Southwest Watson Sweethearts	Endless Horizon	Big Muddy Records
2016	Jack Grelle	Got Dressed Up To Be Let Down	Big Muddy Records
2016	Sidney Street Shakers	Laugh My Weary Blues Away	Big Muddy Records
2017	Various Artists	Music from The American Epic Sessions: Original Motion Picture Soundtrack	Lo-Max, Columbia, Third Man Records
2017	The Hooten Hallers	The Hooten Hallers	Big Muddy Records
2017	Pokey LaFarge	Manic Revelations	Rounder Records
2017	Ryan Koenig	Two Different Worlds	Big Muddy Records
2018	Nick Gusman	Dear Hard Times	
2018	Ryan Koenig	The Focal Point Recordings Vol. 1	
2019	Leann Fisher	Better Off Alone	
2019	The Opera Bell Band	Bell Slide	
2019	The Native Sons	Fringe	
2019	Ryan Koenig and The Goldenrods	The Focal Point Recordings Vol. 2	
2020	Jack Grelle	If Not Forever	
2020	Miss Jubilee and the Yas Yas Boys	Cool It If You Can	Bigtone Records
2022	The Sapsuckers	I'll Know It When I See It	
2023	So Grand Polka Band	Party Potato	
2023	Glory 'N Perfection	Country Music	
2024	The Goldenrods	Cry Time	
2025	Skylar Townsend	Hit The Ground Runnin'	

== Honors, distinctions, and awards ==
- 2011 Independent Music Awards: Riverboat Soul – Best Americana Album
- 2012 Independent Music Awards: Middle of Everywhere – Best Americana Album
- 2015 Something in the Water was named one of Peter Jones’ Best Folk Albums of 2015 in the Folk Department of WTJU, University of Virginia radio station.
- 2018 Named as an honoree of The Riverfront Times' STL 77
