= 7 Shot Screamers =

American psychobilly band

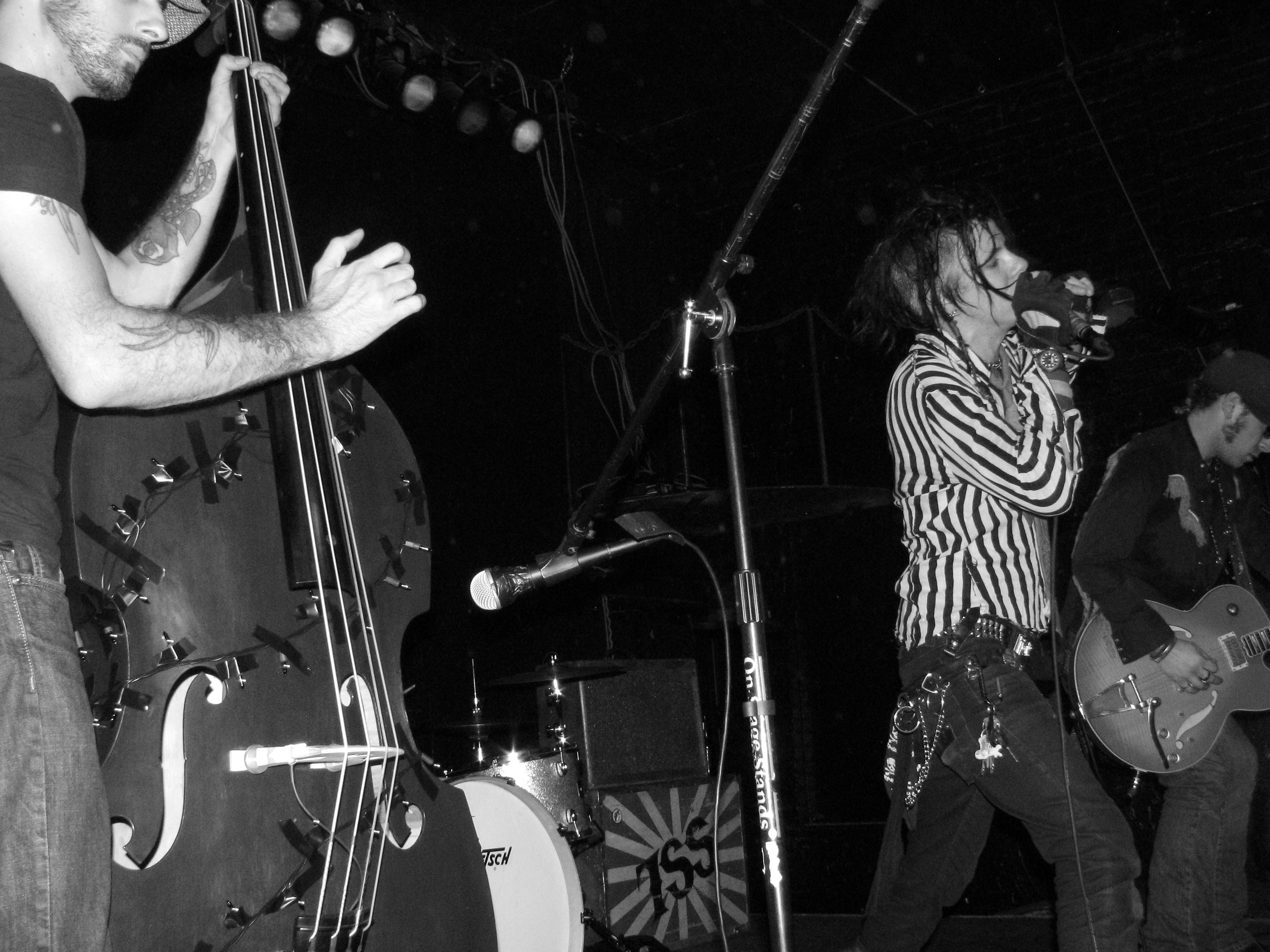
- 7 Shot Screamers (pictured: Planktin, Leahy, Sabella) in 2009

Background information
- Origin: St. Louis, Missouri, United States
- Genres: Psychobilly, rockabilly
- Years active: 1998–present
- Label: Big Muddy Records
- Members: Mike Leahy, Kevin O'Connor (drummer), Dan Sabella, Chris Powers Jr.
- Past members: Sarkes Roubanian
- Website: www.7shotscreamers.com

7 Shot Screamers is an American psychobilly band from St. Louis, Missouri in the United States.

== History ==
The band is originally from Fenton, Missouri. Singer Mike Leahy met bassist Chris Powers while in school at Parkway South High School. The two played a few punk bands and eventually moved towards rockabilly. They went to a jazz concert and ended up meeting Kevin O'Connor, who became the drummer. The band was officially formed in 1998. While in high school, their singles were played on KDHX. The radio show host Al Swacker spread the word about the band, which helped them get one of their first shows at the Way Out Club in St. Louis.

Their first 7" inch sold over 1,500 copies. In 1999, their LP I Was a Teenage 7 Shot Screamer sold over 2,000 copies. Both the single and album were released by the band. The LP was eventually reissued by Hepcat Records. Dan Sabella joined the band as guitarist in 2003. In 2006, the band was named the top Garage/Rockabilly band in St. Louis by the Riverfront Times. The band's 2006 album, In Wonderland, features their first recorded song in Spanish.

They have toured with The Quakes. In 2011, the band went on a brief hiatus while Leahy tried out for America's Got Talent with his Clownvis Presley act.

== Side projects and collaborations ==
The 7 Shot Screamers, sans singer Leahy, serve as the back up band for Exene Cervenka, with whom they tour with as the Original Sinners. The original Original Sinners began performing in 2002 with Cervenka. Different musicians made up the band's line-up. Cervenka decided to hire a band, rather than keep a rotating list of musicians who performed when available. In 2000, Cervenka saw the 7 Shot Screamers perform in St. Louis. In early 2005, Cervenka asked the band to take over the role as the Original Sinners. They are the seventh, and longest standing, incarnation of the Original Sinners. While touring with Cervenka, the 7 Shot Screamers, with Leahy, would open the shows and then Leahy would sell merchandise while the rest of the band performed with Cervenka.

Leahy has his own side project, Clownvis Presley. Leahy dresses up like Elvis Presley with a clown suit and make up. He performs vaudeville style singing, magic and dancing, often with burlesque and other variety performers.

== Music style and influences ==
They are often described as glam rock meets rockabilly. The Riverfront Times describes the band as an "uncouth and original blend of the Clash, the Stray Cats, and the Pogues." Weekly Alibi described the band as Mike Ness, minus Social Distortion, with "psychedelic elements" of the Clash. Their single "Hooker" "sounds almost like a demented Big Bopper cover of "Johnny B. Goode"". Punk's reviewers described the 7 Shot Screamers in Wonderland as the Stray Cats meets Richard Hell.

Lead singer Mike Leahy cites Morrissey as an influence. His vocals with the 7 Shot Screamers have been compared to Morrissey's, "if Morrissey yelled more and refused to stand still on stage." As a child, Leahy was inspired by Axl Rose and Michael Jackson as performers. As he grew up, he found inspiration in the performance style of Iggy Pop.

== Members ==
- Mike Leahy – singer
- Chris Powers Jr. – bass
- Kevin O'Connor – drums
- Dan Sabella – guitar

== Discography ==
=== Studio albums ===
- I Was A Teenage 7 Shot Screamer (June 12, 2001) (7 Shot Records)
- Keep The Flame Alive (September 7, 2004) (Haunted Town Records)
- 7 Shot Screamers In Wonderland (August 18, 2006) (Big Muddy Records)

=== Compilations ===
- "Friday Night Rumble, Vol.6" (Run Wild Records)
- "Rocked and Loaded, Vol. 2" (Rock-n-Roll Purgatory Records)

=== As The Original Sinners ===
- "Sev7en" (March 7, 2006) (Nitro Records)

== See also ==
- List of psychobilly bands
