= Hipbone Slim =

British musician

Mark Painter, stage-name Hipbone Slim and previously Sir Bald Diddley, is a British garage rock and roll musician, songwriter, and multi-instrumentalist. He has released many albums since the 1990s.

== History ==
In March 1996, he performed as Sir Bald Diddley & His Wigouts, at the 4th annual Pipeline Instrumental Rock Convention that took place at International Students House, London. The last song of the set was "Misirlou".

As Sir Bald Diddley and the Wigouts, their version of the instrumental tune "Jack the Ripper" appeared in the 1997 film Robinson In Space, the original version was by Link Wray.

In April 2010, he performed as Sir Bald Diddley and Hipbone Slim in Sweden.

In June 2011, as Hipbone Slim & the Kneetremblers, he released the album, Louisiana Sun in collaboration with Mama Rosin.

In July 2012, as Hipbone Slim & the Kneetremblers, he performed at Sjock Festival in Belgium.

In April 2016, as Hipbone Slim & the Kneetremblers, Sir Bald Diddley performed at a punk festival in Leighton Buzzard.

On March 28, 2019, Hipbone Slim performed a supporting set before headliner Lewis Floyd Henry at the The Blues Kitchen in Camden Town in London as part of the One Man Band Festival.

In January 2023, as Hipbone Slim and the Kneejerks, he released the albums You've Been Rumbled and Gone To the Dogs.

In July 2023, Sir Bald Diddley performed at KFJC's International Surf Classic at the Art Boutiki in San Jose, California. The same month he also performed at the Surf Guitar 101 Festival in Long Beach, California.

In September 2025, as Sir Bald Diddley, he fronted the band The Nine Ton Peanut Smugglers at a show in Oxford, after his music had appeared in the TV show, Stranger Things. His song, "Legless", appeared in season 4, episode 404.

== Discography ==
=== Albums ===
- Two Man Beer Stomp (as Baldie McGhee and Juke Boy Barkus, 1991, Snake Snake Records)
- Surfin' With Sir Bald Diddley And His Right Honourable Big Wigs (1992, Alopecia Records)
- What's In Your Fridge? (as Sir Bald Diddley And His Right Honourable Big Wigs, 1994, Alopecia Records)
- Get Ahead Get A Fez (as Sir Bald Diddley And His Right Honourable Big Wigs, 1995, Alopecia Records)
- Scorchin' The Blues Vol. 1 (as Baldie McGhee, 1995, various artists, Alopecia Records)
- A Narrow Escape (as Sir Bald Diddley, 1995, Alopecia Records)
- Nitrous Peroxide (as Sir Bald Diddley & His Wig Outs, 1996, Alopecia Records)
- Pie-Go-Mania (as Sir Bald Diddley & His Wig Outs, 1996, Alopecia Records)
- Shake It In The Dark (as Baldie McGhee, 1997, various artists, Alopecia Records)
- To Baldly Go... (as Sir Bald Diddley & His Wig Outs, 2000, Sympathy for the Record Industry)
- Sir Bald Diddley And His Wig Outs Go Japan With Enocky Cedric, Tomoko Snazz and The 5678s (2000, Alopecia Records)
- The Man With Two Left Hands (as Sir Bald Diddley & His Wig Outs, 2001, Corduroy Records)
- Drive Like An Italian (as Sir Bald Diddley & His Wig Outs, 2003, Alopecia Records)
- Snake Pit (as Hipbone Slim And The Knee-Tremblers, 2003, Voodoo Rhythm)
- The Snags (as The Snags, 2003, Alopecia Records)
- Have Knees Will Tremble (as Hipbone Slim And The Knee-Tremblers, 2004, Voodoo Rhythm)
- Garage Punk (as The Snags, 2005, De Wolfe Music)
- The Sheik Said Snake (as Hipbone Slim And The Knee-Tremblers, 2008, Voodoo Rhythm)
- The Electrifying Sounds Of... (as The Kneejerk Reactions, 2008)
- Drop Some Leg!, (as Nine Ton Peanut Smugglers, 2009)
- The Kneeanderthal Sounds of Hipbone Slim And The Knee Tremblers (2010, Voodoo Rhythm)
- Sir Bald's Hairy Guitar (as Hipbone Slim & The Kneetremblers, 2010, Beast Records)
- Square Guitar (as Hipbone Slim And The Kneetremblers, 2011, Beast Records)
- Louisiana Sun (as Hipbone Slim And The Kneetremblers with Mama Rosin, 2011, Voodoo Rhythm)
- Hipbone Slim & The Kneetremblers (2011, De Wolfe Music)
- Go Hog Wild! (as Hipbone Slim And The Kneetremblers, 2012, Folc Records)
- Hipbone Slim vs Sir Bald (as Hipbone Slim, 2012, Dirty Water Records)
- Ska Generation (as The Nine Ton Peanut Smugglers, 2012, De Wolfe Music)
- Ugly Mobile (as Hipbone Slim & The Kneetremblers, 2013, Beast Records)
- Sir Bald's Battle of The Bands (various artists, 2013, Beast Records)
- Out Of This World Sounds Of Hipbone Slim And The Kneetremblers (2014)
- The Indestructible Sounds Of... (as The Kneejerk Reactions, 2014, Dirty Water Records)
- The Hair Raising Sounds Of... (as Hipbone Slim And The Crown Toppers, 2015, Beast Records)
- Bo Gumbo (as Hipbone Slim, various artists, 2016, Folc Records)
- The Mings (as Bald Ming, 2018, Trash Wax)
- Tremblin' The Blues (as Hipbone Slim And The Knee Tremblers, 2017, Beast Records)
- Flip Your Wig! (as Sir Bald Diddley And His Ripcurls, 2017, Soundflat Records)
- Ain't Got A Leg To Stand On (as Hipbone Slim & The Kneetremblers, 2018, Beast Records)
- Gonna Have My Cake And Eat It! (as Hipbone Slim One Man Band, 2019, Monster Mash Records)
- The Toppermost Sounds Of... (as Hipbone Slim And The Crown Toppers, 2019, Folc Records)
- Can't Win (as Bald Ming, The Mings, 2020, Soundflat Records)
- Tremblin' (as Hipbone Slim And The Kneetremblers, 2021, Dirty Water Records)
- You've Been Rumbled (as Hipbone Slim And The Kneejerks, 2022, Crowntopper Records)
- Gone To The Dogs (as Hipbone Slim And The Kneejerks, 2022, Crowntopper Records)
- Gone To The Dogs Plus You've Been Rumbled (as Hipbone Slim And The Kneejerks, 2022, Crowntopper Records)
- Wiggin' Out (as Hipbone Slim, 2023, Double Crown Records)
- Escaped From The Zoo (as Sir Bald Y Los Hairies, 2023)
- The Hairy Scary Sounds Of... (as Hipbone Slim and Sir Bald Diddley, 2024, Ghost Highway Recordings)
- Pieces Of Eight (as Nine Ton Peanut Smugglers, 2025, Liquidator Music)
- Get a Move On (as Hipbone Slim & The Kneejerks, 2025, Soundflat Records)
