= The Delta Bombers =

American rock band

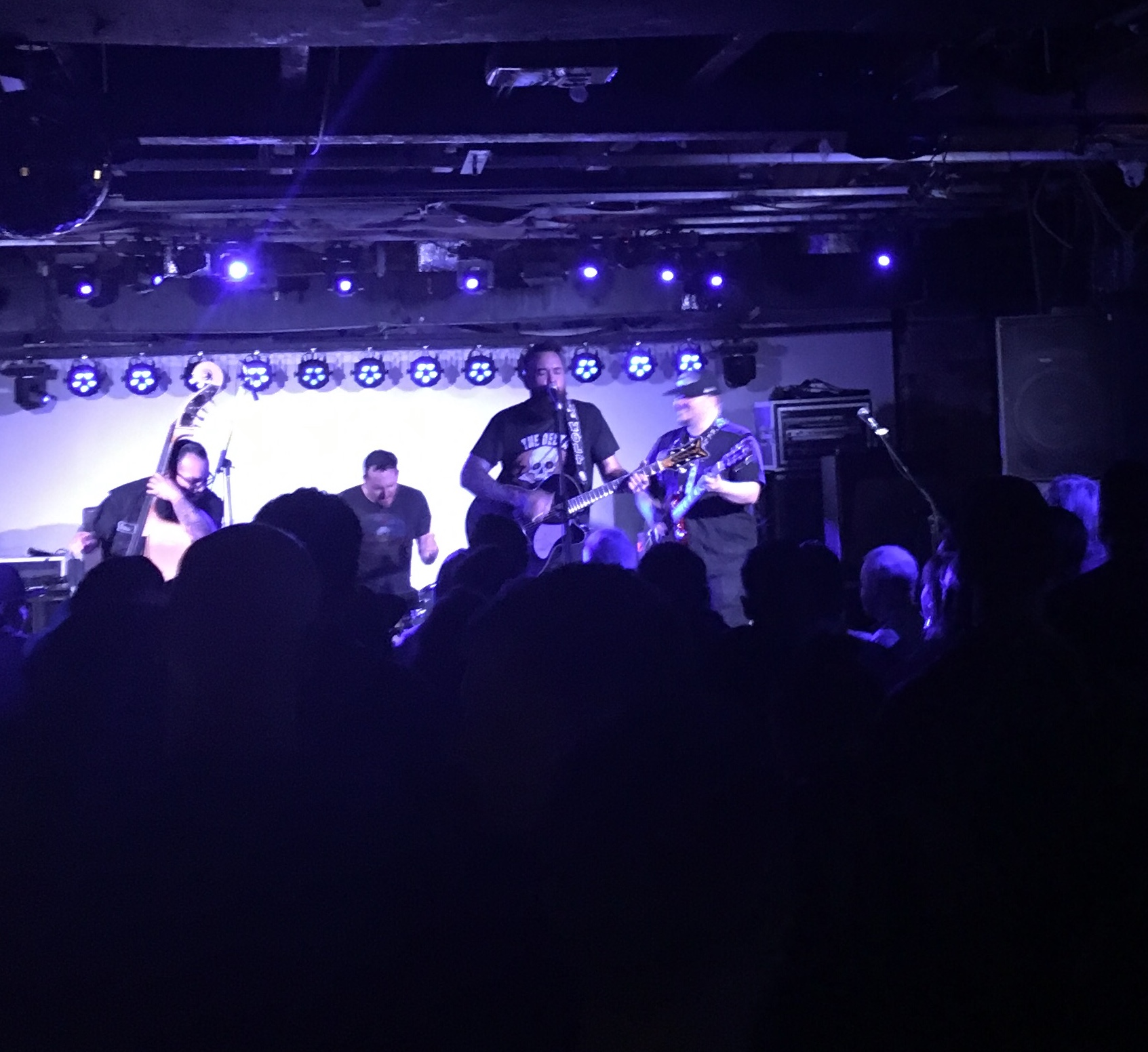
- The Delta Bombers at Dickens in Calgary, Alberta in 2019

Background information
- Origin: Las Vegas, Nevada
- Genres: Rock and roll; blues; rockabilly; country
- Years active: 2008–present
- Labels: Wild Records
- Members: Pip Hancox; Andrew Himmler; Gregorio Garcia; PJ Franco
- Past members: Chris Moinichen; Nicholas Lopez Oscar Chong Jesse Alonso; Kirk Highberger Micah Malcolm
- Website: thedeltabombers.com

The Delta Bombers are an American rock band that formed in Las Vegas, Nevada in 2008.

== History ==
Andrew Himmler and Chris Moinichen formed The Delta Bombers in 2008 after meeting on Myspace following Andrew's post about starting a rockabilly band in Las Vegas. They filled in the original line-up with Nicholas Lopez on drums and Oscar Chong on stand up bass.

The Delta Bombers recorded their first album "Howlin’" at Wild Records USA in Nov 2008, and it was released March 2009.

They started playing shows in Los Angeles and Las Vegas and were noticed by European promoters who began booking them European shows. Their first European show was Rockin’ At The Drive-In Barn No. 6 in Oosteeklo, Belgium on August 20, 2011.

Their follow-up album "Wolf" was recorded in 2011 at Wild Records USA and released in 2012. Wolf gained attention from the global rockabilly community as the group embarked on their first extended headlining tour in Europe, which included the United Kingdom, Ireland, Germany, Austria, Belgium, The Netherlands, Denmark, and Sweden.

Further lineup changes occurred in 2012 when Gregorio Garcia joined on upright bass and Jesse Alonzo joined on drums.

The Delta Bombers’ third album, the self-titled release The Delta Bombers, was recorded in 2014 and received accolades including a 5 star review from Germany's Dynamite Magazine.

In 2015, having previously had little traction in the US aside from southern California and their home base of Las Vegas, The Delta Bombers were invited to open for former The Descendents member Doug Carrion’s band The Black Listed on a nationwide tour. A line-up change found drummer Kirk Highberger replacing Jesse Alonzo.

Their fourth studio album Pressure and Time was released in Jan 2018 on Wild Records, and crossed over into the roots music/ Americana scenes.

Drummer Micah Malcolm joined in 2018, and was replaced in Jan 2020 with drummer PJ Franco.

Frontman Chris Moinichen departed in March 2024, and was replaced on vocals by Pip Hancox of the Guana Batz.

== Special appearances ==
In 2013, The Delta Bombers were featured alongside other Wild Records artists in the documentary called "Los Wild Ones" by director Elise Salomon.

In 2015, the song "Run and Hide" from the album Howlin’ appeared in season 2 of the Netflix series From Dusk till Dawn: The Series.

In 2022, the song “The Wolf” appeared in 2K Games launch trailer for “The Quarry” video game. The song was also used as the opening title track of the Channel 4 police TV show "Night Coppers".

== Discography ==
Year	Title	Label
2009	Howlin	Wild Records
2009	"Witch Doctor" b/w "Let's Go"	Wild Records
2012	Wolf	Wild Records
2014	The Delta Bombers	Wild Records
2015	The Delta Bombers LIVE	Wild Records
2017	"The Wolf" b/w "Good Disguise"	Wild Records
2018	Pressure and Time	Wild Records
2019	"15 to Life" b/w "Wild and Free"	Self Released
2019	"Give 'em All" b/w "Lovin' Hell"	Self Released
2020	"Bottom of the Pack" b/w "This is The Night"	Self Released
2020	"Save Me" b/w ".44"	Self Released
2023	Neon Sounds	Self Released
