= Big Muddy Records =

American record label

- Founded: 2005
- Founder: Chris Baricevic
- Distributors: Entertainment One, Amped
- Genre: Proto-punk, punk rock, garage rock, folk, country, honky tonk, jazz, blues
- Country of origin: U.S.
- Location: St Louis, Missouri
- Official website: bigmuddyrecords.com

Big Muddy Records is an independent American roots music record label based out of St Louis, Missouri. Founded by Chris (Kristo) Baricevic in 2005, Big Muddy Records has been a pivotal element in the development of many of St Louis' roots music acts, ranging from garage rock, punk, country, traditional jazz, blues, and folk music. Big Muddy Records is distributed by Entertainment One and Amped.

Big Muddy Records artists include The Hooten Hallers, Jack Grelle, Ryan Koenig, Maximum Effort, Sidney Street Shakers, Rum Drum Ramblers, The Strange Places, The Loot Rock Gang, The Hobosexuals, Tortuga, and Southwest Watson Sweethearts.

Past Big Muddy recording artists include Pokey LaFarge, Bob Reuter of The Dinosaurs and Alley Ghost, and 7 Shot Screamers.

== Bob Reuter and his legacy ==
After the death of Bob Reuter in 2013, Chris Baricevic and Big Muddy Records became executors of Reuter's estate, including his catalog of music and his photography. They were tasked with preserving his legacy and forming the Cowboy Angel Foundation. Big Muddy Records is working to re-issue Reuter's back catalog.

== Awards ==
Big Muddy Records was awarded the Best Local Record Label in 2008 and 2009 by The Riverfront Times.

== Discography ==
Release Date	Catalog Number	Band	Title
2005	BMR001	The Vultures	The Vultures
2005	BMR002	Johnny O and The Jerks	Takin' out the Trashabilly
2006	BMR003	Casey Reid	Cephalclog
2006	BMR004	7 Shot Screamers	In Wonderland
2007	BMR005	The Monads	Ornery
2007	BMR006	Johnny O and The Jerks/ The Vultures	Spirit of St Louis
2008	BMR007	Rum Drum Ramblers	Hey Lordy Mama Mama Get up and Go
2008	BMR008	Pokey LaFarge	Beat, Move, and Shake
2009	BMR009	Rum Drum Ramblers	Trading Dollars for Dimes
2010	BMR010	Bob Reuter's Alley Ghost	Bob Reuter's Alley Ghost
2011	BMR011	Rum Drum Ramblers	Mean Scene
2012	BMR012	The Hooten Hallers	Greetings from Welp City!
2012	BMR013	Bob Reuter's Alley Ghost	Born There
2012	BMR014	The Hooten Hallers	"War with Hell/ Missouri Boy b/w Holy Moses
2012	BMR015	Jack Grelle and The Johnson Family	Jack Grelle and The Johnson Family
2012	BMR016	Jack Grelle and The Johnson Family	"Simple Needs b\w One Track Mind"
2013	BMR017	"Lonesome Cowboy" Ryan Koenig	"Western Lanes b\w I'm from Missouri"
2013	BMR018	"Lonesome Cowboy" Ryan Koenig	Lonesome Cowboy Ryan and His Dried Up Teardrops
2013	BMR019	The Hobosexuals	Whiskey Maker b\w She's Got a New Life (I've Got a High Life)
2013	BMR020	Bob Reuter's Alley Ghost	Dana Dew
2014	BMR021	Rum Drum Ramblers	X/O 45- Kickstart b/w Sure Sign
2014	BMR022	The Hooten Hallers	Chillicothe Fireball
2014	BMR023	The Hobosexuals	Definitive Dirtbag: Volume 1
2014	BMR024	Jack Grelle	Steering Me Away
2014	BMR025	Loot Rock Gang	That's Why I've Got to Sing
2015	BMR026	Tortuga	West of Eden
2016	BMR027	Southwest Watson Sweethearts	Endless Horizon
2016	BMR028	Kristo	Happy Camp
2016	BMR029	Sidney Street Shakers	Laugh My Weary Blues Away
2016	BMR030	Jack Grelle	Got Dressed Up to Be Let Down
2016	BMR031	The Hooten Hallers	Mountain of Pain
2017	BMR032	Maximum Effort	Money, Lies, & Media Reels
2017	BMR033	The Hooten Hallers	The Hooten Hallers
2017	BMR034	The Dinosaurs	The Dinosaurs
2017	BMR035	Ryan Koenig	Two Different Worlds
2017	BMR036	Jenny Roques	Burnin' Moonlight
2017	BMR037	Jo Morris	Ghost Queen
2018	BMR038	Tortuga	Songs About Mountains
