= Wild Records =

Wild Records was a record label based in Los Angeles, California(business side) . Started by Reb Kennedy, the label specializes in Rockabilly, Rock and Roll, Blues, Soul, and other roots music.

== History ==
Wild Records was formed in 2001. The first band that was signed to the label was Lil Luis y Los Wild Teens, who recorded a Mexican rock and roll song called La Rebeldona. Since that first 45 R.P.M. release, Wild Records has worked to sign, promote, book, and record artists. They have been widely celebrated for their artists' unique ability to make contemporary music while still remaining authentic and true to the original styles that have inspired them. Acts on the label regularly headline worldwide rockabilly and rock n' roll festivals such as The Rockabilly Rave, High Rockabilly, Viva Las Vegas, Sjock Festival and Let's Get Wild. Wild Records and founder Reb Kennedy is the subject of an independent film release entitled Los Wild Ones in 2013. The film has toured the international film circuit to generally positive praise. The film is noteworthy in that it concentrates on not just music, but the personal relationships of the musicians inside

== Wild Records Europe ==
On September 1, 2015, the label announced the start of a European division Wild Records Europe.

== Roster ==
- Alex Vargas
- Barny and the Rhythm Allstars
- Bebo and the Goodtime Boys
- Bibi and Her Tremblin' Souls
- Black Mambas
- Bobby Wilson
- Carl and the Rhythm Allstars
- Carlos and the Bandidos
- Carlos Mejuto
- Chuy and the Bobcats
- Craig Shaw and the Illuminators
- Darrel Higham
- Dasta and the Smokin' Snakes
- Deadly Spirits
- Dusty Chance and the Allnighters
- Eddie and thee Scorpions
- Eddie Clendening
- Elvis Cantu
- Furious
- Gizzelle
- Isaac Webb Trio
- Israel Proulx
- Jake Allen
- Jeff Beware and the Bop Thrills
- Jerry Cochran and the Salt Flat Trio
- Jimmy Dale and the Beltline
- Jittery Jack
- Josh Hi-Fi and the Rhythm Kings
- Lew Philips
- Lightnin' Jay & Hammer Rob
- Lil Luis Y Los Wild Teens
- Lil Sal and the Wildtones
- Little Victor
- Los Blancos
- Los Killertones
- Luis and the Wildfires
- |Mary Simich
- Omar and the Stringpoppers
- Omar Romero
- Pachuco Jose
- Pat Capocci
- Pat James
- Paul O and the Rough Diamonds
- Rockin' Rick and the Rhythm Wranglers
- Roy Dee and the Spitfires
- Rusty and the Dragstrip Trio
- Santos
- Savage Breed
- Sean Coleman and the Quasars
- Shanda and the Howlers
- Smokehouse Dave
- Sonny West
- Texas Steve
- The Attention
- The Bad Situations
- The Barbwires
- The Blue Rhythm Boys
- The Boss Tides
- The Caezars
- The Desperados
- The Devil Winds
- The Downbeats
- The Dragtones
- The Greasemarks
- The Hexxers
- The Hi-Boys
- The Hi-Jivers
- The Hi-Strung Ramblers
- The Hi-Tone Boppers
- The Hi-Tones
- The Hurricanes
- The Montesas
- The Neumans
- The Nightimes
- The Red Hot Rockets
- The Rhythm Shakers
- The Rhythm Torpedoes
- The Sparks Boys
- The Stompin' Riffraffs
- The Straynge
- The Terrorsaurs
- The Vargas Brothers
- The Wild Goners
- Tiny and Mary
- TJ Mayes
- Trio Renacimiento
- Will and the Hi-Rollers
