= L. C. Ulmer =

American songwriter (1928–2016)

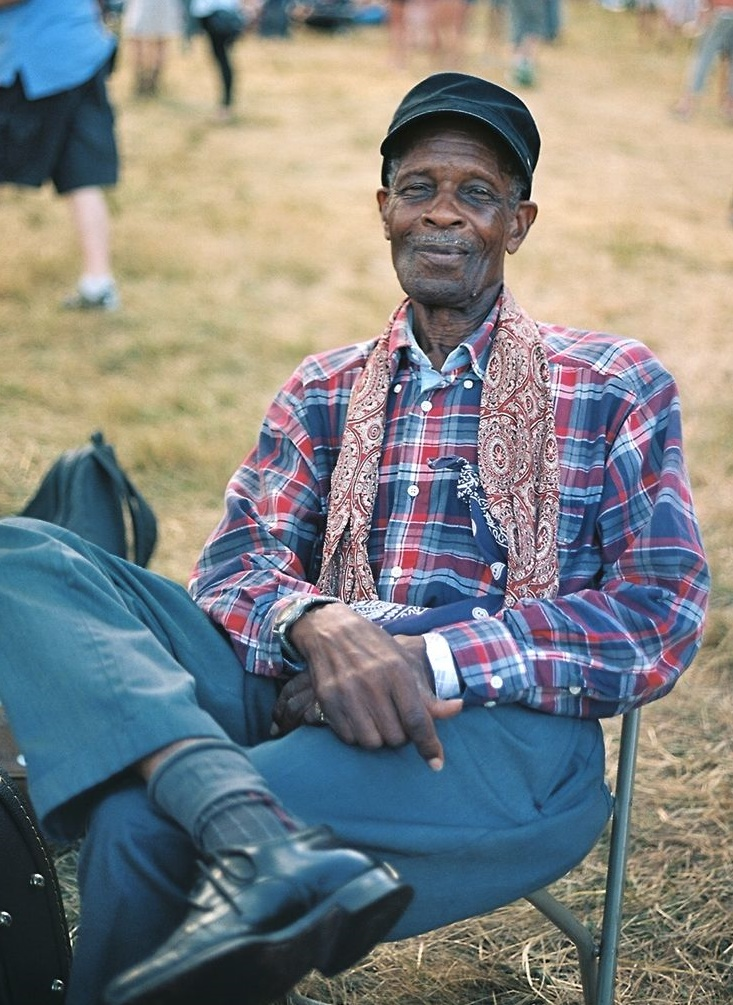
- Ulmer in 2011

Background information
- Born: Lee Chester Ulmer; August 28, 1928; Stringer, Mississippi, U.S.
- Died: February 14, 2016 (aged 87) Ellisville, Mississippi, U.S.
- Genres: Delta blues
- Occupations: Singer, songwriter, one-man band
- Instruments: Guitar, banjo, mandolin, fiddle, vocals, keyboards, drums, kazoo, harmonica
- Years active: Early 1940s–2016

Lee Chester "L. C." Ulmer (August 28, 1928 – February 14, 2016) was an American delta blues musician. He was a regular performer for over half a century, playing at festivals and clubs throughout the United States and elsewhere, but particularly in the Deep South. Ulmer was featured in the 2008 documentary film M for Mississippi: A Road Trip Through the Birthplace of the Blues. His earliest musical influence was Blind Roosevelt Graves. Ulmer later met numerous notable musicians, including Elvis Presley, Les Paul and Mary Ford, Brook Benton, Nat King Cole, Fats Domino, Louis Armstrong, Muddy Waters, Elmore James, Howlin' Wolf, and Buddy Guy, and performed with some of them.

Ulmer was a multi-instrumentalist and often performed in his younger days as a one-man band.

== Biography ==
Ulmer was born in Stringer, Jasper County, Mississippi. He was the youngest of fourteen children of Luther Ulmer and Mattie Brown. The family moved to a plantation near Moss Hill, where the whole family played music. The country singer Jimmie Rodgers was a notable visitor, who played alongside the family while drinking whiskey from the still of the plantation owner's son. Ulmer had learned to play the guitar by the age of nine and listened to records by Blind Lemon Jefferson, Blind Boy Fuller, Tampa Red, and Peetie Wheatstraw. His main influence for slide guitar technique was Blind Roosevelt Graves, whom Ulmer saw perform on the streets of Laurel, Mississippi. After starting to play on the streets himself, Ulmer found regular employment in his teenage years, building wooden trestles to support a railway line across Lake Pontchartrain. He was later employed near Heidelberg, Mississippi, working on the construction of railway lines to nearby oil wells.

In 1949, Ulmer traveled to Kansas City, Kansas, to visit his sister, and his guitar-playing experiences included backing J. B. Lenoir at a local venue. Ulmer was later based in Laurel and developed his one-man-band show at various clubs there and in Meridian, Mississippi. He continued to travel and, in 1955, found work at the Motoaurant on Route 66 in Holbrook, Arizona, and played in its nightclub, the Cock 'n' Bull. It was there that he met Elvis Presley, Les Paul and Mary Ford, Brook Benton, Nat King Cole, Fats Domino, and Louis Armstrong. In his further travels, Ulmer joined the musicians union in Hollywood, California, performed in most major states, and returned home to visit his parents. In the early 1960s, he moved back to Laurel, where he joined the Bel Air Clowns, playing at local clubs.

Ulmer eventually moved again, to Joliet, Illinois, his home for the next 37 years. There he worked in construction and at his own automotive shop and also often performed as a one-man band and worked as a club host. It was here that Ulmer met and worked with Muddy Waters, Elmore James, Howlin' Wolf, Buddy Guy, Hound Dog Taylor, Jimmy Reed and Sonny Thompson, among others. He could then play up to 12 musical instruments at one time. Ulmer experimented at this time with various instruments, including an early synthesizer and a Gretsch White Falcon, which he bought new in 1965 for $1,800.

In 2001, Ulmer returned to the area around Ellisville, Mississippi, where he lived for the rest of his life. In his latter days, using just a guitar as his accompaniment, he regularly performed locally. He also performed at the Juke Joint Festival in Clarksdale, the Shed Blues Festival in Ocean Springs, the Blues Today Symposium in Oxford and, in 2007, the Roots and Blues Festival in Parma, Italy. In June 2008, he made his debut appearance at the Chicago Blues Festival. He appeared in the 2008 documentary film M for Mississippi: A Road Trip through the Birthplace of the Blues. He became a vegetarian and shared his wisdom and recipes with his friends. In 2009, he was named Blues Artist of the Year by the Mississippi Delta Blues Society of Indianola. In the same year he performed at the 8th annual Ponderosa Stomp and the Notodden Blues Festival.

Ulmer recorded the album Blues Come Yonder, released by Hill Country Records in 2011; Jimbo Mathus was a member of the backing band. The tracks included eleven songs written by Ulmer and a cover of Hank Williams's "I Saw the Light". Ulmer performed at the Muddy Roots Music Festival in 2012 and 2013.

He appeared in the 2015 documentary film I Am the Blues.

Ulmer died of natural causes on February 14, 2016, at the age of 87, at his home in Ellisville, Mississippi.

== Discography ==
=== Albums ===
Year	Title	Label
2011	Blues Come Yonder	Hill Country Records

== See also ==
- List of Delta blues musicians
