= WhiskeyDick =

American music duo

- Origin: Fort Worth, Texas, United States
- Genres: Acoustic, hillbilly, country-metal, southern metal
- Years active: 2005–present
- Label: Rusty Knuckles
- Members: Fritz; Reverend Johnson
- Website: whiskeydickonline.com

WhiskeyDick is an American acoustic, country-metal duo formed by Fritz and Reverend Johnson in 2005. Their sixth studio album, The Bastard Sons of Texas, was released on the Rusty Knuckles label on July 28, 2015. WhiskeyDick has shared the stage with musicians including Ray Wylie Hubbard, Shooter Jennings, Hellyeah, and Scott H. Biram.

== Band members ==
- Fritz - vocals, guitar
- Reverend Johnson - lead guitar

== Discography ==
- Rebel Flags and Whiskey (2006)
- First Class White Trash (2009)
- Drunk as Hell (2010)
- The Wicked Roots (2012)
- From the Devil's Boots (2014)
- The Bastard Sons of Texas (2015)
