= Dr Sketchy's Anti-Art School =

American burlesque cabaret and life drawing event

Dr. Sketchy's Anti-Art School is both a burlesque cabaret and life drawing event originating in Williamsburg, Brooklyn, at the Lucky Cat. Dr. Sketchy's was founded in New York City in 2005, by illustrator and former artist's model Molly Crabapple and illustrator A.V. Phibes who later left to attend to her design studio.

Described as a cross between an old-fashioned life-drawing session and a new-wave cabaret, in a typical sketching session, artists will drink alcohol, sketch burlesque models, and play art games in a bar or venue like an art museum.

Crabapple will often travel around the world visiting different Dr. Sketchy's. As of 2009 there are branches of Dr. Sketchy's Anti-Art School all over the world.

The Official Dr. Sketchy's Rainy Day Colouring Book, by Molly Crabapple and John Leavitt, was released by Sepulculture Books in December 2006, and is in its second printing. Other projects include a 2008 pin-up calendar, a series of YouTube comedy shorts, a national tour, an art show, and a 21-show run at the Edinburgh Festival Fringe.

Artist Mark Reusch, aka Mister Reusch, designed premiere poster for the Bostom branch in 2007.

In 2010, a short documentary by Peter Bolte was made about Dr. Sketchy.

Despite conservatism in continents such as Asia, Dr. Sketchy's appears to be widely accepted in Tokyo, Singapore and the Philippines. The Singapore branch is headlined by Becca D'Bus. The Philippine branch is one of Crabapple's favorite new branches.

== Dr. Sketchy branches ==
Dr Sketchy started in NYC, and now has branches around the world. As of 2019 there are over 100 branches.
