= Black Jake and The Carnies =

American punk/bluegrass band

Black Jake & the Carnies, "The Original Kings of Crabgrass", are a punk/bluegrass band out of Ypsilanti, Michigan. "Crabgrass" refers to the group's stylistic mash-up of punk, bluegrass and americana.

The current and variously pseudonymous members are Jake "Black Jake" Zettelmaier (banjo, foot percussion, bones, lead vocals, lyrics, Graphic art), JJ Przewozniak (fiddle), Ozzie Andrews (bass guitar), Kyle Kipp (guitar), and Jade "Buttons The Clown" Ashekerra (accordion).

The band released its debut album, Where the Heather Don't Grow in 2008. The song "Happy Easter to Ya" was on the Jackson Citizen Patriot's list of best new songs of the year at number No. 21, beating out many better-known groups such as R.E.M.

Black Jake and the Carnies have performed live shows throughout Michigan, as well as in Ohio, Indiana, and Chicago, and a performance on Brown Student Radio's show, "Phoning It In". They recently had their debut performance at The Ark, Ann Arbor's venerable folk venue.
