= Possessed by Paul James =

American folk singer and musician

- Also known as: Possessed by Paul James
- Born: Konrad Wert; Immokalee, Florida
- Genres: Alternative country, folk, country, bluegrass, antifolk, blues, punk
- Instruments: banjo, guitar, fiddle, stomp box

Konrad Wert, known as Possessed by Paul James since 2005, is an American folk singer, songwriter and musician from Lee County, Florida. His music is composed of string instruments including banjo, guitar and fiddle with roots within folk, blues and punk. He was raised in a small Mennonite community among pacifists, service workers and transplants. He lives in Texas with his two sons selling his music online and going on tours. He was also a special education teacher in Kerrville, Texas and the surrounding TX Hill Country.

At the end of 2013 There Will Be Nights When I'm Lonely was released with Hillgrass Bluebilly Records. The album initially charted at #12 on Billboard Magazine under the Country/Bluegrass genre. National Public Radio, CMT, MTV featured both articles and tracks from the release. The New York Times stated "PPJ [was] a one man folk wonder" and was featured at one of the top concerts of the 2014 Pickathon Music Festival in Oregon. Releases following were As We Go Wandering in 2020 and Fighting For Our Own Survival in 2023.

== Discography ==
| Title | Album details | Peak positions |
| Title | Album details | US Grass |
|---|---|---|
| Possessed by Paul James | Release date: 2006; Label: SYA Records | — |
| Cold and Blind | Release date: March 10, 2008; Label: Voodoo Rhythm Records | — |
| The Revival Tour | Release date: 2009; Label: Ten Four Records | — |
| Feed the Family | Release date: September 21, 2010; Label: Hillgrass Bluebilly Records | — |
| Live at Antone's | Release date: 2012; Label: Normandeep Blues Records | — |
| There Will Be Nights When I'm Lonely | Release date: October 29, 2013; Label: Hillgrass Bluebilly Records | 12 |
| As We Go Wandering | Release date: 2020; Label: PPJ Records | — |
| Fighting For Our Own Survival | Release date: June 16, 2023; Label: PPJ Records | — |
"—" denotes releases that did not chart
