= Reno Divorce =

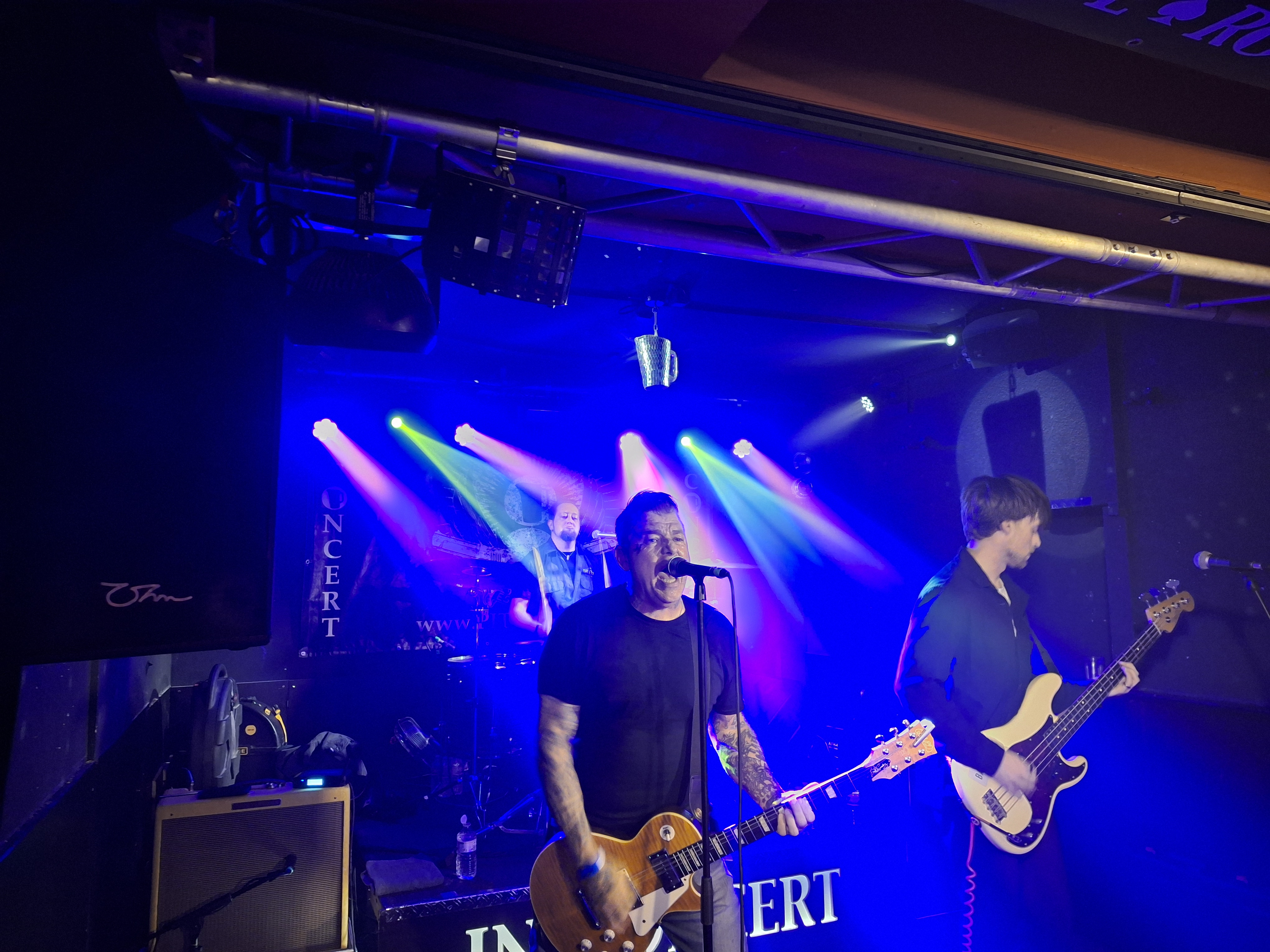
- Reno Divorce during a concert in 2024 in the Pitcher in Düsseldorf (Germany)

Background information
- Origin: Orlando, Florida, U.S.
- Genres: Punk rock, rockabilly, alternative country
- Years active: 1996–present
- Website: Bandcamp

Reno Divorce is an American punk rock band formed in 1996 in Orlando, Florida. The group is known for blending Southern California-style punk rock with elements of country, rockabilly, and Americana. After relocating to Denver, Colorado, the band gained a loyal following both in the United States and Europe through a series of independent album releases and international touring.

Reno Divorce was formed by guitarist and vocalist Brent Loveday in Orlando, Florida. Influenced by artists like Social Distortion, TSOL, and classic country, the band quickly carved out a distinct niche in the underground punk scene. Seeking a more vibrant and supportive environment for their music, the group relocated to Denver, Colorado in 2001.

Throughout the 2000s, Reno Divorce gained prominence through constant touring and critically acclaimed independent releases. The band shared stages with notable acts including Reverend Horton Heat, The Queers, and U.S. Bombs. Their energetic performances and roots-influenced sound attracted punk rock and rockabilly fans alike. In 2016, Reno Divorce released a live album titled Outsider, Escape from Berlin, recorded during their European tour. According to court records, Loveday has been arrested twice in recent years for domestic violence. The first was in Arapahoe County in October 2021, on misdemeanor charges of domestic violence harassment and harassing communication; the charges were dismissed. In May 2023, he was arrested in Jefferson County on felony charges of third-degree assault, simple assault and domestic violence assault; he was convicted of second-degree assault causing serious bodily injury. A 2024 European tour was cancelled after reports of Loveday physically abusing his partner at a show at JK ‘t Hoekske in Gierle, Belgium and the band has been inactive since.

== Musical style ==
Reno Divorce’s style is a mix of melodic punk, honky tonk, and rockabilly influences. Their lyrics often deal with themes of heartbreak, resilience, and working-class struggles. The band's sound is frequently compared to that of Social Distortion, but with a rawer, country-tinged twist.

== Band members ==
=== Current members ===
- Brent Loveday – vocals, guitar
- Dylan Shoemaker – bass
- Jason LaBella – drums

=== Former members ===
- Tim Jadowski – bass
- Tye Battistella – guitar
- Andrew Erich – drums

== Discography ==
=== Studio albums ===
- Naysayers and Yesmen (2002)
- You're Only Making It Worse (2003)
- Tears Before Breakfast (2009)
- Lover’s Leap (2014)

=== Live albums ===
- Outsider, Escape from Berlin (2016)

=== EPs and singles ===
- Ship of Fools (2016)
