= Pokey LaFarge =

American musician (born 1983)

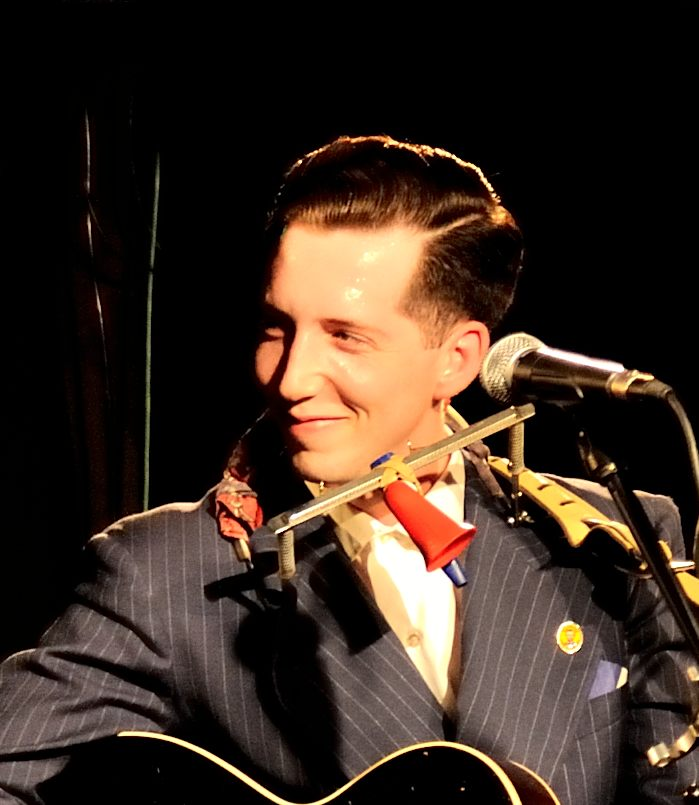
- Pokey LaFarge live at Reutlingen, Germany, May 2, 2012

Background information
- Born: Andrew Heissler; June 26, 1983 (age 43); Bloomington, Illinois, U.S.
- Origin: St. Louis, Missouri, U.S.
- Genres: Blues; folk; country; swing; jazz
- Occupations: Musician, singer-songwriter, actor
- Instruments: Vocals, guitar, mandolin
- Years active: 2006–present
- Labels: Third Man, Rounder, New West Records
- Spouse: Addie Hamilton (married 2023–present)
- Website: www.pokeylafarge.net

Pokey LaFarge (born Andrew Heissler, June 26, 1983) is an American musician and singer-songwriter.

== Early life ==
LaFarge was born Andrew Heissler in Bloomington, Illinois. The nickname "Pokey" was coined by his mother, who would scold him to hurry when he was a child.

LaFarge took an interest in history and literature during his childhood, and was greatly influenced by his grandfathers. One was a member of the St. Louis Banjo Club who gave him his first guitar and tenor banjo. The other, an amateur historian, taught him about the American Civil War and World War II.

In his early teens, he discovered an appreciation for older blues musicians like Skip James, Robert Wilkins, and Sleepy John Estes. After hearing Bill Monroe at age 16, LaFarge traded the guitar his grandfather had given him for a mandolin.

He adopted the name "Pokey LaFarge" because it sounded like what he was looking for musically during the time he was moving around the country. After graduating from University High School in 2001, at the age of seventeen he hitchhiked to the west coast and earned a living as a busker on streets, sidewalks, and pedestrian malls. He met Ryan Koenig and Joey Glynn of the St. Louis band The Rum Drum Ramblers while he was playing on a street in Asheville, North Carolina. Koenig and Glynn began playing with LaFarge in 2008, and the addition of Adam Hoskins in 2009 resulted in the formation of the South City Three.

== Career ==
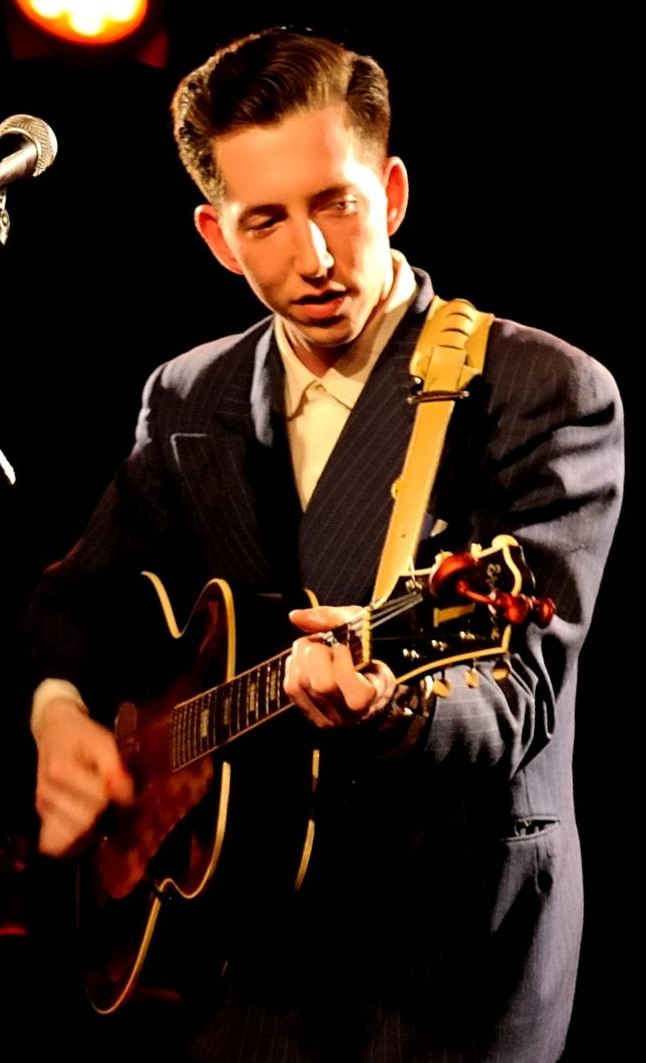
LaFarge in Reutlingen, Germany, May 2, 2012

LaFarge independently released his first album, Marmalade, in 2006. During the same year, he toured with The Hackensaw Boys. His second solo album, Beat, Move & Shake, was released in 2008 by Big Muddy Records.

Riverboat Soul, the first album with The South City Three, was recorded in July 2009 at the Nashville studio of producer Phil Harris using vintage instruments and electronics. It was released in 2010 by Free Dirt Records and won the Independent Music Award for Best Americana Album. The group's second album, Middle of Everywhere, won the same award in 2011. The band released Chittlin' Cookin' Time in Cheatham County produced by Jack White for his label Third Man Records. White asked the band to collaborate with him on the song "I Guess I Should Go to Sleep" for his album Blunderbuss, followed by opening for him on tour.

In 2013, LaFarge signed with Third Man Records and released his first album on the label, the eponymously titled Pokey LaFarge, accompanied by a larger band that included Chloe Feoranzo, Matthew Meyer, and T.J. Muller. During the next year, he signed with Rounder Records and released Something in the Water in April 2015.

In 2017 his album Manic Revelations was released on Rounder Records.

On January 22, 2020 LaFarge announced the release of a new album called Rock Bottom Rhapsodywhich was released on April 10 on the New West label.

LaFarge released his seventh studio album, In the Blossom of Their Shade, on October 15, 2021.

On February 13, 2024, LaFarge announced the release of a new album called Rhumba Country to be released on May 10, 2024, on the New West label.

== Appearances ==
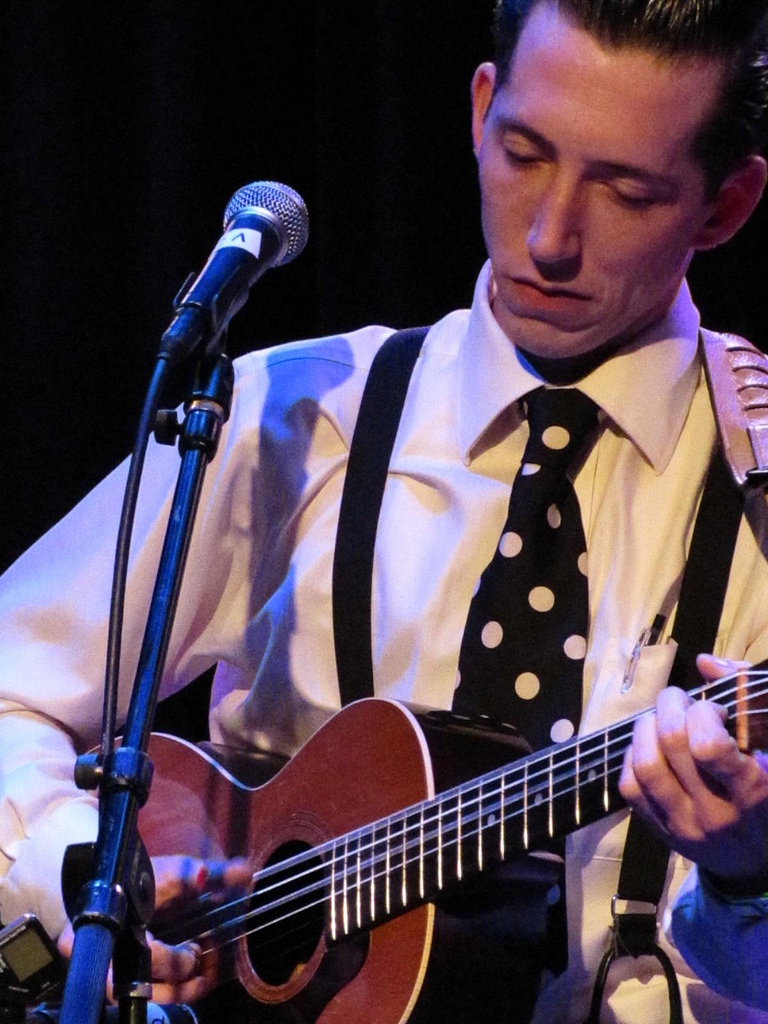
At the Square Room in Knoxville, Tennessee, April 17, 2010

- The group was featured by NPR on the Tiny Desk Concert series in 2011.
- LaFarge wrote a song for the soundtrack of Brick By Chance and Fortune, a documentary directed by friend of the band, Bill Streeter, released in 2011.
- LaFarge and the members of the South City Three played on "I Guess I Should Go To Sleep", a track from Jack White's album Blunderbuss released on April 24, 2012.
- On September 23, 2012, LaFarge contributed to the soundtrack of HBO's Boardwalk Empire with his rendition of the pop standard "Lovesick Blues". The song was featured in the last scene and end credits of the episode "Spaghetti & Coffee"
- LaFarge collaborated with JD McPherson on a rendition of country legend Bob Wills' "Good Old Oklahoma", released on June 28, 2013. All of the proceeds from the track go to the Oklahoma City Community Fund's Tornado Relief endowment.
- Pokey & The South City Three recorded Jack White's track "Red's Theater of The Absurd" which appeared in The Lone Ranger's original score. The film was released on July 3, 2013 and the band made a brief appearance in the film.
- The band played on episode 136 of The Marty Stuart Show.
- The band appeared in the documentary film The American Epic Sessions directed by Bernard MacMahon and recorded "St. Louis Blues" on the first electrical sound recording system from the 1920s. The film premiered June 6, 2017.
- The band appeared on Conan on August 17, 2017 and performed "Better Man Than Me"
- He appeared as "Hank Snow" in the 2017 – 2018 CMT Television Series "Sun Records"
- He appeared as "Theodore" in the Netflix film The Devil All the Time and contributed to the soundtrack.
- He appeared in the upcoming film O'Dessa.

== Musical style ==
The group is thought to be "artfully dodgy ambassadors for old-time music, presenting and representing the glories of hot swing, early jazz and ragtime blues" who have "made riverboat chic cool again."

=== Genre ===
His repertoire consists of a mix of Americana, early jazz, ragtime for string instruments, country blues, Western swing, Vaudeville, and Appalachian folk.

=== Influences ===
Musicians that have influenced him include Howlin' Wolf, Jimmie Rodgers, Bill Monroe, Milton Brown and the Musical Brownies, Modern Mountaineers, Sleepy John Estes, Henry Townsend, Frank Fairfield, Fats Waller, Emmett Miller, Marc Bolan, Peter Lafarge, and Willie Dixon.

== Personal life ==
LaFarge married singer Addie Hamilton in Camden, Maine on September 29, 2023.

== Members ==
=== Current members ===
- Pokey LaFarge – lead vocals, guitar, guitjo (2006–present)
- Andrea DeMarcus - bass, harmony vocals (2025–present)
- Elizabeth Goodfellow - drums, harmony vocals (2025)
- Erik Miron – guitar, trumpet (2022–present)
- Hank Mehren – keyboard, organ (2022–present)
- Addie Hamilton – harmony vocals (2021–present)

=== Former members ===
- Adam Hoskins – guitar (2009–2018)
- Joey Glynn – upright bass (2008–2018)
- Ryan Koenig – harmonica, washboard, guitar, guitjo, snare drum (2008–2018)
- Matthew Meyer – drums (2014–2018)
- Chloe Feoranzo – clarinet, saxophone (2013–2015)
- Timothy Muller – trumpet, trombone (2013–2015)
- Andrew Guterman – drums, harmony vocals (2021– 2025)
- Kevin Carducci – bass, harmony vocals (2021– 2025)

== Discography ==
=== Studio albums ===
- 2006: Marmalade (self-released)
- 2008: Beat, Move, and Shake (Big Muddy)
- 2010: Riverboat Soul (Free Dirt)
- 2011: Middle of Everywhere (Free Dirt)
- 2012: Live in Holland (Continental Song City)
- 2013: Pokey LaFarge (Third Man)
- 2015: Something in the Water (Rounder)
- 2017: Manic Revelations (Rounder)
- 2020: Rock Bottom Rhapsody (New West) (release date 4/10/20)
- 2021: In the Blossom of Their Shade (New West) (released 10/15/2021)
- 2024: Rhumba Country (New West) (released 5/10/24)
- 2026: Travelin’ with Pokey LaFarge: Voice and Guitar Vol. I (Boxer Boy Records)

=== EPs and singles ===
- 2011: "'Chittlin' Cookin' Time in Cheatham County'" (Third Man)
- 2013: "Central Time/St. Louis Crawl" (Third Man)
- 2016: "Goodbye, Barcelona" b/w "Blue Morning Lullaby" (Rounder)
- 2017: "Riot in the Streets" (Rounder)
- 2025: “Ain’t No Grave (featuring Addie Hamilton)” (Boxer Boy Records)
- 2026: Rent Money (ONErpm)

=== Compilations and other appearances ===
- 2009: Face a Frowning World: An E.C. Ball Memorial Album (Track: "Poor Old Country Lad")
- 2009: The White Belt (with Joe Manning) (Karate Body)
- 2012: Blunderbuss- Jack White (Third Man) (Track "I Guess I Should Go To Sleep")
- 2013: You Don't Know Me: Rediscovering Eddy Arnold -Eddy Arnold (Plowboy) (Track: "Lovebug Itch")
- 2013: Boardwalk Empire Soundtrack Volume 2 (AVKCO) (Track "Lovesick Blues")
- 2017: Music from The American Epic Sessions: Original Motion Picture Soundtrack (Lo-Max/Columbia/Third Man) (Tracks: "St. Louis Blues" & "Josephine")

== Honors, distinctions, and awards ==
- 2011 Independent Music Awards: Riverboat Soul – Best Americana Album
- 2012 Independent Music Awards: Middle of Everywhere – Best Americana Album
- 2014 U-High Alumni Hall of Fame: Inducted by University High School in Normal, Illinois at the U-High Alumni Association Awards and Recognition Program on 26 September 2014
- 2017 Ameripolitan Music Awards Western Swing Male – Winner
