= Reverend Beat-Man =

Swiss musician

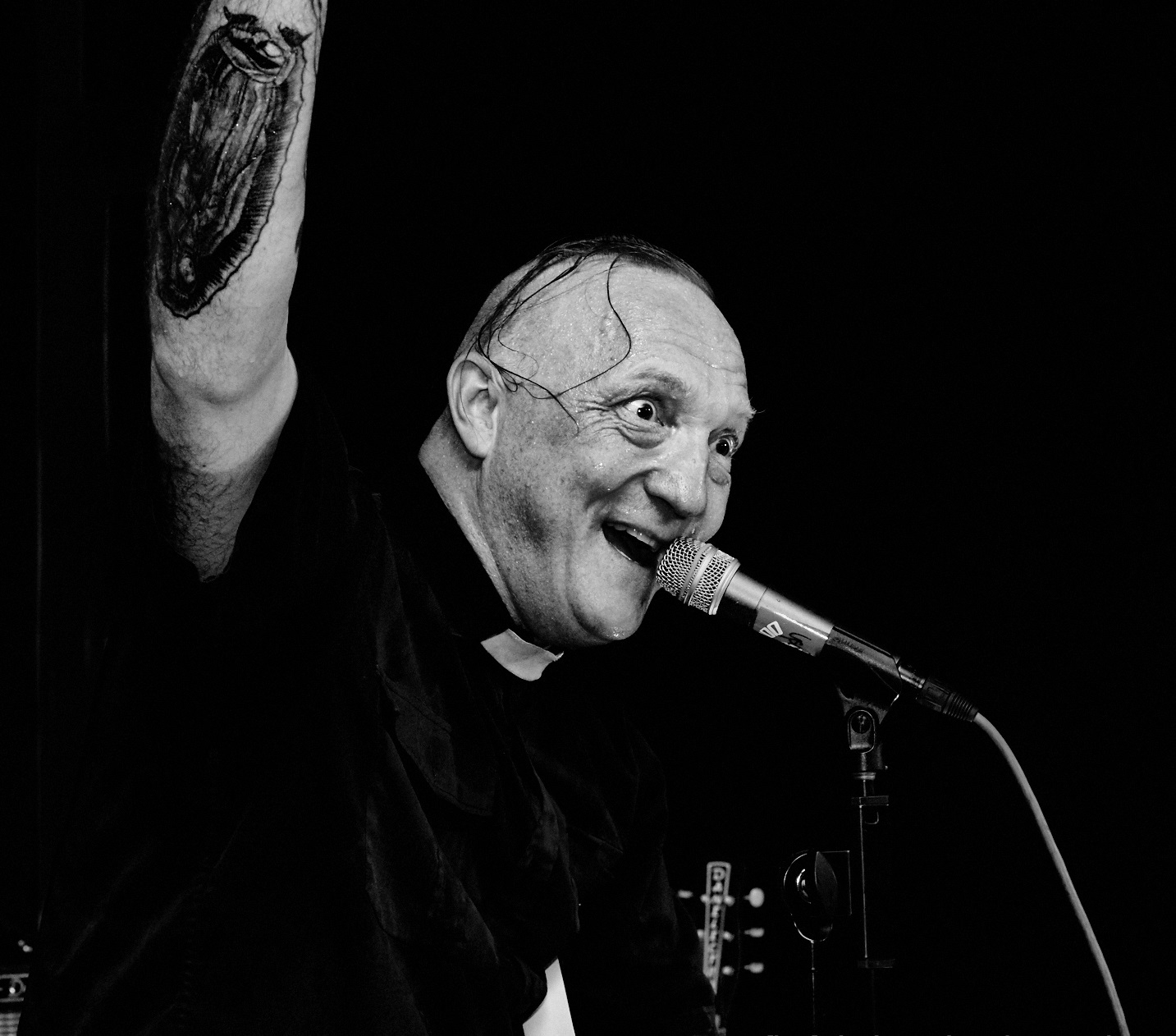
- Reverend Beat-Man in 2015

Background information
- Also known as: Beat-Man; Lightning Beat-Man
- Born: Beat Zeller; 1967 (age 58–59); Switzerland
- Genres: Psychobilly, rockabilly, rock and roll, blues
- Occupations: Musician, DJ, singer-songwriter, businessman
- Instruments: Guitar, drums, vocals, harmonica
- Years active: 1980–present
- Labels: Voodoo Rhythm Records, various
- Website: http://www.voodoorhythm.com

Beat Zeller (born 1967), better known as Beat-Man or Reverend Beat-Man, is a Swiss musician, DJ and record company owner. He performs as a one-man band, as the leader of psychobilly band The Monsters, and with other bands, in a style described as primitive rock and roll and as "gospel blues trash". He is also the founder and head of Voodoo Rhythm Records, a company based in Bern, Switzerland.

== Career ==
By his own account, he made his first recordings at age thirteen under the name Taeb Zerfall on his own Zerfall Tapes label. In 1984, he changed his name to Lightning Beat-Man, performing "a mix between Elvis Presley and die Einstürzende Neubauten". He then presented a one-man wrestling show – "The idea was to fight on stage against myself, sometimes me versus my guitar...and always win!" – before it became a two-man show and then a wrestling circus.

His group, The Monsters, were formed in Bern in 1986. He started performing as Reverend Beat-Man in 1999, apparently after a vision involving a mix of Robert Johnson, Marilyn Monroe, Tura Satana, Bettie Page, Iggy Pop and Elvis. He plays guitar and drums, performing "a river of sound wholly unique to him, offering his many listeners a sacrament of primitive rock'n'roll, gospel trash, surreal folk, and wild blues", sometimes with a female dancer known as Panti-Christ. He has described his greatest influences as Howlin' Wolf and Hasil Adkins. He also works as a DJ, presenting "mostly black R&B and blues stuff, garage, rockabilly, and.. jazz and weird shit from my record collection."

His albums have included Get on Your Knees (2001), credited to Reverend Beat-Man and the Un-Believers; Your Favorite Position Is on Your Knees (2006), credited to Reverend Beat-Man and the Church of Herpes; and Surreal Folk Blues Gospel Trash Vols. 1 and 2 (2007). He has also released a number of singles, mostly on the Squooge record label based in Berlin.

He has performed at the Montreux Jazz Festival, and toured around Europe, the UK, the US, Argentina, Japan and elsewhere.

Beat-Man founded Voodoo Rhythm Records in 1992 and continues to run it today. Described as "a haven for misfits", some of the other artists on the label include Delaney Davidson, the Dead Brothers, King Khan and the Shrines, Hipbone Slim & The Knee Tremblers, the Pussywarmers, and the "mysterious fifties rocker", Jerry J. Nixon.

His single "If I Knew"', featuring Nicole Izobel García, was one of the first four VinylVideo singles ever made. It was released in 2018.
