= Picture disc =

Gramophone record with an image on the playing surface

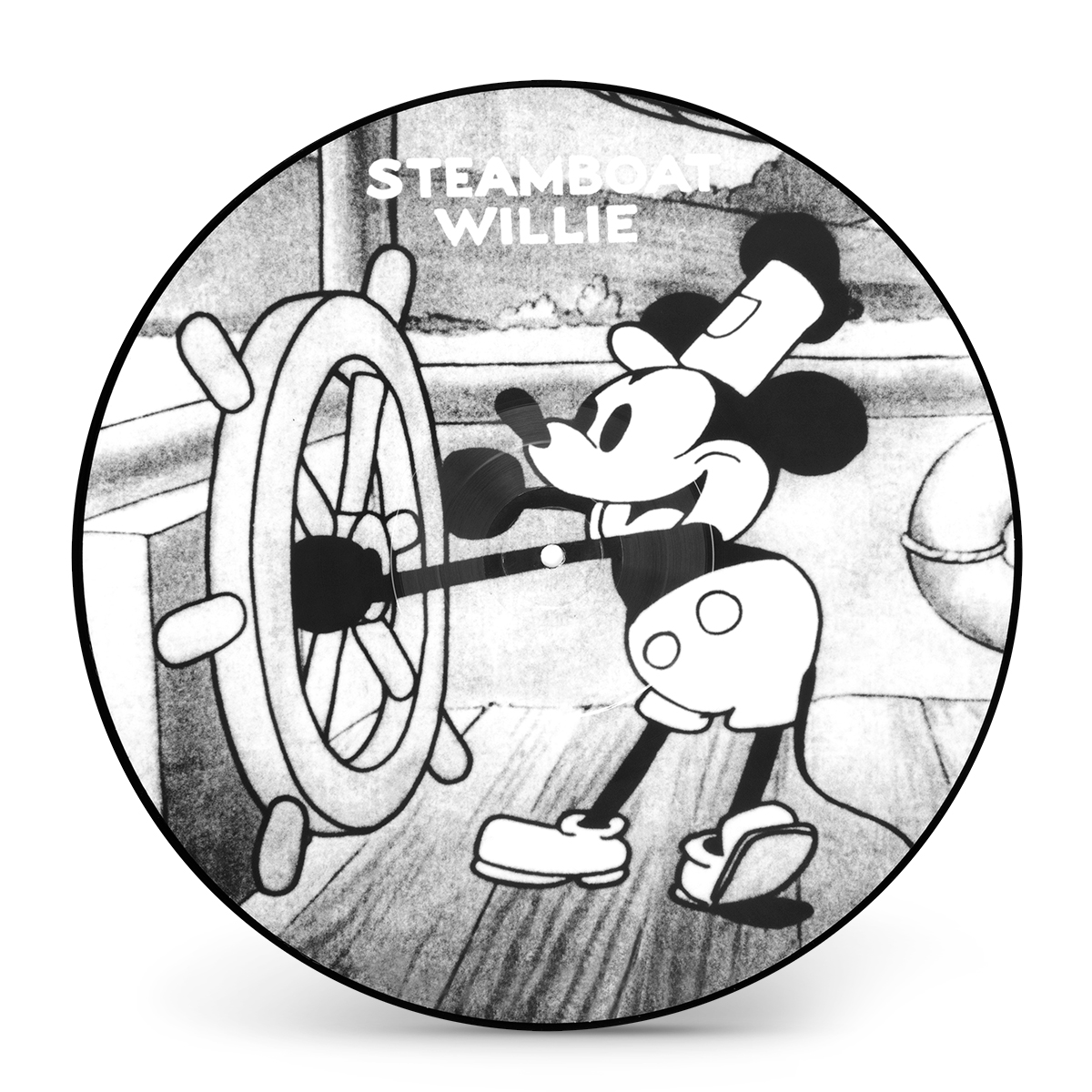
Walt Disney's Mickey Mouse Steamboat Willie, released in 2018 on picture disc

Picture discs are gramophone (phonograph) records that show images on their playing surface, rather than being of plain black or colored vinyl. Collectors traditionally reserve the term "picture disc" for records with graphics that extend at least partly into the actual playable grooved area, distinguishing them from picture label discs, which have a specially illustrated and sometimes very large label, and picture back discs, which are illustrated on one unplayable side only.

Curved Air's Air Conditioning (Warner Bros. 1971) was one of the first modern picture discs. This second edition pressing of the disc differs from the very rare first edition in that the credits have been edited. The album which was designed by Mark Hanau won the NME's (UK) Special Award for Best Album Art in 1971. Only 2000 of both editions were ever pressed.

== History ==
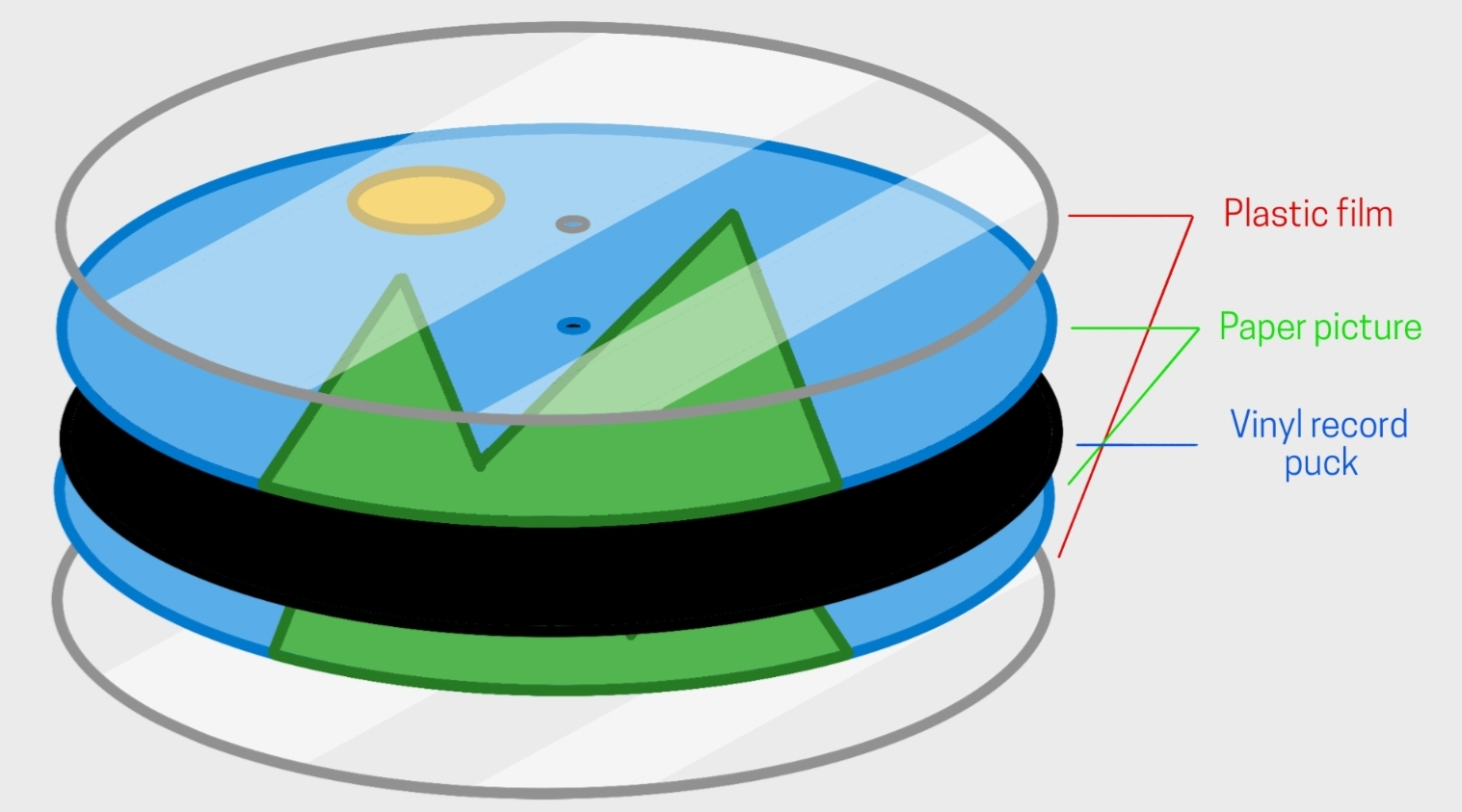
Layers of a picture disc: the vinyl record puck is sandwiched between two pieces of printed paper and two pieces of thin plastic — the pressing together of these layers results in the finished product

=== 1945 and earlier ===
A few seven-inch black shellac records issued by the Canadian Berliner Gramophone Company around 1900 had the "His Master's Voice" dog-and-gramophone trademark lightly etched into the surface of the playing area as an anti-piracy measure, technically qualifying them as picture discs by some definitions.

Apart from those debatable claimants for the title of "first", the earliest picture records were not discs, strictly speaking, but rectangular picture postcards with small, round, transparent celluloid records glued onto the illustrated side. Such cards were in use by about 1909. Later, the recordings were pressed into a transparent coating that covered the entire picture side of the card. This novelty product idea proved to have a very long life. In the 1950s and throughout the rest of the vinyl era, picture postcard records, usually oversized and often featuring a garish color photograph of a tourist attraction or typical local scenery, were issued in several countries. These and similar small novelty picture records on laminated paper or thin cardboard, such as were occasionally bound into magazines or featured on the backs of boxes of breakfast cereal, are usually not classed with the larger and sturdier discs that were sold in record stores or used as promotional gifts by record companies, but a few featured famous performers and are now eagerly sought by collectors of those artists' records.

The first picture discs of substantial size, sold as records meant only to be looked at and played, not put into a mailbox, appeared in the 1920s. Their first wave of significant popularity did not arrive until the start of the 1930s, when several companies in several countries began issuing them. Some were illustrated with photographs or artwork simply designed to be appropriate to the musical contents, but some graphics also promoted films in which the recorded songs had been introduced, and a few were blatant advertising that had little or no connection with the recording. Some politicians and demagogues explored the potential of the discs as a medium for propaganda. Adolf Hitler and British fascist Oswald Mosley were each featured on their own special picture discs.

Most of these records were made of a simple sheet of fairly thin printed cardboard with a very thin plastic coating and their audio quality was substandard. Some were more sturdy and well-made and they equaled or actually surpassed the audio quality of ordinary records, which were still made of a gritty shellac compound that introduced a lot of background noise. In 1933, RCA Victor in the U.S. issued a few typical cardboard-based picture records but was unhappy with their quality and soon began making an improved type. A rigid blank shellac core disc was sandwiched between two illustrated sheets and each side was then topped with a substantial layer of high-quality clear plastic into which the recording was pressed. Like nearly all records being made for the general public, they were recorded at 78 rpm, but one issue was recorded at 33⅓ rpm, a speed already in use for special purposes which Victor was then unsuccessfully attempting to introduce into home use. It was the first 33⅓ rpm picture disc and the only one made until many years later. These were deluxe picture discs, priced much higher than ordinary records, and they sold in very small numbers. In the early 1930s the entire record industry was being devastated by a worldwide economic depression and the proliferation of the new medium of radio, which made a wide variety of music available free of charge. Picture discs of all kinds were among the casualties.

=== 1946 to 1969 ===
With the Great Depression and World War II no longer around to interfere with such modest luxuries, the picture disc reemerged in 1946, when Tom Saffardy's Sav-Way Industries began issuing Vogue Records. Vogues were a well-made product physically similar to RCA Victor's improved 1933 issues except that their core discs were aluminum instead of shellac. The Victor discs had been illustrated in high Art Deco style, often in sober but elegant black-and-white. Vogue's discs featured artwork done in the styles typical of 1940s commercial illustration and pin-up art, most of it gaudily colored, some dramatic, some humorous, some very cartoonish. The audio quality was excellent by contemporary standards and they featured professional talent, most with names known to the general public, but Vogue was handicapped by the lack of any big "hit" names. Top-tier talent was usually under exclusive contract to companies such as Mercury Records, for whom Sav-Way manufactured special attention-grabbing, quiet-surfaced picture discs that Mercury distributed only to radio disc jockeys. Vogue records retailed for US$1.05, about fifty percent more than ordinary ten-inch 78 rpm records. The novelty of the colorful discs attracted interest and sales at first, but success proved elusive and Vogue went out of business in 1947 after fewer than 100 catalog items bearing the Vogue logo had been issued.

More commercially successful and long-lived were some of the children's picture discs marketed by the Record Guild of America from the late 1940s through the 1950s. Their most popular and well-known issues resembled Vogue records in their general style of illustration and use of high-quality materials, but they were only 7 inches in diameter, had no reinforcing core disc, and sold for a much lower price. Other companies such as Voco also made picture discs for children.

Red Raven Movie Records, introduced in 1956, were a very unusual type of children's picture disc. They featured a sequence of sixteen interwoven animation frames arrayed around the center and were to be played at 78 rpm on a turntable with a short spindle, on which a small sixteen-mirrored device, a variety of the praxinoscope, was placed. Gazing into this as the record played, the user saw an endlessly repeating high-quality animated cartoon scene appropriate to the song. Only the earliest Red Raven discs, which were of the coated cardboard type but reinforced with a metal rim and spindle hole grommet, were true picture discs. The more common later issues were larger "picture label discs" made of solid colored opaque, translucent or transparent plastic, with the recording in a band surrounding a very large label that carried the animation graphics. In the 1960s similar products were introduced in several countries under various brand names—Teddy in France and the Netherlands, Mamil Moviton in Italy, etc.

Picture discs of the large and solid Victor-Vogue type were very rarely issued in the U.S. between the demise of Vogue in 1947 and the end of the 1960s, but several lines of picture discs, such as the French Saturnes, were produced in Europe and Japan during these years.

=== 1970 and beyond ===
A new generation of picture discs appeared in the 1970s. The first serious pictures discs, with acceptable but still inferior sound quality, were developed by Metronome Records GmbH, a subsidiary of Elektra Records. These new picture discs were made by creating a five-layer lamination consisting of a core of black vinyl with kiln-dried paper decals on either side and then outer skins of clear vinyl film, manufactured by 3M, on the outsides. In manufacture, one layer of the clear film was first placed on the bed of the press on top of the stamper, then a "puck" of hot black vinyl from the extruder was placed on top of that. Finally the top print and vinyl film layer was added (held by a retracting pin in the upper profile usually employed to retain the upper paper label) and the press closed. Problems with poor vinyl flow caused by the paper texture and air released from the paper (that had not been removed in the kiln drying process) plagued the process.

The first 'modern' rock picture disc was introduced as an assortment of artists such as the MC5 and The Doors. It was released in 1969 by Metronome of Germany and entitled "Psychedelic Underground - Off 2, Hallucinations". The second release was the British progressive rock band Curved Air's first album, Air Conditioning, a UK issue (1970). One commercially issued American picture disc is To Elvis: Love Still Burning, a collection of 11 Elvis Presley tribute songs by various artists, issued in May 1978. Both sides of the album (Fotoplay FSP-1001) picture Presley.

Initially picture discs were usually promotional items pressed in small quantities, but by the late 1970s they began to be produced as commercial products in large quantities. In the 1980s numerous commercial picture discs were released, but by the end of the decade, the interest in picture discs had declined as consumers began transitioning away from vinyl records towards newer formats such as cassette tapes and compact discs.

== Types ==
On some picture discs, the images used were meant to create an optical illusion while the record was rotating on the turntable (as in the B side of Curved Air's Airconditioning), while others used the visual effect to add to the music — for example, the 1979 picture disc of Fischer-Z's The Worker featured a train which endlessly commuted around the turntable, reinforcing the song's message.

Later picture discs included liquid light show style fluids between the vinyl, Rowlux 3D effect film, diffraction rainbow film, metal flake (vide examples here), pressure-sensitive liquid crystals that changed color when the record was picked up, and a real holographic record.

Shaped picture discs became common in the 1980s. These are mostly considered to be collecting items, rather than for listening as the sound quality is inferior to regular vinyl. Shaped picture discs are manufactured at full 12 inch size and then cut in various shapes using a cutting tool. Shaped picture discs are always singles rather than albums and are usually limited to a few thousand copies.

Interview discs are quite commonly pressed as picture discs as well.

In the 1950s, "movie" discs showing a repeating animation were produced, using the Praxinoscope technique, an example here:

== List of (selected) picture discs ==
=== First modern picture discs 1970 to 1979 ===
- Off II - Hallucinations featuring Various Artists (1969) The first modern picture disc pressed in Germany and released as a promotional disc.
- Air Conditioning by Curved Air (1970) One of the first modern picture disc conceived and designed by Mark Hanau.
- Tubular Bells by Mike Oldfield (1973) was released as a picture disc as well as its regular release
- Farewell Aunty Jack by Rory O'Donoghue and Grahame Bond (1973) was the first Australian picture disc
- Magical Love by Saturnalia c.1973. First non-compilation album to be advertised on television in Europe.
- Black Sabbath by Black Sabbath (Rare - Shows the cover art of their first album) 1974 (re-release of album as picture disc)
- The Dark Side of the Moon by Pink Floyd (1973) - picture disk edition 1974 or 1975.
- Boston by Boston 1976.
- Dreamboat Annie by Heart 1976. Shows Dreamboat Annie cover on front and back with text indicating the side number.
- Magazine by Heart 1978. Same as Dreamboat Annie except with Magazine's cover. Both were under the Mushroom Records label.
- To Elvis: Love Still Burning by 11 various artists, including Ral Donner. Produced by Jerry Osborne's Fotoplay label, and distributed by Pickwick International, has 11 songs of tribute to Elvis Presley (1978). Features a portrait of Elvis by Marge Nichols on both sides. The first of many Elvis picture discs, and North America's first commercially issued picture disc album by anyone — an event reported on the front page of Billboard magazine (August 28, 1978 issue).
- Elvis: A Legendary Performer, Vol. 3. Elvis Presley (1978). Issued by RCA about six months after the Fotoplay picture disc.
- Sgt. Pepper's Lonely Hearts Club Band by The Beatles (1978) Released in conjunction with the Robert Stigwood film production by that name.
- Q: Are We Not Men? A: We Are Devo by Devo (1978) - Virgin Records LP - still frames from Devo's The Truth About De-Evolution film.
- "My Best Friend's Girl" by The Cars (1978) - graphic of old-style car on white background
- "Just What I Needed" by The Cars (1978) - graphic of old-style car on blue background
- Blondes Have More Fun by Rod Stewart (1978) - Artist is hugging a blonde woman with her back to the camera, and on the B side, the artist has the same pose, but with a brunette.
- Hemispheres by Rush (1978) - Contains album cover on both sides of the disc.
- "Hard Love" by Shaun Cassidy (1978) - 12" and 7" picture discs from Under Wraps - Contains album cover on both sides of the disc.
- Translumadafractadisc (artists include Sid Vicious)
- Pieces of Eight by Styx 1978. Has album cover on front side with a picture of the band on the back.
- Who Are You by The Who (1978) - has the regular album cover with the band posed amid electrical cables and PA equipment
- Living in the USA by Linda Ronstadt (1978) Picture of inner sleeve roller skating pic on both sides. Alison single from Living in the USA by Linda Ronstadt (1978) same picture both sides of 45. Citation of fact Asylum Records.
- The Lord of the Rings soundtrack by Leonard Rosenman - limited edition double LP picture disc with four scenes from the 1978 movie by Ralph Bakshi (1978).
- Max Webster British single for their single Paradise Skies CLP 16079 from the album A Million Vacations Capitol Records UK Catalog number EST-1-11937 (1979)
- "Are 'Friends' Electric?" by Tubeway Army (1979). 7" picture disc, 20,000 issued.
- The Worker by Fischer-Z (1979) - cartoon image of a train arranged around the edge of the record
- Light My Fire by Amii Stewart (1979) - photographic image of the singer against a pink background
- Oceans of Fantasy by Boney M (1979) inner cover used as front cover back of disc as per standard cover .
- Never Trust a Pretty Face by Amanda Lear (1979)Covers As per standard album front & Back cover issued in thick plastic cover with sticker with track list .
- Gold by Jefferson Starship - a picture of the 1976-78 lineup of the band on both sides.
- "Driver's Seat" by Sniff 'n' the Tears (1979) - a leggy woman holding a gun startles a black cat
- Off the Wall by Michael Jackson (1979) - same image of original album front and back
- L.A (Light) Album, The Beach Boys (1979) - Logo from album cover on one side, band photos from inner sleeve on the other.

=== 1980s ===
- Special Brew by Bad Manners (1980): Photo of Buster Bloodvessel coveting a pint of the drink of the same name.
- Snow White and the Seven Dwarfs (soundtrack to the Walt Disney film) (1980)
- "One of Us" b/w "Should I Laugh or Cry" by ABBA (1981): A-side with Agnetha Fältskog and Frida Lyngstad ("One of Us")/B-side with Benny Andersson and Björn Ulvaeus
- Dare by the Human League (1981)
- Anthem by Toyah (1981)
- "Goblin Girl" b/w "Pink Napkins" 12" single by Frank Zappa (1981)
- Turn Up the Night 12" single by Black Sabbath (1982) (Rare - Shows a Lucifer-like figure silhouetted against a cross)
- Bat Out of Hell by Meat Loaf (1982) (reissue of the 1977 album, has album artwork on the disc)
- Planets by Eloy (1982)
- "That's Good" b/w "Speed Racer" by Devo (1982): 12" single.
- Got No Brains by Bad Manners (1982): Cartoon-like image of Buster Bloodvessel's brain flying out of his head.
- "House of Fun" by Madness (1982): Still photo from the promo video.
- E.T. the Extra-Terrestrial by John Williams (1982): Close up of title character's head on the front and with the bike over the moon shot on the back (both front and back are stills from movie).
- Driving In My Car by Madness (1982): Close-up photo of a Morris Minor hubcap.
- Monkee Business by The Monkees (1982): A side color photo of band, B side b&w promotional photos and monkey shape.
- "Countdown" b/w "New World Man" by Rush (1982): 7-inch single shaped like a space shuttle.
- Freebird by Lynyrd Skynyrd (1982): A picture of a skeleton holding a gun.
- Baby Snakes soundtrack album by Frank Zappa (1982): Frank Zappa's face.
- Let's Dance LP by David Bowie (1983): Serious Moonlight Tour concert photo and album cover photo.
- Thriller by Michael Jackson (1983): Several different picture discs with artwork from the album photoshoot.
- War by U2 (1983)
- Colour by Numbers by Culture Club (1983)
- Mushi by The Stalin (1983)
- Just a Dream by Nena (1984): 10" Band photo.
- Dreamtime by The Cult (1984): Band photo.
- Poland (double LP) by Tangerine Dream (1984): Album photos.
- 14 Greatest Hits (LP) by Michael Jackson and the Jackson 5 (1984): Drawing of 3 Jackson brothers and old band photo.
- Victory by The Jackson 5 (1984)
- Legend LP by Bob Marley (1984): Album photo.
- Keep Moving LP by Madness (1984): Photo of the band on a running track.
- Make It Big by Wham! (1984) (picture disc edition)
- "Pride (In the Name of Love)" by U2 (1984): 7-inch single with same track listing but different (color) photos of the band.
- Waking Up with the House on Fire by Culture Club (1984)
- Creeping Death by Metallica (1984)
- Ride the Lightning by Metallica (1984) 1985 release, limited edition only.
- Fugazi by Marillion (1984)
- Slide It In by Whitesnake (1984): Special US Mix version available in the UK.
- The Second Time by Kim Wilde (1984)
- The Touch by Kim Wilde (1984)
- Miami Vice Theme by Jan Hammer (1985)
- Loving the Alien by David Bowie (1985): 7 and 12 Inch versions.
- Walk This Way by Run D.M.C & Aerosmith (1986) 12"
- Master of Puppets by Metallica (1986)
- Electric by The Cult (1987): Gold vinyl with a band photo.
- Hysteria by Def Leppard (1987)
- Something Special by Sabrina (1988)
- So Far, So Good... So What! by Megadeth (1988): A skeleton dressed in combat gear holding a machine gun.
- "Wake Up!" a hit sampler (Bangles, REO Speedwagon, Earth, Wind and Fire...) issued by Honda (the motor people) (1988): Showing a comic style full continental breakfast on the one side, and the "H" logo on the reverse.
- Special Edition Live EP by Ozzy Osbourne (1988)
- "Animal (Fuck Like a Beast)" by W.A.S.P. (1988): Watercolor of a Dobermann mounting a woman's leg; photo of Lawless on the B side.
- Disintegration by The Cure (1989)
- For Ladies Only by Killdozer (1989): Painting of a young woman in a negligee with photos of band members on the reverse side.

=== Post 1980s ===
- Sweet Soul Sister by The Cult (1990): 12" single, different band photo on both sides.
- Zoo Station by U2 (1992): US 12" promo featuring the Zoo TV and U2 logos from the tour.
- Nightswimming by R.E.M. (1993)
- The Hearts Filthy Lesson by David Bowie (BMG UK, 1995): Graphically manipulated images from the lyric pages of the 1995 album Outside for the A side and B side songs.
- Let It Rain by East 17 was released on a limited edition picture disc which was in the shape of an arrow (1995)
- The Best of Both Worlds by Marillion (1996)
- POP by U2 (1997): Front side is the same four-paned portraits on the CD cover, but the back side is different, featuring a rainbow of colors and a picture of each band member taken from the Discothèque video (looks official, some say this is a bootleg).
- Im Dienste des Sozialismus by IFA Wartburg (1998): Pictures of Queen Silvia of Sweden and Erich Honecker.
- This Afternoon's Malady by Jejune (1998, Big Wheel Recreation): a-side has alternate cover art, b-side features photo of the members, includes the album in an abridged form.
- Californication by Red Hot Chili Peppers (1999)
- s/t 10" by Song of Zarathustra (2000 blood of the young)
- Exploiting Dysfunction by Cephalic Carnage (2000): Side A and B feature the original cover/back artwork by Wes Benscoter.
- Heaven by Live (2003): European 7-inch single containing title track plus Forever May not be Long Enough (Egyptian Dreams Remix) as a B-side. An unknown quantity were mispressed with remixes of Let's Get Ill by P. Diddy.
- Inertiatic ESP by The Mars Volta (2003): Artwork by Storm Thorgerson.
- Televators by The Mars Volta (2003): Artwork by Storm Thorgerson.
- Puta by Khima France (2004) Limited Edition 7".
- I, Lucifer by The Real Tuesday Weld (UK only, 2004)
- Hell Yeah! by HorrorPops (2004): Side A has an altered version of the cover artwork and side B contains the track listing.
- Split by Agalloch/Nest (2004): 10" Picture Disc.
- Filthy Danceheng EP by Baron Mordant (Mordant Music UK, 2004): Image of creepy tutonic child on a side, track list and 1970s looking child on reverse.
- Blood Rushed to Head by Portion Control (portion-control.net UK, 2005): 7" portion Control logo on both sides.
- Analord 10 by AFX (re-release) (2005)
- The Trooper by Iron Maiden (1983) 7-inch single was re-released in 2005 as a picture disc.
- Preaching the "End-Time" Message by Eyehategod (2005): Limited to 500 copies.
- Lateralus by Tool (2005): Double picture disc album. Limited edition only.
- The Hand that Feeds by Nine Inch Nails (2005)
- Death on the Road by Iron Maiden (2005): Double picture disc album, disc 1 contains artwork and disc 2 has pictures from live shows.
- The Widow by The Mars Volta (2005): Artwork by Storm Thorgerson.
- L'Via L'Viaquez by The Mars Volta (2005): 10" Picture Disc.
- Scab Dates by The Mars Volta (2005): Dbl 12" Picture Disc LP.
- Omar Rodriguez by Omar Rodriguez-Lopez (2005)
- Gold Digger by Kanye West (2005): 12" single has a plain gold coloured picture disc.
- Mezmerize and Hypnotize by System of a Down (2005)
- "Feel Good Inc." by Gorillaz (2005): Features a drawing of the windmill island from the video.
- The 12th record from the 7" of the Month Club by NOFX (2006): Side A: Picture of band, Side B: Cartoon Hotdogs - limited to 3000.
- Sam's Town by The Killers (2006)
- Donuts by J Dilla (2006)
- The Shining EP by J Dilla (2006)
- Age of Winters by The Sword (2006): limited to 500 copies. Side A features original CD Artwork, Side B a track listing and logo.
- The Pick of Destiny by Tenacious D (2006)
- Get Warmer by Bomb the Music Industry! (2006): Features a pictures of parks and track listings on the A and B sides.
- Fine as Fuck by Electrosexual and Scream Club featuring Peaches (2006): Features a collage made by Electrosexual and a logo created by French graffiti artist Tilt. Limited to 500 copies, France Rock Machine Records.
- Gold Lion by Yeah Yeah Yeahs (2006): 7" Features a drawing of a lion.
- Lycanthrope by +44 (2006): Features a picture of the band on one side of the single and the band logo on the other.
- Hip Hop Is Dead by Nas (2006): 12" single has a picture of Nas with title of the song on the A side and Nas's logo on the B side.
- Infinity on High by Fall Out Boy (2007)
- From Yesterday by Thirty Seconds to Mars (2007)
- Here Come the Waterworks by Big Business (2007)
- Catch You 12-inch single by Sophie Ellis-Bextor (2007)
- Me and My Imagination 12-inch single by Sophie Ellis-Bextor (2007)
- Festival Thyme by ...And You Will Know Us by the Trail of Dead (2008)
- Pedrophilia by Busy P on Ed Banger Records (2008)
- Pocket Piano by DJ Mehdi (2008)
- "God Has a Voice, She Speaks Through Me" by CocoRosie (2008)
- Aim and Ignite by Fun (2009)
- Time Warp / Join the Dots by Sub Focus (2009)
- The Fame Monster by Lady Gaga (2009)
- "Ignorance" by Paramore (2009)
- The Infection by Chimaira (2009)
- "Wonderful Life (Arthur Baker Remixes)" by Hurts (2010): Side A has a portrait picture of band member Theo Hutchcraft and side B contains a portrait picture of Adam Anderson.
- The Final Frontier by Iron Maiden (2010): Double picture disc. Disc 1 contains album cover on disc 1, side one and silhouette of band on disc 2, side 1.
- "Bittersweet" 7-inch single by Sophie Ellis-Bextor (2010)
- So I Ate Myself, Bite by Bite by Dreamend (2010): Side A is designed to act as a phenakistoscope when used with the included die-cut sheet, along with a pint glass and light source.
- "Remedy" by The Black Crowes (2011): Side A is a live acoustic version of the song while side B is a live electric version. Special release with the band's album "Croweology" for Record Store Day.
- Th1rt3en by Megadeth (2011)
- Heritage (Opeth album) by Opeth (2011)
- We Are Young by Fun (2011)
- Lady Luck by Jamie Woon (2011)
- Trials of Imaginaerum by Nightwish (2012)
- National Anthem by Lana Del Rey (UK only, 2012)
- We Don't Even Live Here by P.O.S (2012)
- Kiss by Carly Rae Jepsen (2012)
- 13 by Suicidal Tendencies (2013)
- Blue Ash and Other Suburbs by Trey Anastasio (2013): Features outtakes from the Traveler sessions that were co-produced by Trey and Peter Katis in Fall, 2011 and Original artwork by Micah Lidberg.
- The Devil Put Dinosaurs Here by Alice In Chains (2013)
- Life on Mars? by David Bowie (2013)
- Bangerz by Miley Cyrus
- Art Support Machine by Electrosexual artwork by Dutch artist Lukas Julius Keijser and designed by Philip Marshall (2014)
- Pika Pika Fantajin by Kyary Pamyu Pamyu (2014)
- Vulnicura Live by Björk (2015)
- The Incredible True Story by Logic (2015)
- The Last Hero by Alter Bridge (2016)
- The Vengeful One by Disturbed (2016)
- Hesitant Alien by Gerard Way (2017)
- Makes Me Sick by New Found Glory (2017)
- Reputation by Taylor Swift (2017)
- Yellow Submarine by The Beatles (2018)
- Post-Apocalypto by Tenacious D (2018)
- Greatest Hits by Spice Girls was reissued with a picture disc which completes the cut out picture of the front cover (2019)
- Chromatica by Lady Gaga (2020)
- Los Prisioneros by Los Prisioneros (2020)
- Manzana by Los Prisioneros (2020)
- View-Monster by Lemon Demon (2020)
- Man on the Moon III: The Chosen by Kid Cudi (2020)
- No One Sings Like You Anymore a posthumous covers album by Chris Cornell (2020)
- Spirit Phone by Lemon Demon (2021)
- Fortitude official-store-only special edition by Gojira (2021)
- Marvin's Marvelous Mechanical Museum by Tally Hall (2021)
- Cracker Island by Gorillaz (2023) (Limited edition)
- Wannabe 25 by Spice Girls was reissued to commemorate the groups twenty-fifth anniversary. Similar to their 2019 reissue of Greatest Hits the sleeve is cut out with the B-side completing the front cover (2021)
- Virgin by Lorde (2025)
- West End Girl by Lily Allen (2026)
- Boundary by Kelly Yu (2026)
- Petal by Ariana Grande (2026)

== See also ==
- Unusual types of gramophone records
