= Patricia Day =

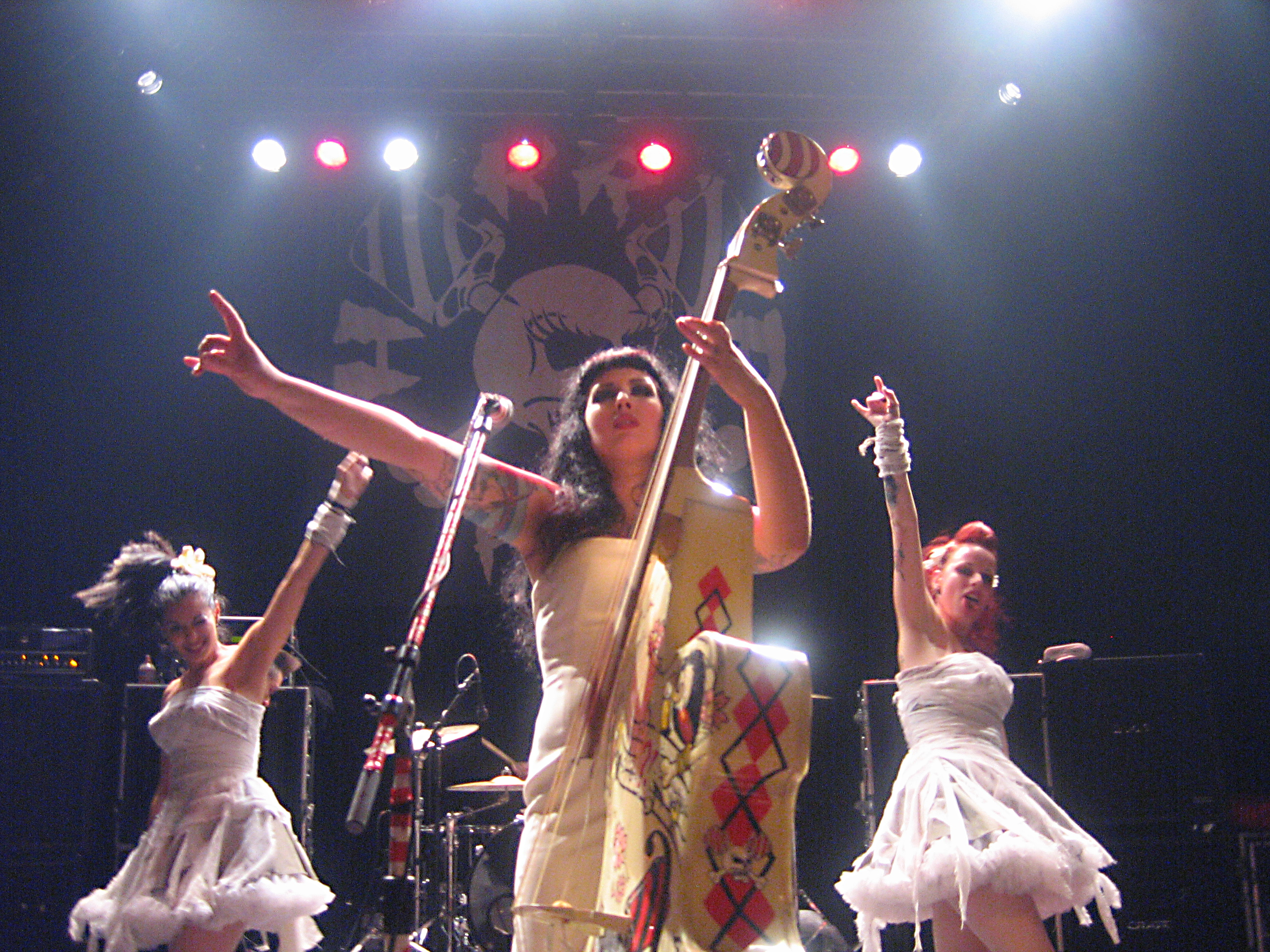
- Day performing with HorrorPops in Montreal, Canada, 2006

Background information
- Born: Copenhagen, Denmark
- Genres: Rockabilly; psychobilly
- Occupations: Singer; musician
- Instruments: Bass; vocals
- Member of: HorrorPops

Patricia Day is a Danish musician best known as the lead vocalist and bassist of the rockabilly and psychobilly band HorrorPops.

== Early life ==
Patricia Day was born in Copenhagen, Denmark.

== Career ==
=== Bands ===
Patricia Day began her musical career performing with the Danish punk rock band Peanut Pump Gun. She met Nekromantix singer and bassist, Kim Nekroman, at the 1996 POPKOMM festival in Cologne, Germany, when Peanut Pump Gun opened for his group. Despite both belonging to the subculture scene of Copenhagen, Denmark, the two had never met before, but they became friends over their mutual interest in alternative music and the two eventually married. The two both loved Blondie, Depeche Mode and Siouxsie and the Banshees, as well as Surf, Ska, and Punk.

=== Founding of Horrorpops ===
Day would later marry Nekroman. The two formed a band in 1996 called Horrorpops. Day is the lead singer and also plays upright bass. Day and Nekroman decided to form a band where they could experiment with many genres outside of their normal bands, and decided to start by switching instruments. Nekroman taught Day how to play an upright bass, while she taught him how to play guitar. The two began auditioning for a drummer, with Nekromantix guitarist Peter Sandorff even being a possible choice. They eventually chose Niedermeier to drum, a friend of Day's and a member of the band Strawberry Slaughterhouse, and officially started HorrorPops in 1998. After touring for a while as a trio, the band recruited Niedermeier's old bandmate, Caz the Clash, as a second guitarist.

=== 2000-2003: Demo tape and signing ===
In 2000, Day recruited two friends, Mille and Kamilla Vanilla, co-workers at the body piercing shop she worked at to act as go-go dancers for the band's live show. The group also recorded a 7-song demo for use in a press kit, but it was somehow leaked to the public, and resulted in two of the group's singles, "Ghouls" and "Psychobitches outta Hell" becoming club hits in Denmark. The group spent the next few years touring Europe, until 2003, when they began recording 6 more demo tracks. During this time, Caz the Clash became a father and left the band to focus on parenting. He was replaced by another Strawberry Slaughterhouse member, Karsten. Hellcat Records, Tim Armstrong's record label, decided to sign HorrorPops based on their demos. The band was able to release a vinyl single in September 2003, and began a U.S. headlining tour.

HorrorPops ventured out on their first US tour as headliner for the "Aloha from hell tour" with 9 shows across California and Arizona. This also brought the first US interview to HorrorPops which happened to be with Vogue. With the band always finding humor in things and wanting to please 'the moms', HorrorPops ended up with a trendy and very funny article in Vogue. Later same year the band got a great preview of their upcoming show with Rancid in LA weekly and a show with Rancid and Tiger Army at the Wiltern, LA. This show brought HorrorPops out to a lot of new people.

=== 2004: Hell Yeah ===
Hell Yeah! was released on 10 February 2004; the interest in the band grew and when they did their release show at Amoeba Records, it was packed, to the surprise of everyone in HorrorPops. HorrorPops was then supposed to follow up with a grand U.S. tour, but got stuck in immigration paperwork and had to cancel the whole tour. The Offspring was just about to head out on their month-long European tour, and with a three-day warning, HorrorPops got offered the chance to join them as main support. Horrorpops played every night for audiences numbering between 5,000 and 16,000 people, and then continued with their own 1 1/2-month headline tour in Europe. Shortly after the European tour ended, Horrorpops returned to the states to play Jimmy Kimmel Live and a few California shows. Mille left band to go back to school.

HorrorPops started touring the US, first on the Punks vs Psychos tour, then as main support for Lars Frederiksen and the Bastards and then back to Europe for another tour. The band toured continuously in 2004. The Horrorpops also played in a movie titled The Punk Rock Halocust. Later, Karsten left the band. HorrorPops played around 110 shows in 2004 and went back to Los Angeles to start work on their second album..

=== 2005-2008: Bring it On and Kiss Kiss Kill Kill ===
The band soon moved from Denmark to Los Angeles. The band's second album, Bring It On!, was released on 13 September 2005 and featured their new rhythm guitarist Geoff Kresge. The HorrorPops spent most of 2006 touring Canada, Asia, Europe, and the States, including a Warped Tour stint. Kresge left the group before the band's next album, bringing the group back to three members.

Their third album, released on 5 February 2008, is titled Kiss Kiss Kill Kill. The band began a North American tour around the time the album was released. They began the tour with an electric show in San Luis Obispo, where they have a fairly loyal following, and are currently touring with two bands from Los Angeles. Their opening bands include Rocket, an all-female band, and The Pink Spiders, a pop punk band. They are on Vans Warped Tour all summer. After the release of their third album, Kiss Kiss Kill Kill, their fan base increased.

== 'Barbie doll' controversy ==
On 23 December 2010, Day filed a lawsuit in an Indianapolis federal court against the Hard Rock casino, charging infringement of the right of publicity and false endorsement. In her lawsuit, the HorrorPops singer claims Hard Rock and Mattel have been selling a Barbie doll in her image without her authorization.

Mattel and Hard Rock have released a series of rock ‘n’ roll-themed Barbies, featuring pioneering female musicians such as Debbie Harry of Blondie, Joan Jett or Cyndi Lauper. In the lawsuit it is alleged that another doll, called the “Hard Rock Café Barbie Doll" or the “Rockabilly Barbie,” is made in the image of the HorrorPops lead singer but without direct acknowledgement of nor permission by Patricia Day.

== Playing style and gear ==
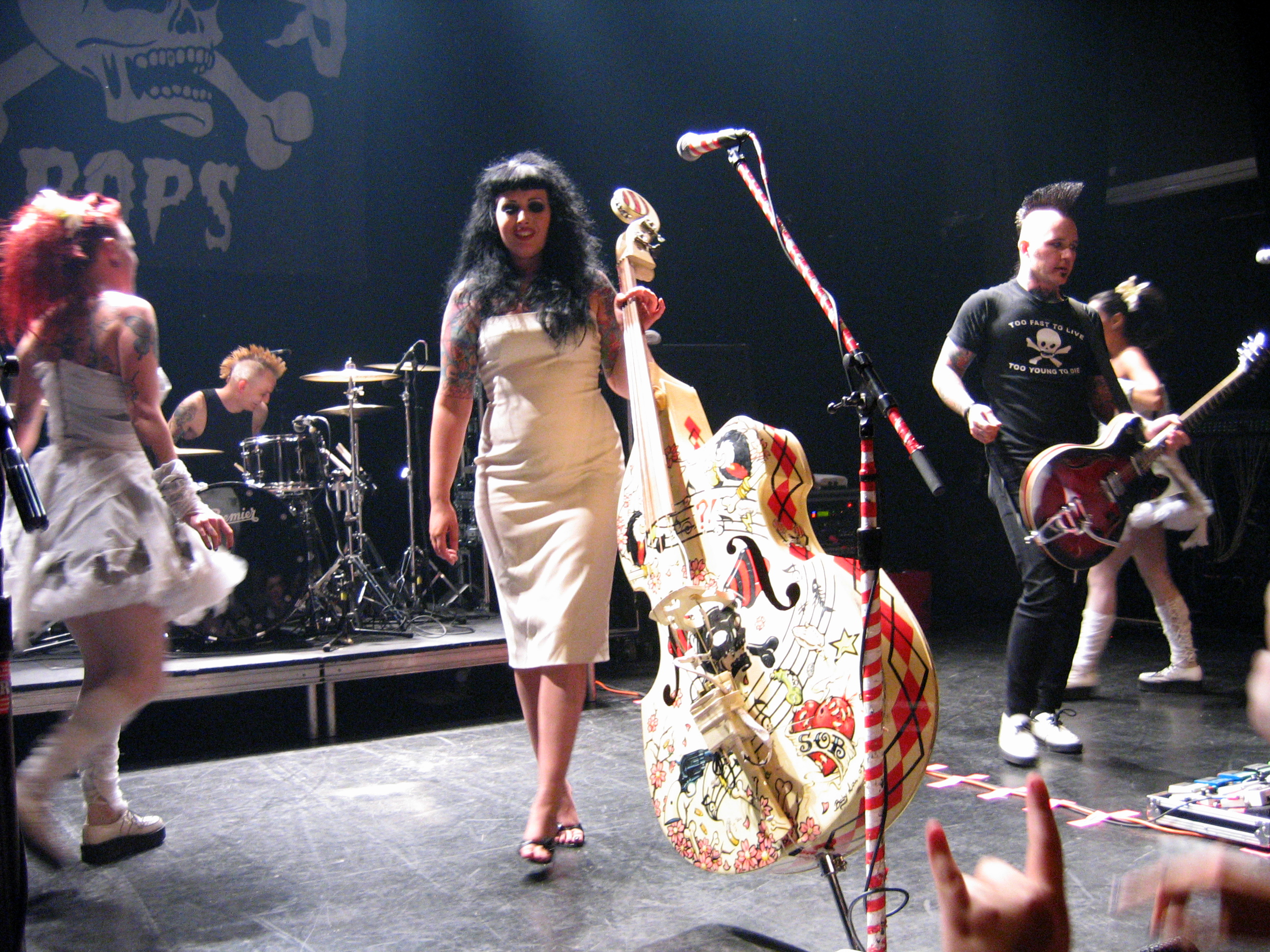
HorrorPops frontwoman Patricia Day plays an elaborately decorated upright bass, a common instrument in psychobilly.

On tour, Day plays custom-created upright basses made for her by Nekroman. These basses weigh approximately half of what a normal bass does, have thinner bodies, and slimmer necks because her hands are much smaller than the average upright bass player. The smaller instruments are also easier to transport on tour. Like many psychobilly upright bass players, Day plays with a "slap" style, slapping the strings against the fingerboard simultaneously with playing her bass lines to create a percussive, rhythmic effect. Many psychobilly and rockabilly bassists who slap use non-steel strings, as steel strings are too hard on the hands. Day uses nylon bass strings and a Gallien-Krueger 1001RB head and 4X10 cabs to push out her sound while on tour. Her trademark is her heavily decorated white double bass, hand-painted by tattoo artist Baby Lou Tattoo.

== Personal life ==
Day is married to her bandmate Kim Nekroman.

On 14 March 2022, it was announced on the band's Facebook page that Day was battling cancer and that a GoFundMe page was set up for people to donate money to help Day pay for her medical bills. "If we decide to do a comeback tour after a 9-year hiatus, a pandemic will shut all shows down and remove all means of income. And of course, as the pandemic dwindles and touring starts to be possible, cancer decides to pay me a visit. Well, F Murphy and his god damn law and F cancer. I’m planning US shows for late summer & fall and Europe tours for ‘23 & ‘24 … and I can’t wait!!!" Day said.
