= Interview disc =

In media terms, an interview disc is a recorded disc with spoken word recordings in an interview style format, with a specific person or group of people, as opposed to the usual music features. The source of the recording can vary.

== Description ==
Some of them feature recordings of a standard interview, others may feature recordings of a press conference, however these are still often referred to as an interview disc as they would feature questions and answers in the usual format, with the main difference only there would be more than one interviewer. In both instances, such discs seldom contain actual music.

The term Interview disc started referring to vinyl discs of such recordings but the term can also be used to refer to CDs of the same nature. Some of them are limited edition release. Some of them are released on lesser known record labels as a bootleg recording, these are usually not recorded in studio conditions and as a result are not always of good sound quality. One well known name for such labels is Baktabak. Permission for distribution is not legally required. As a result of this, interviewees tend to be advised to avoid negative remarks, especially about other parties.

== Distribution forms ==
Interview discs can often be distributed in many forms including picture disc, flexi disc and shaped compact disc, as well as other types of unusual appearances.
