= As If by Ghosts =

Studio album by Dreamend
- Released: August 2004
- Genre: Shoegazing
- Length: 45:16
- Label: Graveface Records
- Producer: John Byler

Dreamend chronology
Preface (2002)	As If by Ghosts (2004)	Maybe We're Making God Sad and Lonely (2005)

As If by Ghosts is an album by shoegazing band Dreamend.

== Track listing ==
1. "Of Ravens and Winds" – 5:26
2. "Ellipsis" – 3:06
3. "Four Days in May" – 3:56
4. "The Almighty" – 4:46
5. "Murmur" – 4:51
6. "Can't Take You" – 4:03
7. "Slide Song" – 3:41
8. "The Old House and Its Occupants" – 5:14
9. "10 Guitars From Salem" – 3:50
10. "Passing" – 6:23
