= DVD card =

DVD with the size and shape of a business card

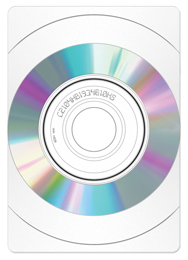

A DVD card, also called Business Card DVD, is a DVD with the size and shape of a business card. Much like a traditional DVD, is an optical based media whose primary function is DVD-video playback and data storage. In the mid-late 2000s, the DVD card format has been used in the retail market to distribute sports and entertainment titles. However, leveraging its affinity with business, loyalty and payment cards, the DVD Card has also been used for promotional and marketing purposes.

A DVD card contains data accessible by a computer, DVD player, PlayStation, Xbox, and most other devices that have the ability to read digital video disc (DVD) technology. Content on the card may range from movies and music to interactive games. When used in a computer, the software on the card may connect to the Internet and drive traffic to web sites or pull information from online databases.

== The seating device ==
DVD cards are both Windows and Macintosh compatible, but can only be played in a computer with a DVD-ROM tray or drawer. DVD cards may also be played in standard DVD players. The cards play in these machines by utilizing a seating device on the data side. There are two dominant seating devices currently used by DVD card manufacturers, the Plateau and the Ridge.

== History ==
DVD cards first appeared in 2004 when Serious USA, Inc. released a 10 card set of Manchester United DVD Cards. Each card featured a specific player and carried video highlights from that player's previous season. Each subsequent year through 2007, Serious USA, Inc. released a new set of Manchester United DVD cards. Various promotional DVD Cards have been used in direct mail, magazines, VIP passes, and event giveaways to promote various products and services.

== Innovations ==
Since 2004, the DVD card has undergone a significant innovation and has appeared in retailers such as Circuit City and Best Buy as a DVD Gift Card. As opposed to traditional DVD technology, the DVD Gift Card is less than 1 mm thick and carries a magnetic stripe used to activate and redeem the Card's value. The Card is the same size as a credit card, 85 mm × 54 mm, and carries up to 160 MB of digital content.

In December 2004, Interactive Card Solutions, now iActivecard LLC, was formed to exclusively create and set the standards for the interactive gift card market. The founders, Cory Perkins and Casey Archer, which helped create the Best Buy / Disney gift card, pursued a strategy to create a series of DVD gift cards first with additional applications as:

1. Insurance Cards
2. Coupon Cards
3. Hotel Room Keys
4. Loyalty Cards
5. Frequent Flier Cards
6. Payroll Cards and more

The interactive gift card is the result of years of proprietary development and combines separate industries including Optical Media Manufacturing, Card Personalization, Interactive Marketing and Software Development. Several patents protecting the iActivecard include U.S. patents #6,597,653, #6,484,940, #7,080,783, #6,747,930 B1, 7,308,696 B2, #6,510,124 B1, and #6,762,988. iActivecard LLC has developed a contactless interactive transaction card which combines RFID technology embedded in a DVD as another alternative to a plastic card.

Another participant in the interactive gift card, Serious USA, Inc., filed for bankruptcy on October 9, 2009. A May 22, 2008 lawsuit vs. Interactive Cards Solutions was dismissed with prejudice on December 18, 2008(4). Iactivecard LLC licensed nine Serious USA, Inc. patents in January 2009 prior to Serious' bankruptcy filing.

== Shape, size and capacity ==
There are two shapes:

- Rectangular. This DVD card is called rectangle DVD.

The capacity is variable, related to the shape and the changeable size:

- The rectangular Business Card DVD can have a capacity of 330 MB on a size of 85 mm x 58 mm or of 86mm x 61mm. It can also own 570 MB on 85 mm x 64 mm.
- The oval DVD card can have 330 MB on 80 mm x 61 mm. It can also own 335 MB on 80 mm x 60 mm. Besides, it may have 620 MB on 80 mm x 66 mm.

== See also ==
- Bootable business card
- Shaped compact disc
- DVD Formats
- MiniDVD
- Stored value card
- Magnetic stripe card
