= Maybe We're Making God Sad and Lonely =

Studio album by Dreamend
- Released: July 14, 2005
- Genre: Shoegazing, Post-rock
- Length: 35:01
- Label: Graveface Records GRAVE014

Dreamend chronology
As If by Ghosts (2004)	Maybe We're Making God Sad and Lonely (2005)	The Long Forgotten Friend (2008)

Maybe We're Making God Sad and Lonely is the second full length by Dreamend, a Chicago-based band.

== Track listing ==
The album consists of 6 songs:

1. "A Place in Thy Memory" – 8:47
2. "In Her Little Bed We Lay Her" – 5:02
3. "Can't Take You {Dif}" – 4:10
4. "Iceland" – 5:21
5. "Mary Cogswell & Fred Vaillancourt" – 1:39
6. "New Zealand" – 10:02
