= Kiss Kiss Kill Kill =

Studio album by Horrorpops
- Released: 2008
- Recorded: Sound City Studios and HELL!, CA
- Genre: Punk rock, new wave, rockabilly, psychobilly
- Length: 40:38
- Label: Hellcat Records
- Producer: HorrorPops

Horrorpops chronology
Bring It On! (2005)	Kiss Kiss Kill Kill (2008)

Professional ratings
Review scores
Source	Rating
Allmusic	4/5 stars

Kiss Kiss Kill Kill is the third album by the Danish punk trio HorrorPops. The cover and songs convey a cinematic theme (particularly those with repressed female protagonists and escapist themes, the obvious example being the track "Thelma and Louise"). The album art mimics archetypical B-movie posters, promising "Twelve Tales About Love and Murder... Starring HorrorPops". Only "Boot to Boot" doesn't conform to the film formula. Inspired by the rioting in Copenhagen that followed the destruction of the Ungdomshuset (Youth House), an anarcho-punk squat and self-managed social centre, by police forces in 2007. Of the album's sound, lead singer Patricia Day stated in the Hellcat review of the album that the band was started "So that we could play all kinds of music [but]... We really wanted to get back to the classic new wave feel that we love. And I think our excitement about these songs has made a hell of difference."

== Track listing ==
1. "Thelma and Louise" – 3:17
2. "MissFit" – 2:58
3. "Boot2Boot" – 3:13
4. "Heading for the Disco?" – 2:46
5. "Kiss Kiss Kill Kill" – 3:55
6. "Everything's Everything" – 4:08
7. "Hitchcock Starlet" – 3:24
8. "Highway 55" – 3:38
9. "HorroBeach Pt.II" – 3:08
10. "Copenhage Refugee" – 3:29
11. "Keep My Picture!" – 3:36
12. "Private Hall of Shame" – 2:55
