= Shaped compact disc =

Special variety of compact discs

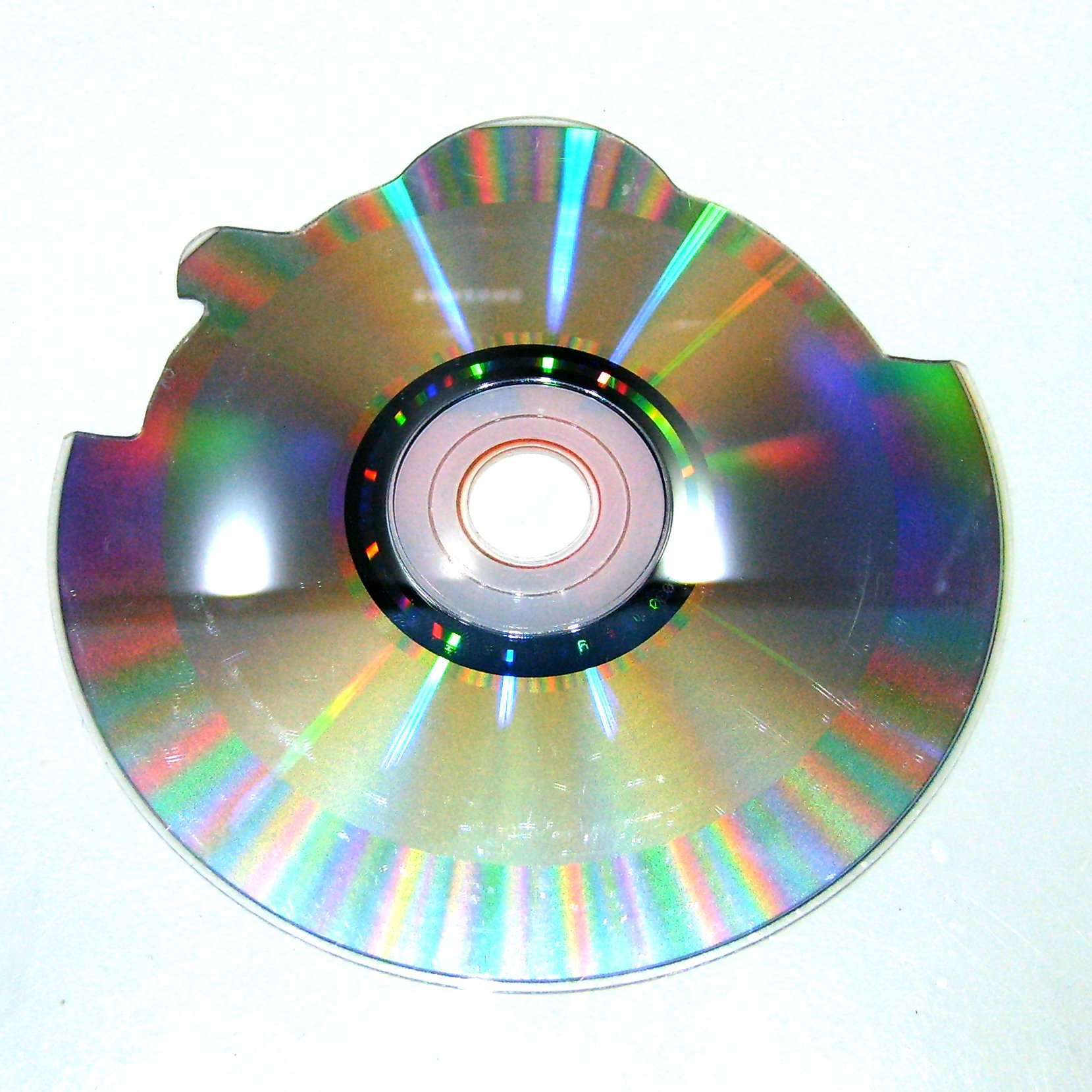
Picture of the back of a shaped CD. This CD was produced as a round disc and automatically cut to shape using a computer-aided machine with a rotary tool. It is easy to distinguish that the data track of the disc is smaller compared to a full 72-minute disc; it ends before it reaches the outside border of the disc to allow the unused media on the outside to be cut away.

A shaped compact disc (known as a shaped CD) is a non-circular compact disc. Examples include business card CDs, CDs in the shape of a star, a map of a country, interview material and more. These discs are usually made for marketing purposes and are properly read by most CD-ROM drives (and audio CD players, although custom-shaped CDs tend to contain less data). Many companies sell CDs with custom shapes.

Unlike Mini CDs, which are smaller, but still circular versions of normal CDs, custom CDs can be any number of shapes, even more complicated shapes like gears with dozens of teeth, but are generally smooth and with rounded edges, such as ovals or rounded rectangles. A logo can be printed on a shaped CD, in the same way common audio CDs and CD-ROMs are labeled.

Shaped CDs are produced in one of two ways. A special mold can be made and used to "stamp" CDs (or DVDs) as part of the precision injection molding process that is used to make CDs and DVDs. Because of the initial cost involved in setting up this process, it is usually used for mass production. For the same reason, this is generally restricted to the production of read-only CDs and DVDs (CD-ROM or DVD-ROM). Recordable CDs and DVDs (CD-R or DVD-R or DVD+R) are not generally available except in standard shapes including rectangular. The second method to produce a shaped CD or DVD is to produce a normal CD-ROM or DVD-ROM and cut it to the desired shape. This method works only for CD-ROMs. It will not work for CD-R because the plastic used to produce CD-R tends to splinter when cut. It is important that two criteria be met for a shaped disc to function properly. First, the shape must be balanced to avoid problems when it begins to spin. Second, at least three points of the outer edge must touch either the outer 12 cm diameter rim of the player's tray where standard size discs fit or the inner rim where 8 cm diameter mini discs fit.

Data can only be recorded on sections of a shaped CD that form uninterrupted circular tracks. Other parts of the shape are purely decorative - but are still often finished to the same appearance as a CD. They appear silver and reflective on the data side of the CD, even though they contain no actual valid bytes and cannot be read.

== History ==
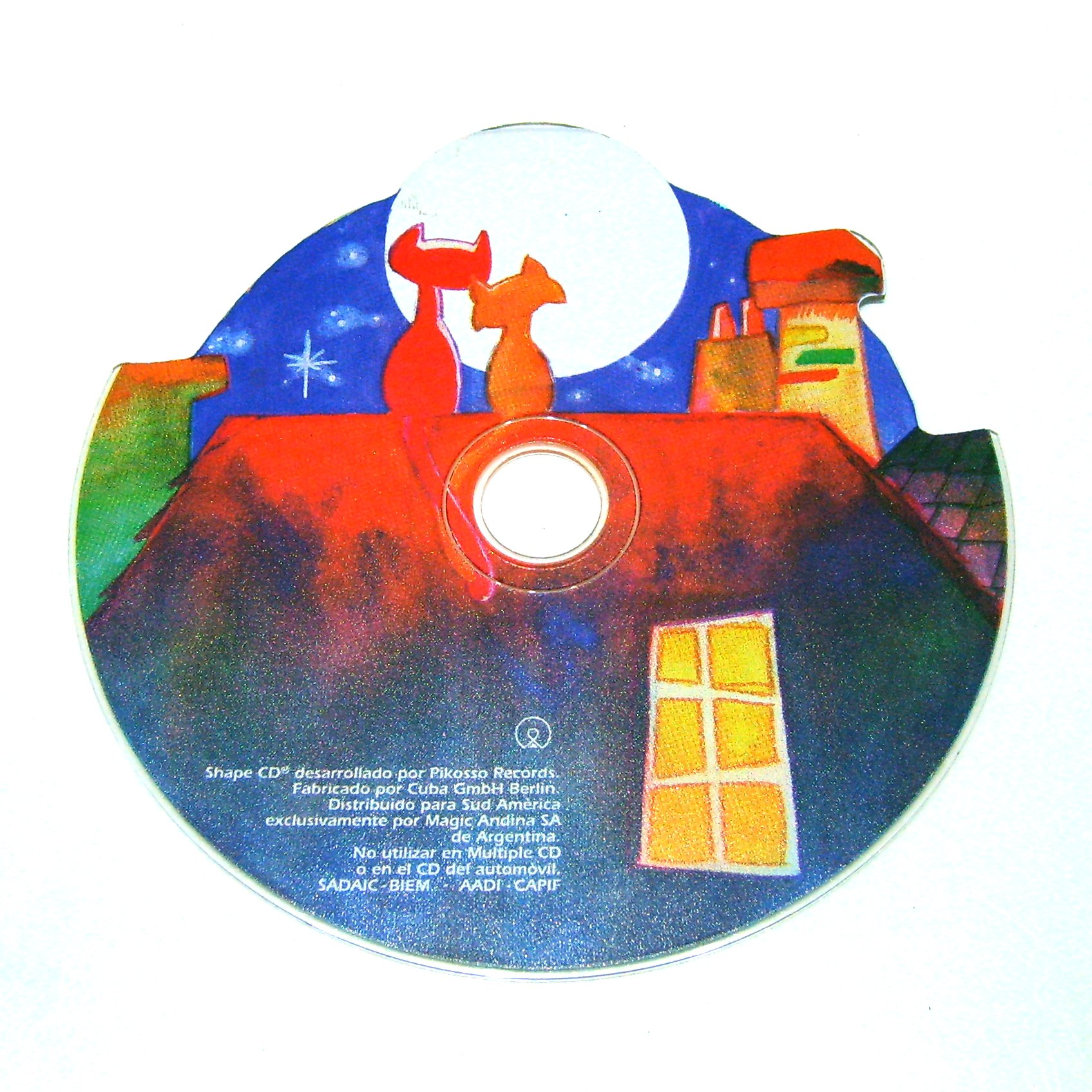
An example of a shaped disc

The first square CD featured four arrangements of the Doctor Who theme tune. The Flaming Lips released a CD single for the song "This Here Giraffe" on a disc in the shape of an 8-pointed star. The North American releases of the soundtracks to certain Nintendo 64 games also received shaped CDs. The CD soundtrack to the 1997 game Yoshi's Story, an album called Music to Pound the Ground To, came in an asymmetrical shape outlining Yoshi's face and some fruits in the background; similarly, the CD soundtrack to the 1997 game Diddy Kong Racing came in an asymmetrical shape outlining Diddy Kong's head.

An additional example is the 2002 live EP Alive in Torment, released by symphonic black metal band Dimmu Borgir. The disc is shaped like a skull. British death metal band Carcass also released a limited edition of their 1996 album Swansong as a CD shaped like a brain.

== Compatibility ==
Shaped CDs are not compatible with all CD players. They work with most machines where the disc is inserted by manually clipping it onto a spindle (the mechanism in virtually all portable CD players), but may not work in drives that load the disc from a tray, and they are not compatible with any slot-loading drives. They can even get stuck in these players, or be rejected if the tray-loading mechanism has optical sensors to detect the disc position.

Business card CDs or shaped CDs can hold any type of data and can usually store anywhere from 40MB to 100MB of information. These CDs may be used for promotional pieces for business, music or many other uses.

== Asymmetric discs ==
Irregularly shaped, non-rotationally symmetric discs with an offset center of mass may also cause damaging vibration if played in computer CD drives, which can operate at a much higher rotational velocity than stand-alone audio CD players. Some irregularly shaped discs work with tray-loading CD drives if they include a circular ridge on their underside that centers them on the part of the tray designed to hold 80 mm CDs, if the tray has such a feature.

== Legal/patent ==
A patent exists on the production of all non-round CDs. Often referred to as the "Rose Patent," its holder David H. Rose litigated to collect royalties on the production or sale of any non-round disc. Other manufacturers of non-round discs litigated to dispute the validity of this patent and produced examples of non-round discs that predate the patent. The matter continued to be in litigation as of November 2009. Observation of the aforementioned patent has determined that it is only in regard to magnetic media and further citations may be needed to verify its application to CD optical media. The patent expired on 18 October 2015.

== See also ==
- Bootable business card
- Unusual types of gramophone records § Unusually shaped discs
