= Dreamend =

US musical group

Dreamend is an American, Savannah-based shoegazer musical group signed to Graveface Records, whose music is characterized by textured guitar work and prominent drums and percussion. Song styles range from post-rock to bluegrass. The group has been compared to groups such as Mono and Explosions in the Sky.

Dreamend is the main musical output of Ryan Graveface (real name, Ryan Manon), Graveface Records' owner/sole employee. He also contributes musically in the psychedelic band Black Moth Super Rainbow (BMSR), the Halloween band The Marshmallow Ghosts & The Casket Girls. Since its inception in 2002, Graveface has released albums by Monster Movie, The Loose Salute, Kid Dakota, Appleseed Cast, Whirr, Mount Eerie, BMSR and many more.

== Discography ==
- The Sickening Pang of Hope Deferred (2000)
- Dreamend (EP, 2001)
- Stigmata Boy (EP, 2001)
- Preface (Split EP with Monster Movie, 2002)
- As If by Ghosts (2004)
- Maybe We're Making God Sad and Lonely (2005)
- The Long Forgotten Friend (2008)
- So I Ate Myself, Bite By Bite (2010)
- And the Tears Washed Me, Wave After Cowardly Wave (2012)
- Dreamend (2018)
