= So I Ate Myself, Bite by Bite =

Studio album by Dreamend
- Released: August 10, 2010
- Genres: Shoegazing, lo-fi, psychedelic folk
- Length: 41:16
- Label: Graveface Records

Dreamend chronology
The Long Forgotten Friend (2008)	So I Ate Myself, Bite by Bite (2010)	And the Tears Washed Me, Wave After Cowardly Wave (2011)

Professional ratings
Review scores
Source	Rating
Allmusic	3.5/5 stars
Tiny Mix Tapes	4/5 stars
Drowned In Sound	(8/10)

So I Ate Myself, Bite by Bite is the fourth full-length by Dreamend, a Chicago-based band. It is a companion piece to Dreamend's album, And the Tears Washed Me, Wave After Cowardly Wave.

== Track listing ==
1. "Pink Cloud In The Woods" – 6:22
2. "Where You Belong" – 3:11
3. "Magnesium Light" – 3:02
4. "Interlude" – 2:10
5. "Repent" – 2:46
6. "A Thought" – 2:52
7. "Pieces" – 3:53
8. "My Old Brittle Bones" – 3:53
9. "Aching Silence" – 3:02
10. "An Admission" – 10:05
