= Bring It On! (HorrorPops album) =

Bring it On!

Studio album by HorrorPops
- Released: September 13, 2005
- Recorded: 2005 at: Sound City Studios, CA
- Genres: Psychobilly; Punk rock Rockabilly
- Label: Hellcat Records
- Producer: Brett Gurewitz

HorrorPops chronology
Hell Yeah! (2004)	Bring it On! (2005)	Kiss Kiss Kill Kill (2008)

Professional ratings
Review scores
Source	Rating
Allmusic	link
PopMatters	link

Bring it On! is the second album by the Danish psychobilly band, HorrorPops. It was released on September 13, 2005 on Hellcat Records. It was recorded in Sound City Studios, Van Nuys, California during 2005. It was produced by Brett Gurewitz.

== Track listing ==
All tracks by Day, Gaarde, Kresge & Stendahl

1. "Freaks in Uniforms" – 2:45
2. "Hit 'n Run" – 3:34
3. "Bring It On!" – 2:17
4. "It's Been So Long" – 3:27
5. "Undefeated" – 2:52
6. "You vs. Me" – 4:00
7. "Crawl Straight Home" – 2:50
8. "Trapped" – 3:19
9. "Walk Like a Zombie" – 4:07
10. "Where You Can't Follow" – 3:05
11. "Caught in a Blonde" – 2:58
12. "S.O.B" – 3:25
13. "Who's Leading You Now" – 2:50

== Personnel ==
- Octavio Arizala – Photography
- Tom Baker – Mastering
- Patricia Day – Chant
- Greg Gordon – Engineer
- Brett Gurewitz – Background Vocals, Producer, Mixing
- Geoff Kresge – Guitar, Group Member
- Pete Martinez – Engineer
- Kim Nekroman – Guitar, Graphic Design, Layout Design, Group Member
- Nonô – Chant
- Joshua Douglas Smith – Assistant Engineer
- Henrik "Niedermeier" Stendahl - Drums
