= HorrorPops =

Danish punk band

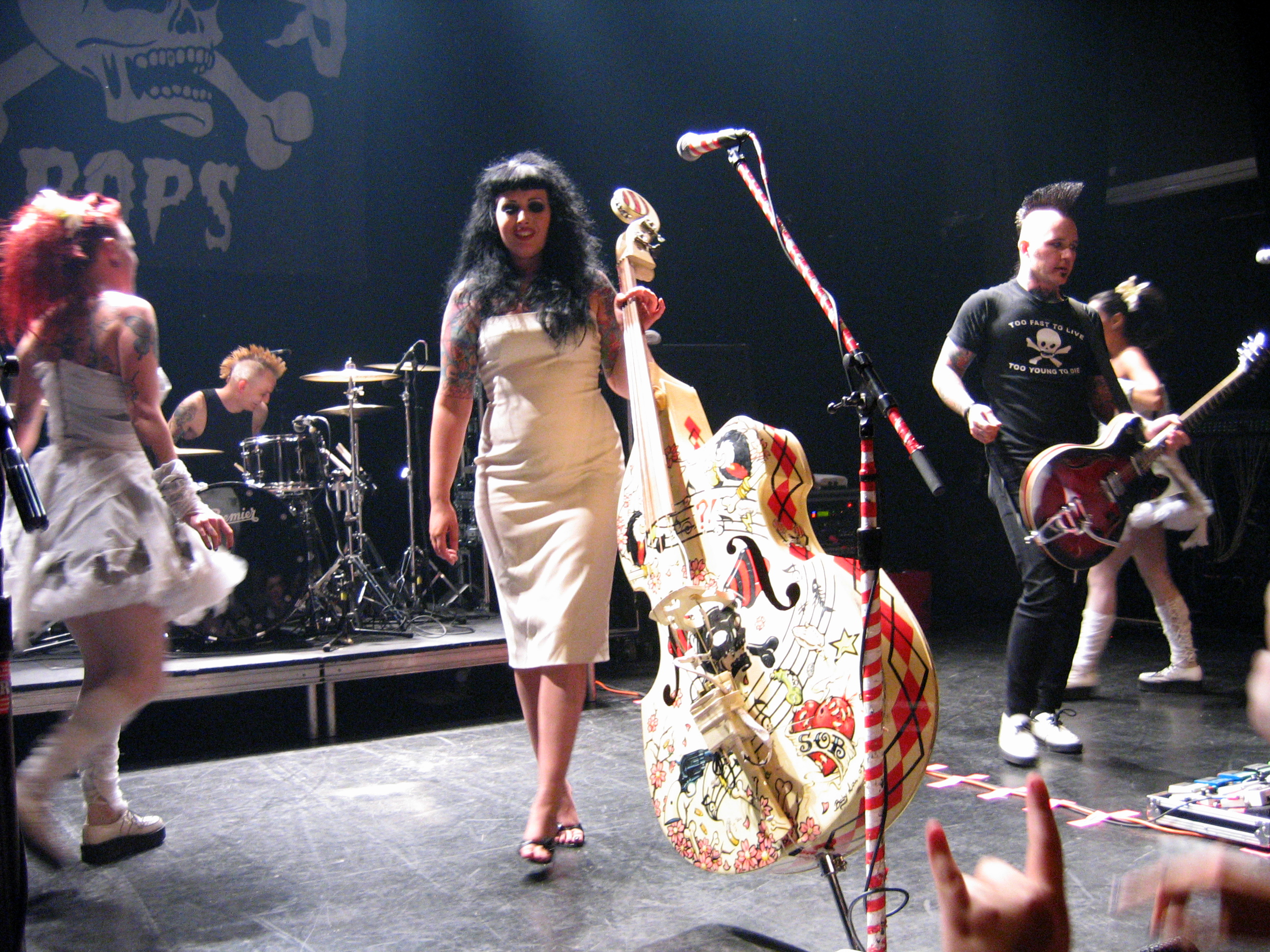
- HorrorPops performing in Montreal, 2006

Background information
- Origin: Copenhagen, Denmark
- Genres: Psychobilly; punk rock
- Years active: 1996–present
- Labels: Hellcat; Epitaph
- Members: Patricia Day; Kim Nekroman; Henrik "Niedermeier" Stendahl
- Past members: Casper "Caz The Clash" Holbek; Karsten Johnasen; Geoff Kresge

HorrorPops are a Danish punk band that formed in 1996. The band's sound is rooted in psychobilly, rockabilly, and punk rock.

== History ==
=== 1996–1999: Formation ===
Band founders Patricia Day and Kim Nekroman first met when Day's now-defunct band, the punk rock group Peanut Pump Gun, opened for Nekroman's psychobilly band, Nekromantix, at the POPKOM festival in Cologne, Germany in 1996. Despite both belonging to the subculture scene of Copenhagen, Denmark, the two had never met before, but they became friends over their mutual interest in alternative music.

=== 2000–2003: Demo tape and signing ===
In 2000, Day recruited two friends, Mille and Kamilla Vanilla, co-workers at the body piercing shop she worked at to act as go-go dancers for the band's live show. The group also recorded a 7-song demo for use in a press kit, but it was somehow leaked to the public, and resulted in two of the group's singles, "Ghouls" and "Psychobitches outta Hell" becoming club hits in Denmark. The group spent the next few years touring Europe until 2003. During this time, Caz the Clash became a father and left the band to focus on parenting. He was replaced by another Strawberry Slaughterhouse member, Karsten. Hellcat Records, Tim Armstrong's record label, signed HorrorPops. The band released a vinyl single in September 2003, and began a U.S. headlining tour.

HorrorPops ventured out on their first US tour as headliner for the "Aloha from hell tour" with nine shows across California and Arizona. They were interviewed by Vogue, and reviewed by LA Weekly.

=== 2004: Hell Yeah ===
Hell Yeah! was released February 10, 2004; the interest in the band grew and when they did their release show at Amoeba Records, it was packed, to the surprise of everyone in HorrorPops. HorrorPops was then supposed to follow up with a grand U.S. tour, but got stuck in immigration paperwork and had to cancel the whole tour. The Offspring was just about to head out on their month-long European tour and with a three-day warning HorrorPops got offered the chance to join them as main support. Horrorpops played every night for audiences numbering between 5000 and 16000 people, and then continued with their own 1 1/2-month headline tour in Europe. Shortly after the European tour ended, Horrorpops returned to the states to play Jimmy Kimmel Live and a few California shows, but realizing the work that lay ahead and how time-consuming the band had become, Mille had to leave the band to go back to school. Mille got replaced by another good friend of the band, Naomi, who was quickly renamed NoNo. HorrorPops started touring the states, first on Punks VS Psychos, then as main support for Lars Frederiksen and the Bastards and then back to Europe for another tour. The band toured continuously in 2004 and the band enjoyed it. The Horrorpops also played in a movie called Punk Rock Holocaust and therefore made them more popular. Later, Karsten had to leave the band; he met the love of his life and wanted to spend time with her which was hard to do with the band's tour schedule. HorrorPops played around 110 shows in 2004 and went back to Los Angeles to start work on their second album. They played one last show for the year in West Hollywood to announce their new guitar player.

=== 2005–2008: Bring it On and Kiss Kiss Kill Kill ===
The band soon relocated from Denmark to Los Angeles, California. The band's second album, Bring It On!, was released on September 13, 2005, and featured their new rhythm guitarist, Geoff Kresge. The HorrorPops spent most of 2006 touring Canada, Asia, Europe, and the States, including a Warped Tour stint. Kresge left the group before the band's next album, bringing the group back to three members.

Their third album, released on February 5, 2008, is called Kiss Kiss Kill Kill. The band began a North American tour around the time the album was released. They began the tour with an electric show in San Luis Obispo, CA, USA where they have a fairly loyal following, and are currently touring with two bands from Los Angeles, CA. Their opening bands include Rocket, which is an all-female band, and The Pink Spiders, a pop punk band. They are on Vans Warped Tour all summer. After the release of Kiss Kiss Kill Kill they began to have a much larger fan base.

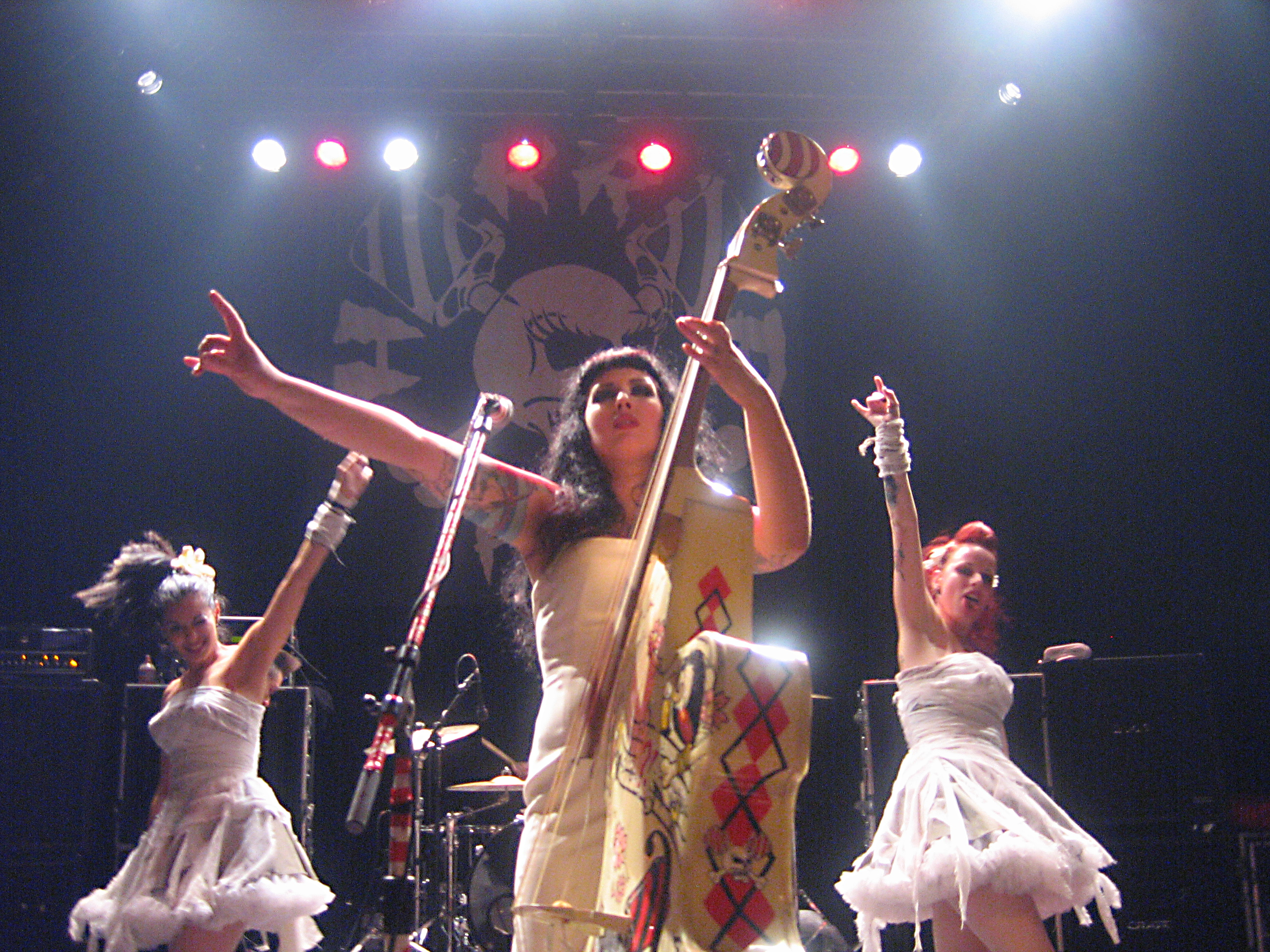
The HorrorPops performing in Montreal in 2006.

== 'Barbie doll' controversy ==
On 23 December 2010, Patricia Day filed a lawsuit in an Indianapolis federal court against the Hard Rock casino, charging infringement of the right of publicity and false endorsement. In her lawsuit, the HorrorPops singer claimed Hard Rock and Mattel had been selling a Barbie doll in her image without her authorization.

Mattel and Hard Rock have released a series of rock ‘n’ roll-themed Barbies, featuring pioneering female musicians such as Debbie Harry of Blondie, Joan Jett or Cyndi Lauper. In the lawsuit it is alleged that another doll, called the “Hard Rock Café Barbie Doll" or the “Rockabilly Barbie,” is made in the image of the HorrorPops lead singer but without direct acknowledgement of nor permission by Patricia Day.

== Patricia Day's cancer battle ==
On 14 March 2022, it was announced on the band's Facebook page that Day was battling cancer and that a GoFundMe page was set up for people to donate money to help Day pay for her medical bills. "If we decide to do a comeback tour after a 9-year hiatus, a pandemic will shut all shows down and remove all means of income. And of course, as the pandemic dwindles and touring starts to be possible, cancer decides to pay me a visit. Well, F Murphy and his god damn law and F cancer. I’m planning US shows for late summer & fall and Europe tours for ‘23 & ‘24 … and I can’t wait!!!" Day said.

== Band members ==
=== Current lineup ===
- Patricia Day – double bass, vocals
- Kim Nekroman – semi-acoustic guitar
- Henrik "Niedermeier" Stendahl – drums

=== Former members ===
- Casper "Caz The Clash" Holbek – rhythm guitar (1998–2003)
- Karsten Johansen – rhythm guitar (2003–2004)
- Geoff Kresge – rhythm guitar (2005–2006)
- Sam Soto - rhythm guitar (2007-2008)

== Discography ==
=== Studio albums ===
Title	Release date	Label
Hell Yeah!	February 10, 2004	Hellcat/Epitaph
Bring It On!	September 9, 2005	Hellcat/Epitaph
Kiss Kiss Kill Kill	February 5, 2008	Hellcat/Epitaph

=== EPs and singles ===
Title	Release date	Label	Additional information
Ghouls/Psychobitches Outta Hell	September 2003	Rancid Records	
MissTake (CD single)		Hellcat/Epitaph Europe	
MissTake (picture disc)		Hellcat/Epitaph Europe	Picturedisc Limited to 500 copies and 500 signed copies under pressing. Only sold on Tour

=== Music videos ===
Year	Title	Director	Album
2004	Ghouls	Unknown Director	Hell Yeah!
2004	Miss Take	Justin Purser	Hell Yeah!
2005	Where You Can't Follow	Matt Heckerling	Bring It On!
2008	Heading for the Disco?	Octavio Winkytiki	Kiss Kiss Kill Kill
2008	Boot To Boot	Unknown Director	Kiss Kiss Kill Kill
2008	Horrorbeach Pt. 2	Octavio Winkytiki	Kiss Kiss Kill Kill

== See also ==
- List of psychobilly bands
