= Hell Yeah! (HorrorPops album) =

Studio album by HorrorPops
- Released: February 10, 2004
- Recorded: 1999 and 2003 at: Christiania's Ventura Recordings
- Genre: Psychobilly; Punk rock Rockabilly
- Length: 40:10
- Label: Hellcat Records
- Producer: Horrorpops

HorrorPops chronology
Hell Yeah! (2004)	Bring It On! (2005)

Professional ratings
Review scores
Source	Rating
Allmusic	link

Hell Yeah! is the debut album of Danish psychobilly band HorrorPops, released February 10, 2004.

The first seven tracks of the album were recorded in 1999 at Ventura Recordings. This was intended as a press kit only demo, however it was somehow copied and circulated leading to the tracks "Ghouls" and "Psychobitches Outta Hell" becoming a hit on the Copenhagen club circuit. The further six tracks making up the album were not recorded until 2003, again at Ventura Recordings. It was these 13 tracks that impressed Hellcat Records to the point of signing the band.

== Track listing ==
1. "Julia" (Day/Gaarde) – 2:45
2. "Drama Queen" (Day) – 2:22
3. "Ghouls" (Day) – 2:06
4. "Girl in a Cage" (Day/Gaarde) – 2:58
5. "Miss Take" (Day/Gaarde) – 3:58
6. "Where They Wander" (Day/Gaarde) – 3:00
7. "Kool Flattop" (Day/Gaarde/Tillander/Sylvest) – 3:09
8. "Psychobitches Outta Hell" (Day/Gaarde) – 3:12
9. "Dotted With Hearts" (Day/Gaarde) – 3:53
10. "Baby Lou Tattoo" (Day) – 3:11
11. "What's Under My Bed" (Day) – 3:15
12. "Emotional Abuse" (Day/Gaarde) – 3:21
13. "Horrorbeach" – 2:52
