= List of Reel Big Fish members =

Members of the American ska punk band

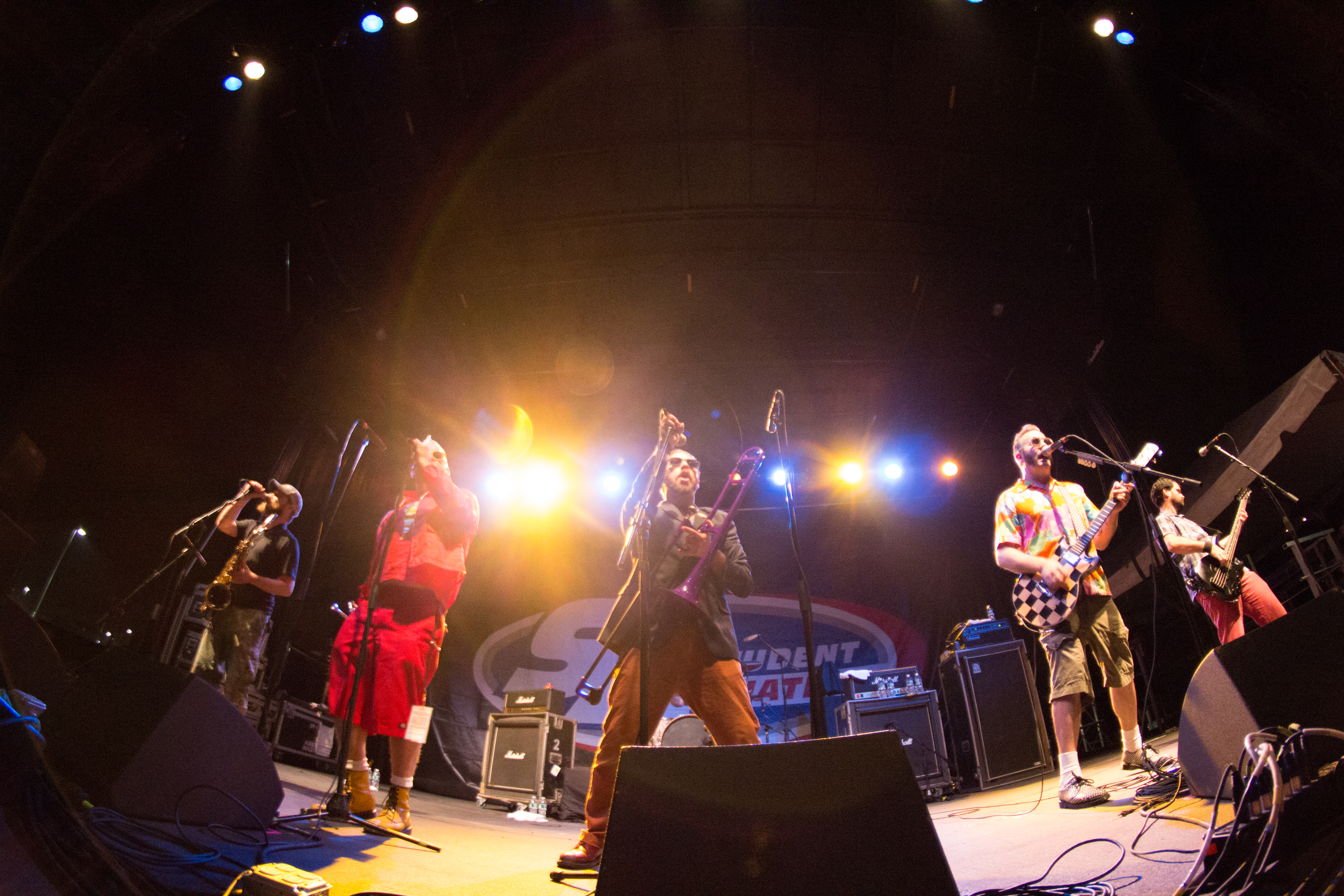
Reel Big Fish performing in 2013.

Reel Big Fish is an American ska punk band from Los Alamitos, California. Formed in December 1991, the group originally consisted of vocalist Ben Guzman, guitarists Aaron Barrett and Lisa Smith, bassist Matt Wong, keyboardist Zach Gilltrap and drummer Andrew Gonzales. The group's current lineup features Barrett, who took over as lead vocalist in 1993, alongside trombonist Dan Regan (who first joined in 1994 and returned in 2024), vocalist/trumpeter/guitarist Scott Klopfenstein (1995-2011, 2026-) trumpeter John Christianson (since 2004), bassist Derek Gibbs (since 2007), saxophonist Matt Appleton (since 2011) and drummer Ed "Smokey Beach" Larsen (since 2014).

== History ==
Reel Big Fish was formed as a hard rock outfit in December 1991. The original lineup featured Ben Guzman, Aaron Barrett, Lisa Smith, Matt Wong, Zach Gilltrap and Andrew Gonzales, who released the band's first self-titled demo tape (known as In the Good Old Days...) in 1992. By the following year, Barrett had taken over on lead vocals and decided to pursue a ska direction for the group, which was now a three-piece comprising himself, Wong and Gonzales. For their second self-titled demo (known as Return of the Mullet), the trio employed the services of trumpeter Eric Vismantas and saxophonist Stephan Reed.

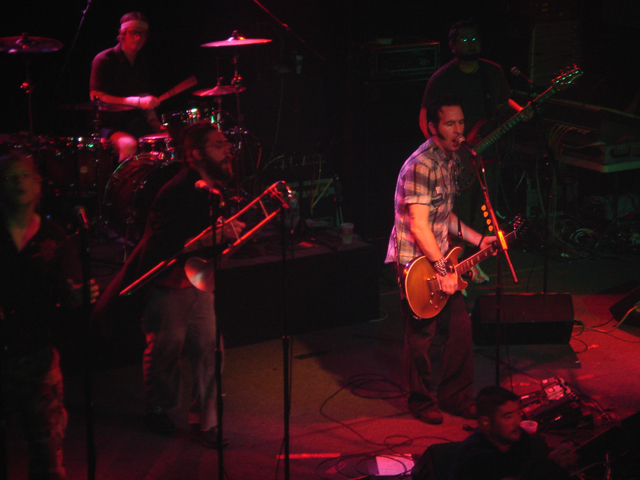
The band went through several lineup changes during the late 1990s and early to mid-2000s.

By 1994, the band had added Tavis Werts on trumpet, Dan Regan on trombone and Adam Polakoff on saxophone, who released Buy This! that year. By the time the group recorded its debut full-length album Everything Sucks, Robert Quimby had joined as a second trombonist. Quimby and Polakoff left before Turn the Radio Off, on which second trumpeter Scott Klopfenstein and new trombonist Grant Barry debuted. During the tour in promotion of 1998's Why Do They Rock So Hard?, Gonzales left in February 1999 to "pursue other interests and spend more time at home". He was followed the next month by Barry, who was dismissed for "personal differences".

With new drummer Carlos de la Garza, Reel Big Fish recorded much of Cheer Up! during 2000, before Werts quit in October 2001 and recording was completed by Tyler Jones, who took over his position the next month. In the summer of 2003, de la Garza was replaced by Justin Ferreira, a bandmate of Barrett's in the Forces of Evil. Another member of the Forces of Evil, trumpeter John Christianson, replaced Jones following his departure in September 2004. In 2005 the band released We're Not Happy 'til You're Not Happy, before Ferreira left in early 2005 and was replaced by Ryland Steen. Monkeys for Nothin' and the Chimps for Free followed in July 2007.

In June 2007, founding member Matt Wong announced his departure from the band in order to "settle down and be a family man"; he was replaced by the Forces of Evil bassist Derek Gibbs. The new lineup released Fame, Fortune and Fornication in 2009, followed by A Best of Us... for the Rest of Us and Skacoustic in 2010. In January 2011, long-term trumpeter and multi-instrumentalist Scott Klopfenstein left the group for a similar reason as Wong, stating that he wanted to "dedicate his life to raising a family". John Christianson subsequently became the band's sole trumpeter, as Klopfenstein was replaced by Goldfinger touring saxophonist Matt Appleton.

After the release of Candy Coated Fury in 2012, another long-term horn player, trombonist Dan Regan, left the band in October 2013 to focus on life with his family. He was replaced by Billy Kottage. In the summer of 2014, Steen left to tour with America and was replaced by Ed "Smokey Beach" Larsen. This lineup released one album, Life Sucks... Let's Dance! in 2018, before Kottage left the band and was replaced in the summer of 2019 by touring musician Brian Robertson of Suburban Legends. The band went on hiatus in 2020 and has not returned to live performing since. In July 2024, Ice Nine Kills released a cover of "Walking On Sunshine" in collaboration with Reel Big Fish, featuring Dan Regan as a credited band member for the first time since 2013.. On April 24, 2026, Reel Big Fish were announced to be playing the Long Beach and Orlando dates for the Vans Warped Tour, with Scott Klopfenstein as a returning member additional to Regan.

== Members ==
=== Current ===
Image	Name	Years active	Instruments	Release contributions
	Aaron Barrett	1991–present	vocals (lead since 1993); guitar; keyboards	all Reel Big Fish releases
	Dan Regan	1994–2013; 2024–present	trombone; backing vocals	all releases from Buy This! (1994) to Candy Coated Fury (2012), and from "Walking On Sunshine" (2024) in collaboration with Ice Nine Kills
	Scott Klopfenstein	1995–2011; 2026–present	trumpet; rhythm guitar; keyboards; backing and additional lead vocals	all releases from Turn the Radio Off (1996) to Skacoustic (2010)
	John Christianson	2004–present	trumpet; backing vocals	all releases from We're Not Happy 'til You're Not Happy (2005) onwards
	Derek Gibbs	2007–present	bass; backing vocals	all releases from Fame, Fortune and Fornication (2009) onwards
	Matt Appleton	2011–present	saxophone; keyboards; backing and additional lead vocals	Candy Coated Fury (2012); Happy Skalidays (2014); Life Sucks... Let's Dance! (2018)
	Ed "Smokey Beach" Larsen	2014–present	drums; percussion	Life Sucks... Let's Dance! (2018)

=== Former ===
Image	Name	Years active	Instruments	Release contributions
	Matt Wong	1991–2007	bass; backing vocals	all releases from Reel Big Fish (1992) to Monkeys for Nothin' and the Chimps for Free (2007)
	Andrew Gonzales	1991–1999	drums; percussion	all releases from Reel Big Fish (1992) to Sold Out E.P. (2002)
	Ben Guzman	1991–1993	lead vocals	Reel Big Fish (1992)
	Lisa Smith	1991–1993	rhythm guitar	Reel Big Fish (1992)
	Zach Gilltrap	1991–1993	keyboards; synthesizers; programming	Reel Big Fish (1992)
	Eric Vismantas	1992–1994	trumpet	Reel Big Fish (1994)
	Stephan Reed	1993–1994	saxophone	Reel Big Fish (1994)
	Tavis Werts	1994–2001	trumpet; flugelhorn	all releases from Buy This! (1994) to Cheer Up! (2002)
	Adam Polakoff	1994–1995	saxophone	Buy This! (1994); Everything Sucks (1995); Keep Your Receipt (1997)
	Robert Quimby	1994–1995	trombone	Everything Sucks (1995); Keep Your Receipt (1997)
	Grant Barry	1995–1999	trombone; backing vocals	all releases from Turn the Radio Off (1996) to Sold Out E.P. (2002)
	Carlos de la Garza	1999–2003	drums; percussion	Sold Out E.P. (2002); Cheer Up! (2002); Live at the House of Blues (2003)
	Tyler Jones	2001–2004 (died 2020)	trumpet	Cheer Up! (2002); Live at the House of Blues (2003)
	Justin Ferreira	2003–2005	drums; percussion	We're Not Happy 'til You're Not Happy (2005)
	Ryland Steen	2005–2014	drums; percussion; backing vocals	all releases from Our Live Album Is Better Than Your Live Album (2006) to Life Sucks... Let's Dance! (2018)
	Billy Kottage	2013–2019	trombone; keyboards; backing vocals	Happy Skalidays (2014); Life Sucks... Let's Dance! (2018)

=== Touring ===
Image	Name	Years active	Instruments	Notes
	James Valentine	2000; 2001	lead guitar	Valentine took over guitar duties when Barrett injured his hand in 2000, and again in 2001 when Barrett fell down the stairs.
	Chris Rhodes	2002	trombone	Rhodes played on the 2002 Warped Tour.
	Michael Soprano	2008	trombone	Soprano played on the 2008 Warped Tour.
	Brian Robertson	2019–2020	trombone	Robertson played trombone following the departure of Billy Kottage.

== Lineups ==
Period	Members	Releases
December 1991 – 1992	Ben Guzman – lead vocals; Aaron Barrett – lead guitar, backing vocals; Lisa Smith – rhythm guitar; Matt Wong – bass, backing vocals; Zach Gilltrap – keyboards, synthesizers; Andrew Gonzales – drums, percussion	Reel Big Fish (1992)
1993	Ben Guzman – lead vocals; Aaron Barrett – lead guitar, backing vocals; Lisa Smith – rhythm guitar; Matt Wong – bass, backing vocals; Andrew Gonzales – drums, percussion; Eric Vismantas – trumpet	none
1993–1994	Aaron Barrett – lead vocals, guitar; Matt Wong – bass, backing vocals; Andrew Gonzales – drums, percussion; Eric Vismantas – trumpet; Stephan Reed – saxophone	Reel Big Fish (1994)
1994	Aaron Barrett – lead vocals, guitar; Matt Wong – bass, backing vocals; Andrew Gonzales – drums, percussion; Tavis Werts – trumpet, flugelhorn; Dan Regan – trombone, backing vocals; Adam Polakoff – saxophone	Buy This! (1994)
1994–1995	Aaron Barrett – lead vocals, guitar; Matt Wong – bass, backing vocals; Andrew Gonzales – drums, percussion; Tavis Werts – trumpet, flugelhorn; Dan Regan – trombone, backing vocals; Robert Quimby – trombone; Adam Polakoff – saxophone	Everything Sucks (1995); Keep Your Receipt (1997) – two tracks
1995 – February 1999	Aaron Barrett – lead vocals, guitar; Matt Wong – bass, backing vocals; Andrew Gonzales – drums, percussion; Tavis Werts – trumpet, flugelhorn; Scott Klopfenstein – trumpet, vocals, keyboards; Dan Regan – trombone, backing vocals; Grant Barry – trombone, backing vocals	Turn the Radio Off (1996); Keep Your Receipt (1997) – three tracks; Why Do They Rock So Hard? (1998); Sold Out E.P. (2002) – select tracks
February – March 1999	Aaron Barrett – lead vocals, guitar; Matt Wong – bass, backing vocals; Carlos de la Garza – drums, percussion; Tavis Werts – trumpet, flugelhorn; Scott Klopfenstein – trumpet, vocals; Dan Regan – trombone, backing vocals; Grant Barry – trombone, backing vocals	none
March 1999 – October 2001	Aaron Barrett – lead vocals, guitar; Matt Wong – bass, backing vocals; Carlos de la Garza – drums, percussion; Tavis Werts – trumpet, flugelhorn; Scott Klopfenstein – trumpet, vocals, guitar, keyboards; Dan Regan – trombone, backing vocals	Sold Out E.P. (2002) – select tracks; Cheer Up! (2002) – all but three tracks
November 2001 – summer 2003	Aaron Barrett – lead vocals, guitar; Matt Wong – bass, backing vocals; Carlos de la Garza – drums, percussion; Scott Klopfenstein – trumpet, vocals, guitar, keyboards; Tyler Jones – trumpet, flugelhorn; Dan Regan – trombone, backing vocals	Cheer Up! (2002) – three tracks; Live at the House of Blues (2003)
Summer 2003 – September 2004	Aaron Barrett – lead vocals, guitar; Matt Wong – bass, backing vocals; Justin Ferreira – drums, percussion; Scott Klopfenstein – trumpet, vocals, guitar, keyboards; Tyler Jones – trumpet, flugelhorn; Dan Regan – trombone, backing vocals	none
September 2004 – February 2005	Aaron Barrett – lead vocals, guitar; Matt Wong – bass, backing vocals; Justin Ferreira – drums, percussion; Scott Klopfenstein – trumpet, vocals, guitar, keyboards; John Christianson – trumpet, backing vocals; Dan Regan – trombone, backing vocals	We're Not Happy 'til You're Not Happy (2005)
February 2005 – June 2007	Aaron Barrett – lead vocals, guitar; Matt Wong – bass, backing vocals; Ryland Steen – drums, percussion, backing vocals; Scott Klopfenstein – trumpet, vocals, guitar, keyboards; John Christianson – trumpet, backing vocals; Dan Regan – trombone, backing vocals	Our Live Album Is Better Than Your Live Album (2006); Duet All Night (2007); Monkeys for Nothin' and the Chimps for Free (2007)
June 2007 – January 2011	Aaron Barrett – lead vocals, guitar; Derek Gibbs – bass, backing vocals; Ryland Steen – drums, percussion, backing vocals; Scott Klopfenstein – trumpet, vocals, guitar, keyboards; John Christianson – trumpet, backing vocals; Dan Regan – trombone, backing vocals	Fame, Fortune and Fornication (2009); Live! In Concert! (2009); A Best of Us... for the Rest of Us (2010); Skacoustic (2010)
January 2011 – October 2013	Aaron Barrett – lead vocals, guitar, keyboards; Derek Gibbs – bass, backing vocals; Ryland Steen – drums, percussion, backing vocals; John Christianson – trumpet, backing vocals; Dan Regan – trombone, backing vocals; Matt Appleton – saxophone, keyboards, vocals	Candy Coated Fury (2012)
October 2013 – July 2014	Aaron Barrett – lead vocals, guitar, keyboards; Derek Gibbs – bass, backing vocals; Ryland Steen – drums, percussion, backing vocals; John Christianson – trumpet, backing vocals; Billy Kottage – trombone, keyboards, backing vocals; Matt Appleton – saxophone, keyboards, vocals	Happy Skalidays (2014)
July 2014 – April 2019	Aaron Barrett – lead vocals, guitar, keyboards; Derek Gibbs – bass, backing vocals; Ed "Smokey Beach" Larsen – drums, percussion; John Christianson – trumpet, backing vocals; Billy Kottage – trombone, keyboards, backing vocals; Matt Appleton – saxophone, keyboards, vocals	Life Sucks... Let's Dance! (2018)
June 2019 – July 2024	Aaron Barrett – lead vocals, guitar, keyboards; Derek Gibbs – bass, backing vocals; Ed "Smokey Beach" Larsen – drums, percussion; John Christianson – trumpet, backing vocals; Matt Appleton – saxophone, keyboards, vocals	none to date
July 2024 - April 2026	Aaron Barrett – lead vocals, guitar, keyboards; Derek Gibbs – bass, backing vocals; Ed "Smokey Beach" Larsen – drums, percussion; John Christianson – trumpet, backing vocals; Matt Appleton – saxophone, keyboards, vocals; Dan Regan - trombone	"Walking On Sunshine" (2024) in collaboration with Ice Nine Kills
April 2026 – present	Aaron Barrett – lead vocals, guitar, keyboards; Derek Gibbs – bass, backing vocals; Ed "Smokey Beach" Larsen – drums, percussion; John Christianson – trumpet, backing vocals; Matt Appleton – saxophone, keyboards, vocals; Dan Regan - trombone, backing vocals; Scott Klopfenstein - trumpet, vocals, guitar	"Evil Is Contagious" (2026) in collaboration with TX2
