= Reel Big Fish discography =

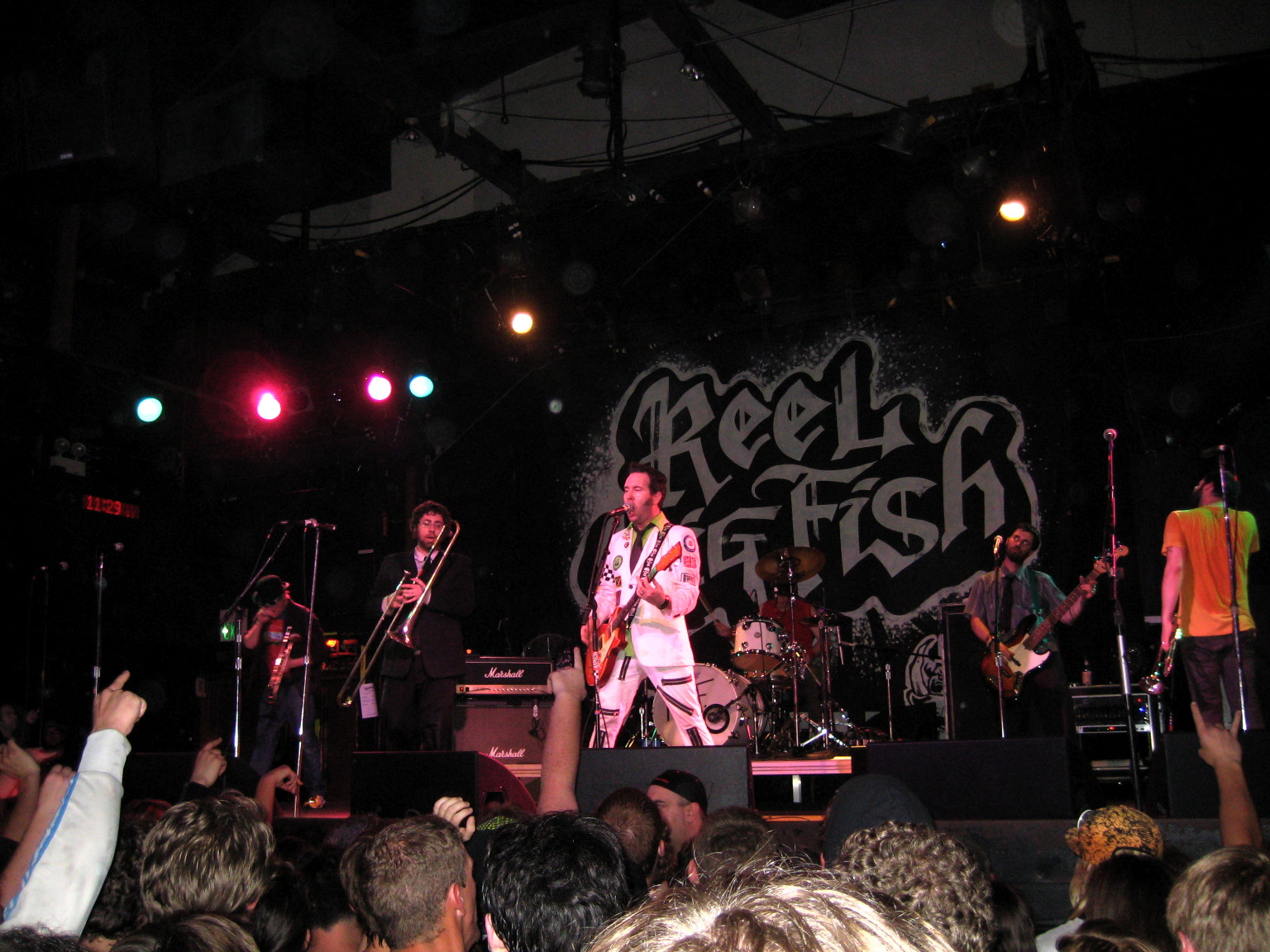
- Reel Big Fish performing at The Catalyst in Santa Cruz, California on March 27, 2008.
- Studio albums: 9
- Extended plays: 3
- Soundtrack albums: 16
- Live albums: 1
- Compilation albums: 5
- Video albums: 3
- Demos: 3
- 7" vinyl records: 2

The following is a complete discography of the band Reel Big Fish.

== Albums ==
=== Studio albums ===
List of studio albums, with selected chart positions
Title	Album details	Peak chart positions								Certifications (sales thresholds)
Title	Album details	US	US Alt.	US Indie	US Rock	AUS	SCO	UK	UK Indie	Certifications (sales thresholds)
Everything Sucks	Released: May 5, 1995; Label: Piss-Off; Formats: CD	—	—	—	—	—	—	—	—	
Turn the Radio Off	Released: August 13, 1996; Label: Mojo; Formats: CD, CS, DL, LP	57	—	—	—	—	—	—	—	RIAA: Gold
Why Do They Rock So Hard?	Released: October 20, 1998; Label: Mojo; Formats: CD, CS, DL, LP	67	—	—	—	54	—	—	—	
Cheer Up!	Released: June 25, 2002; Label: Mojo/Jive; Formats: CD, CS, DL	115	—	—	—	47	97	96	14	
We're Not Happy 'til You're Not Happy	Released: April 5, 2005; Label: Mojo/Jive/Zomba; Formats: CD, DL	155	—	—	—	—	—	—	—	
Monkeys for Nothin' and the Chimps for Free	Released: July 10, 2007; Label: Rock Ridge; Formats: CD+DVD-V, DL, LP	106	—	13	—	—	—	190	—	
Fame, Fortune and Fornication	Released: January 20, 2009; Label: Rock Ridge; Formats: CD, DL, LP	177	—	26	—	—	—	—	—	
Candy Coated Fury	Released: July 31, 2012; Label: Rock Ridge; Formats: CD, DL, LP	91	21	14	33	—	—	—	24	
Life Sucks...Let's Dance!	Released: December 21, 2018; Label: Rock Ridge; Format: CD, DL, LP	—	—	26	—	—	—	—	37	
"—" denotes album that did not chart or was not released

=== Live albums ===
Title	Album details
Our Live Album Is Better Than Your Live Album	Released: August 22, 2006; Label: Rock Ridge; Formats: CD+DVD-V

=== Compilations ===
List of compilation albums, with selected chart positions
Title	Album details	Peak chart positions			
Title	Album details	SCO	UK	UK Indie	UK Rock
Viva La Internet/Blank CD	Released: 2000; Label: Self-released; Formats: CD	—	—	—	—
Favorite Noise	Released: March 12, 2002; Label: Mojo/Jive; Formats: CD, CS, DL	92	115	19	17
Greatest Hit...And More	Released: November 21, 2006; Label: Mojo/Jive/Zomba; Formats: CD, DL	—	—	—	—
A Best of Us... For the Rest of Us	Released: July 20, 2010; Label: Rock Ridge; Formats: CD, DL	—	—	—	—
Skacoustic	Released: 2011; Formats: LP	—	—	—	—
"—" denotes album that did not chart or was not released

== EPs ==
List of EPs, with selected chart positions
Title	Album details	Peak chart positions				
Title	Album details	US Indie	SCO	UK	UK Indie	UK Rock
Keep Your Receipt EP	Released: July 1, 1997; Label: Mojo/Jive	—	—	—	—	—
Sold Out EP	Released: 2002; Label: Mojo/Jive	—	60	62	7	7
Duet All Night Long	Released: February 20, 2007; Label: Reignition; Split EP with Zolof the Rock & Roll Destroyer	—	—	—	—	—
Happy Skalidays	Released: December 15, 2014; Label: Rock Ridge	46	—	—	—	—
"—" denotes album that did not chart or was not released

== Demos ==
Title	Album details
In The Good Old Days	Released: 1992
Return of the Mullet	Released: 1994
Buy This!	Released: 1994

== Video ==
Title	Album details
The Show Must Go Off! Reel Big Fish - Live at the House of Blues	Released: 2003
Reel Big Fish Live! In Concert!	Released: 2009

== 7" Vinyl Records ==
Title	Album details
Teen Beef	with Goldfinger on reverse side; Released: 1996
Vacationing in Palm Springs	with Cherry Poppin' Daddies on reverse side; Released: 1997
Where Have You Been?	UK Exclusive; Released: 2002
Monkey Man	UK Exclusive; Released: 2005

== Singles ==
Title	Year	Peak chart positions							Album
Title	Year	US Air.	US Mod.	AUS Hit.	SCO	UK	UK Indie	UK Rock	Album
"Sell Out"	1997	69	10	—	—	—	—	—	Turn the Radio Off
"Beer"	1997	—	—	—	—	—	—	—	Turn the Radio Off
"She Has a Girlfriend Now"	1997	—	—	—	—	—	—	—	Turn the Radio Off
"Take On Me"	1998	—	—	—	—	—	—	—	Why Do They Rock So Hard?
"The Set Up (You Need This)"	1998	—	—	—	—	—	—	—	Why Do They Rock So Hard?
"Somebody Hates Me"	1998	—	—	—	—	—	—	—	Why Do They Rock So Hard?
"The Kids Don't Like It"	1999	—	—	—	—	—	—	—	Why Do They Rock So Hard?
"Where Have You Been?"	2002	—	—	12	78	76	16	7	Cheer Up!
"Talkin' 'bout a Revolution"	2005	—	—	—	—	—	—	—	We're Not Happy 'til You're Not Happy
"Party Down"	2007	—	—	—	—	—	—	—	Monkeys for Nothin' and the Chimps for Free
"Slow Down"	2007	—	—	—	—	—	—	—	Monkeys for Nothin' and the Chimps for Free
"Monkey Man"	2009	—	—	—	—	86	16	—	Fame, Fortune and Fornication
"I Dare You to Break My Heart"	2012	—	—	—	—	—	—	—	Candy Coated Fury
"Don't Stop Skankin'"	2012	—	—	—	—	—	—	—	Candy Coated Fury
"Evil Approaches"	2017	—	—	—	—	—	—	—	Punk Rock Halloween
"You Can't Have All of Me"	2018	—	—	—	—	—	—	—	Life Sucks... Let's Dance!
"—" denotes recording that did not chart or was not released

== Soundtracks ==
Title	Year	Soundtrack
Skatanic	1995	Misfits Of Ska
Unity	1997	Take Warning: The Songs of Operation Ivy
Hungry Like the Wolf	1997	The Duran Duran Tribute Album
Take On Me	1997	BASEketball Original Soundtrack
Beer	1997	BASEketball Original Soundtrack
Gigantic	1999	Where is My Mind? – A Tribute to the Pixies
Kiss Me Deadly	2000	Metalliska
Kiss Me Deadly	2000	The Solution to Benefit Heal the Bay
Take On Me	2000	Samba De Amigo
Monkey Man	2002	The Wild Thornberrys Movie Soundtrack
Doo-Doo	2002	Because We Care: A Benefit for the Children's Hospital of Orange County
Baroque Hoedown (Main Street Electrical Parade)	2002	Dive into Disney
It's Not Easy (Pete's Dragon)	2004	Mosh Pit on Disney (Japanese Only)
We Close Our Eyes	2005	Dead Bands Party: A Tribute to Oingo Boingo
Stray Cat Strut	2006	Go Cat Go! A Tribute to Stray Cats
Rave-o-lution (Rave Master theme)	2006	TOKYOPOP Presents: Anime Trax, Vol. 1
Snoop Dog, Baby	2017	Ladybird Soundtrack
No Hope (A collaboration with Louser)	2022	Clerks III Soundtrack

== Multiple titled songs ==
Songs that have different titles on different releases, despite being essentially the same song.

Original Title	Album	Alternate Title	Album
Fuck Yourself	Everything Sucks	All I Want Is More	Turn the Radio Off
I'm Cool	Everything Sucks	Cool Ending	Turn the Radio Off
I'm Cool	Why Do They Rock So Hard?	Cool Ending	Turn the Radio Off
In the Pit	Our Live Album Is Better than Your Live Album	Thank You for Not Moshing	Why Do They Rock So Hard?
In the Pit	Teen Beef	Thank You for Not Moshing	Why Do They Rock So Hard?
Big Fuckin' Star	Everything Sucks	Big Star	Why Do They Rock So Hard?

== Cover songs ==
Reel Big Fish are well known for their cover songs (so much so that their former label, Jive Records, chose to promote the album We're Not Happy 'Til You're Not Happy with stickers on the CD jewel case proclaiming that the album included "Talkin' 'bout a Revolution" and "Story of My Life"; both covers) and frequently end live shows with their cover of a-ha's 1985 hit "Take On Me". Reel Big Fish released their first studio album composed only of cover songs, entitled Fame, Fortune and Fornication, in January 2009.

Although the band are known to play a variety of other songs live regularly, this is a comprehensive, roughly chronological list of all known cover songs officially recorded by Reel Big Fish.

Song	Originally By	Album(s)
"Take On Me"	a-ha	Teen Beef BASEketball Soundtrack; Sold Out EP; Viva La Internet; Samba De Amigo; Why Do They Rock So Hard? Favorite Noise; Our Live Album is Better Than Your Live Album; The Best Songs We Never Wrote; Released as a CD single
"Unity"	Operation Ivy	Keep Your Receipt EP Take Warning: The Songs of Operation Ivy; Our Live Album Is Better Than Your Live Album (DVD); Viva La Internet; The Best Songs We Never Wrote
"There Is Nothin' Like a Dame"	Rodgers and Hammerstein	Vacationing in Palm Springs Viva La Internet; Where Have You Been? UK single
"Hungry Like the Wolf"	Duran Duran	Sold Out EP Why Do They Rock So Hard? The Duran Duran Tribute Album; Viva La Internet
"Kiss Me Deadly"	Lita Ford	Viva La Internet Cheer Up! Our Live Album is Better Than Your Live Album; The Best Songs We Never Wrote
"Gigantic"	Pixies	Viva La Internet Where Is My Mind?
"Uniform of Destruction"	Suburban Rhythm	Viva La Internet; Runnin' Naked Thru the Cornfield
"Mele Kalikimaka"	Robert Alexander Anderson	Viva La Internet
"Love Boat"	Jack Jones	Viva La Internet
"Boys Don't Cry"	The Cure	Viva La Internet Our Live Album Is Better Than Your Live Album; The Best Songs We Never Wrote
"Ska Sucks"	Propagandhi	Viva La Internet
"Boss DJ"	Sublime	Viva La Internet Cheer Up! The Best Songs We Never Wrote
"Main Street Electrical Parade"	Main Street Electrical Parade	Dive into Disney
"New York, New York"	Liza Minnelli	Cheer Up!
"Rock It with I"	The Melodians	Cheer Up!
"Give It to Me"	The J. Geils Band	Cheer Up! The Best Songs We Never Wrote
"Dance Wid Me"	Hepcat	The Show Must Go Off! Reel Big Fish Live at the House of Blues DVD
"So Lonely"	The Police	The Show Must Go Off! DVD
"Monkey Man"	Toots & the Maytals	The Wild Thornberrys Movie Soundtrack Fame, Fortune and Fornication; The Best Songs We Never Wrote
"It's Not Easy"	Helen Reddy and Sean Marshall	Mosh Pit On Disney Duet All Night Long
"We Hate It When Our Friends Become Successful"	Morrissey	We're Not Happy 'Til You're Not Happy The Best Songs We Never Wrote
"Talkin' 'bout a Revolution"	Tracy Chapman	We're Not Happy 'Til You're Not Happy Our Live Album is Better Than Your Live Album
"Story of My Life"	Social Distortion	We're Not Happy 'Til You're Not Happy
"Stray Cat Strut"	The Stray Cats	Go Cat Go! A Tribute to Stray Cats The Best Songs We Never Wrote
"We Close Our Eyes"	Oingo Boingo	Dead Bands Party: A Tribute to Oingo Boingo The Best Songs We Never Wrote
"Ask"	The Smiths	Duet All Night Long
"Lyin' Ass Bitch"	Fishbone	Duet All Night Long
"Another Day in Paradise"	Phil Collins	Monkeys for Nothin' and the Chimps For Free The Best Songs We Never Wrote
"Nothin' But a Good Time"	Poison	Fame, Fortune and Fornication The Best Songs We Never Wrote
"Mama Weer All Crazee Now"	Slade	Fame, Fortune and Fornication
"Veronica Sawyer"	Edna's Goldfish	Fame, Fortune and Fornication; The Best Songs We Never Wrote
"Authority Song"	John Mellencamp	Fame, Fortune and Fornication
"Brown Eyed Girl"	Van Morrison	Fame, Fortune and Fornication; The Best Songs We Never Wrote
"The Long Run"	The Eagles	Fame, Fortune and Fornication
"Won't Back Down"	Tom Petty	Fame, Fortune and Fornication
"Keep a Cool Head"	Desmond Dekker & the Aces	Fame, Fortune and Fornication
"Talk Dirty to Me"	Poison	Fame, Fortune and Fornication The Best Songs We Never Wrote
"Twist and Crawl"	The English Beat	Fame, Fortune and Fornication
"Don't Let Me Down Gently"	The Wonder Stuff	Candy Coated Fury
"The Promise"	When in Rome	Candy Coated Fury
"Grandma Got Run Over by a Reindeer"	Elmo & Patsy	Happy Skalidays
"Lickle Drummond Boy"	Harry Simeone Chorale	Happy Skalidays
"Carol of the Beers"	Mykola Leontovych	Happy Skalidays
"Auld Lang Syne"	Robert Burns	Happy Skalidays
"Evil Approaches"	The Forces of Evil	Punk Rock Halloween
"Ska Show"	The Forces of Evil	Life Sucks...Let's Dance!
"The Good Old Days"	The Forces of Evil	Life Sucks...Let's Dance!

An instrumental version of the song also exists

bonus track only available on the vinyl album or via download
