= Sell Out (Reel Big Fish song) =

Single by Reel Big Fish

from the album Turn the Radio Off
- Released: 1996
- Genre: Ska punk; alternative rock
- Length: 3:47
- Label: Mojo
- Songwriters: Aaron Barrett; Scott Klopfenstein
- Producers: Jay Rifkin; John Avila

Reel Big Fish singles chronology
"Sell Out" (1996)	"Take On Me" (1998)

"Sell Out" is the debut single by American ska punk band Reel Big Fish. Released as the first track on the group's second album Turn the Radio Off in 1996, the song has proven Reel Big Fish's most popular release.

== Reception ==
"Sell Out" was released in 1996 and gained the band a distinct amount of attention, becoming a hit in 1997. It received regular radio airplay in America and competed favourably on the charts in the UK, consequently, the video (see below) soon gained regular rotation on MTV, much to the surprise of Reel Big Fish bassist, Matt Wong. The band has since largely used it to close its live shows, referring to it as "[the band's] big hit from the '90s"; Aaron Barrett can be heard on Our Live Album Is Better than Your Live Album yelling at the crowd that the band cannot play the song until the end because of the song's status. It also appeared on the soundtrack to the video games FIFA 2000, Aggressive Inline, and Disney's Extreme Skate Adventure. The song also appeared in the season three finale of My Name Is Earl.

== Video ==
A video clip was released some time later, which starts out as a soap opera parody called As the Fish Turns featuring the members of the band working at a roadside fast food outlet (conforming to the lyrics), complete with Matt Wong as the mascot in a giant French Fries outfit. They are recruited by a man played by their agent into the world of music at the fictional record company Big Grub Records. They compete against several other types of bands, such as 'Rap', 'Rock' and 'Metal' for the rights to a contract (the band members themselves wear jackets emblazoned with the words 'Ska Band'), but Matt must be pulled out of his costume. In the end, the people trying to extract him resort to dynamite, which he tosses away and runs for his life. The building explodes, and the last scene shows Matt back at the fast food outlet.

The film clip references the popular Star Wars movies (in that their agent's car makes a TIE fighter noise as it drives). Also, Goldfinger, a band known to tour with Reel Big Fish, appear briefly in the clip throwing the group menacing looks.

Matt has stated that, upon first seeing the music video on MTV, he had not expected it and the sandwich he was eating fell out of his mouth in astonishment; he was then unable to talk to anyone about his response as the other band members were all at work.

== Popularity ==
The song is Reel Big Fish's most successful single, peaking at number 10 on the US alternative songs chart. It was the band's only single to ever make the US charts. This is addressed by the band in the song "One Hit Wonderful" from the album We're Not Happy 'til You're Not Happy, in which the band members complain that their career is ignored in favor of one of their classics. Although "Sell Out" is not mentioned by name, "One Hit Wonderful" opens and closes with radio static in which short excerpts from "Sell Out" can be heard.

This song has become a sort of running joke amongst the band members and fan base. In 2006, the best-of album Greatest Hit...and More was released by former label Jive and titled to refer to the fact that "Sell Out" was, at least on the charts, the band's only hit. The band, in particular frontman Aaron Barrett, have experienced frustration trying to one-up the song. In an interview, Barrett was asked if he felt that "Sell Out" was the band's biggest accomplishment and everything else was downhill. He responded that "Sometimes you feel like that, like your band is around for a long time and you wonder if you're going to get bigger. You wonder if radio will ever play you again, or if you're ever going to have a hit bigger than the novelty song you had in the '90s. You're thirty, make a living playing music, and can't do anything else. There is a lot to worry about."

The band notes, however, that although the song remains its greatest hit, it is not the song that has kept its popularity alive since the group began playing. Barrett instead credits that to another song originally from Everything Sucks and re-recorded for Turn the Radio Off, "Beer", a song which, the band asserts, did not receive the same amount of media attention as "Sell Out" because of its suggestiveness.

The song is also referenced in The Aquabats' cover of Operation Ivy's "Knowledge", in which The MC Bat Commander leads a chorus of children in the song. At the beginning of the song, when the Commander tells the kids, "it's time to sing that song we learned today", the children all shout in unison, "Sell Out!", to which the Commander replies, "No, not that song, the other one!" The song appeared on Take Warning, an Operation Ivy tribute album which also included a cover of "Unity" by Reel Big Fish.

This song also plays during Philadelphia Flyers home games at the Wells Fargo Center while public address announcer Lou Nolan announces the attendance, except for the rare occasions where the attendance is not a sellout.

The song was played extensively during the 1997 Florida Marlins MLB Playoffs run which culminated in the franchise's first World Series title.

In the Beijing 2008 Olympics, the song was used in-between plays of beach volleyball.

== Track listing ==
U.S. edition
No.	Title	Length
1.	"Sell Out"	3:46
2.	"241"	2:43
3.	"Unity"	2:20

European edition
No.	Title	Length
1.	"Sell Out"	3:46
2.	"S.R."	1:25
3.	"241"	2:48

== Charts ==
Chart (1997)	Peak position
US Modern Rock Tracks (Billboard)	10
US Hot 100 Airplay (Billboard)	69
