= Beer (song) =

- Promo CD for the BASEketball soundtrack

Song by Reel Big Fish

from the album Turn the Radio Off and BASEketball soundtrack
- Released: August 13, 1996
- Recorded: April – May 1996
- Studio: Media Ventures, Santa Monica, California
- Genre: Ska punk
- Length: 3:32
- Label: Mojo
- Songwriter(s): Aaron Barrett
- Producer(s): Jay Rifkin, John Avila

"Beer" is a song by American ska punk band Reel Big Fish and featured on their debut album Everything Sucks in 1995 as well as their major label debut Turn the Radio Off the following year. While not achieving the chart success of the album's lead single, "Sell Out", the song is credited with having kept the band's popularity alive over the years and becoming the band's most downloaded song, and continues to be a staple at live shows.

== History ==
Lead singer and guitarist Aaron Barrett was inspired to write the song after noticing bassist Matt Wong and drummer Andrew Gonzales were into drinking beer at the time, and sought to make a song about that, which they immediately supported. The original composition featured no horn parts because the band's horn section had just quit, in conjunction with the fact that Barrett took heavy inspiration from the guitar-driven ska sound of Sublime. Barrett considers it Reel Big Fish's attempt at writing a Sublime song.

The song was originally released on the band's third demo tape, Buy This! in 1994. The following year, a similar recording was featured on the band's debut album Everything Sucks. When the song was once again re-recorded for the band's major label debut, Turn the Radio Off in 1996, additional instrumentation was added. Already a popular song at live shows, the song was picked up to be used on the soundtrack for the film BASEketball in 1998, which also saw the band featured in the film performing the song. At this point the song was released as a promotional single.

The Turn the Radio Off recording of the song was featured on the compilations Favorite Noise (2002) and Greatest Hit...and More (2006) and additional studio re-recordings are featured as a bonus track on the album We're Not Happy 'til You're Not Happy (2005) and on the greatest hits compilation A Best of Us for the Rest of Us (2010). A live version is featured on the album Our Live Album Is Better than Your Live Album (2006) and an acoustic version is on the album Skacoustic (2016).

== Reception ==
Barrett considers "Beer" to be one of his top ten favorite Reel Big Fish songs. Despite the song's cult popularity, "Beer" didn't achieve mainstream success on the level of "Sell Out" because of its suggestiveness. At live shows, it's often played with Self Esteem by the Offspring. Because of the song's popularity, it is often reserved as a set closer.

== Track listing ==
=== Promo CD ===
1. "Beer" – 3:32
2. "Beer (Instrumental)" – 2:31
