= Jeffries Fan Club =

- Origin: Orange County, CA
- Genres: Third-wave ska, Ska-punk
- Years active: 1996–2001
- Label: Vegas Records
- Members: Jeffrey Pouw
- Past members: Tim Carpenter; Chris Colonnier; Mike Dziurgot; Justin Ferreira; Derek Gibbs; Steve Tucker; Chris Rush; Sonnie Johnston

Jeffries Fan Club was a southern California Third-wave ska band formed in 1996. The band released several albums on now-defunct Vegas Records before breaking up in 2001. The band played their final show January 6, 2001, at The Glasshouse in Pomona, which was later released on CD under the title Last Show at the Glasshouse. Their breakup was the cover story in the OC Weekly issue dated January 5, 2001. In the OC Weekly article, it was revealed that the primary reason for the band's breakup was lead singer/guitarist Mike Dziurgot's desire to return to school. In the article, he also mentioned that he and several of the members didn't enjoy performing unless they were under the influence of alcohol, and that this affliction had prompted him to return to his Christian roots.

The band played a reunion show at the House of Blues in Anaheim on November 9, 2002. The band also reunited for two "anniversary" shows, celebrating 10 years since the band was formed, at Chain Reaction on April 14 and April 15, 2006.

In 2003, the band was featured on OC Weekly's list of "The 129 Greatest OC Bands Ever" at No. 96.

== Final lineup ==
- Mike Dziurgot - lead vocals & guitar
- Chris Colonnier - trombone & vocals
- Tim Carpenter - guitar
- Justin Ferreira - drums
- Derek Gibbs - bass
- Steve Tucker - trumpet

=== Previous members ===
- Sonnie Johnston - guitar
- Chris Rush - trumpet

== Post-breakup ==
- After the band's breakup, Mike Dziurgot attended Fullerton College where he majored in journalism.
- In 2016 Mike Dziurgot became involved in a new project entitled The Dream Gypsies. Mike Dziurgot became a co-songwriter, lead singer and rhythm guitarist for the project. The first album, The Analogue Chronicles, has a scheduled release date of June 2017.
- From 2001 to 2005, Derek Gibbs, Chris Colonnier, and Justin Ferreira were members of The Forces of Evil, a band fronted by Reel Big Fish's Aaron Barrett.
- Justin Ferreira also played drums in Reel Big Fish from 2003 to 2005 and appears on the band's 2005 album We're Not Happy 'Til You're Not Happy. He left the band before the album's release to focus on his new band, Takota. As a result, he is only listed in the album credits as an "additional musician."
- Derek Gibbs joined Reel Big Fish in June 2007, replacing the band's original bassist, Matt Wong.
- Sonnie Johnston joined Five Iron Frenzy, replacing guitarist Scott Kerr. He remained with them through to their 2003 hiatus, and remains a member in their 2012–present reformation.
- Tim Carpenter became a successful Architectural and Wedding Photographer.

== Discography ==
- Feelin' Sorry...For All The Hearts We've Broken (1997)
- Nothing To Prove (1998)
- Invisible Tank Slow Gherkin/Jeffries Fan Club split (1998)
- JFC Sucks: The Early Years (1999)
- Changing the Nation (2000)
- JFC Live! (2000) Live album
- Last Show at the Glasshouse (2001) - Live album
