= Take On Me =

1984 single by a-ha

- Single release of first recording

Single by a-ha
- B-side: "And You Tell Me"
- Released: 19 October 1984
- Studio: RG Jones, London
- Genre: Synth-pop; new wave
- Length: 3:18 (7-inch single version); 3:46 (12-inch version)
- Label: Warner Bros.
- Songwriters: Pål Waaktaar; Magne Furuholmen; Morten Harket
- Producer: Tony Mansfield

A-ha singles chronology
"Take On Me" (1984)	"Love Is Reason" (1985)

"Take On Me"

Single by a-ha

from the album Hunting High and Low
- B-side: "Love Is Reason"
- Released: 5 April 1985 (UK)
- Genre: Synth-pop; new wave
- Length: 3:44 (7-inch single version); 3:48 (album version); 4:48 (12-inch version); 3:51 (instrumental version); 3:41 (video version)
- Producer: Alan Tarney

Music video
- "Take On Me" on YouTube

"Take On Me" is a song by the Norwegian synth-pop band a-ha. The original version, recorded in 1984 and released in October of that year, was produced by Tony Mansfield and remixed by John Ratcliff. The 1985 international hit version was produced by Alan Tarney for the group's debut studio album, Hunting High and Low (1985). The recording combines synth-pop with a varied instrumentation, including acoustic guitars, keyboards, and drums.

The original 1984 version of "Take On Me" failed to chart in the United Kingdom, as did the first of its two 1985 releases. The second of those 1985 releases charted in September 1985, reaching number two on the UK Singles Chart in October. In the United States in October 1985, the single topped Billboard's Hot 100, bolstered by the wide exposure on MTV of director Steve Barron's innovative music video featuring the band in a live-action pencil-sketch animation sequence. The video won six awards and was nominated for two others at the 1986 MTV Video Music Awards.

== Background ==
"Take On Me" originated from Pål Waaktaar and Magne Furuholmen's previous band Bridges, who first composed a number called "Miss Eerie" when they were 15 and 16 years old, but felt too much like a bubblegum ad. Initially the band felt the riff was too pop-oriented for their band, thus the first version of the song was more "punky" in an attempt to offset the riff. The first take of the song was inspired in part by Doors member Ray Manzarek and his "almost mathematical but very melodic, structured way of playing". Waaktaar considered the song too poppy for their intended dark style, but Furuholmen recalled thinking it was "quite catchy".

Soon after Bridges disbanded, Waaktaar and Furuholmen relocated to London to try to break into the music industry there, but after six months they returned to Norway. They were joined by their school friend, singer Morten Harket, who heard the song and said the keyboard riff had the character of a universal hit sound. The three began working on demos, including a new version of the song, which was renamed "Lesson One" before it evolved into "Take On Me". In January 1983, A-ha returned to London in search of a recording contract. They intended the song to show off Harket's vocal range, which led to his vocals "doing this spiralling thing".

== Recording and production ==
The band moved into an apartment in London and began contacting record companies and publishing houses. After a few meetings with various A&R personnel, they signed with the publishing house Lionheart. A-ha returned to Norway to earn some money; when they returned to London, they left Lionheart out of frustration. They decided to record new demos, and chose the studio of musician and producer John Ratcliff, intending to re-record five songs. The band signed with Ratcliff, who introduced them to manager Terry Slater. With this encouragement, the band completed some songs, including "Take On Me". After a few meetings, Slater signed them with Warner Bros. Records UK.

The trio met with producer Tony Mansfield, an expert in the use of the Fairlight CMI, who mixed the demos with electronic instrumentation. The sound was not what A-ha had hoped to achieve, and the album was remixed. The band rushed to release "Take On Me" as a single in the United Kingdom but it only charted at 137.

Former Warner Brothers UK and Reprise executive Andrew Wickham signed A-ha to Warner Brothers America, after learning several previous attempts had failed to make "Take On Me" a commercial success. The next release was not successful either and featured a very ordinary performance video. He authorised considerable investment in the band: on Slater's recommendation, producer Alan Tarney was commissioned to refine the song. The new recording achieved a cleaner and more soaring sound and a coda section instead of the earlier quick fade-out; the song was soon completed and re-released in the UK, but the record label's office in London gave them little support, and the single flopped for the second time.

Wickham placed A-ha on high priority and applied a lateral strategy with further investment. Ayeroff's co-worker John Beug suggested they should base the video on a student animated short he had seen, called "Commuter", by Michael Patterson and Candace Reckinger. Director Steve Barron shot and edited the video, where some of the segments were then drawn over by Patterson, while Reckinger did the mattes, creating a revolutionary rotoscope animated music video which took six months in total to make. The single was released in the US one month after the music video. It charted atop the Billboard Hot 100 and was a hit worldwide, reaching No. 1 in several countries.

== Composition ==
"Take On Me"
A 23-second sample from "Take On Me", featuring Harket's high-pitched falsetto, with a backing track that mixes acoustic and electric guitars and electronic instrumentation

"Take On Me" is a synth-pop and new wave song that includes acoustic and electric guitars and keyboards, written at a tempo of 169 beats per minute. The lyrics are a plea for love and constructed in a verse–chorus form with a bridge before the final chorus. The song is written in the key of A major with a chord progression of Bm7–E–A–D–E in the verse, A–C♯m7/G♯–F♯m–D in the chorus, and C♯m–G–C♯m–G–Bm–E in the bridge. Harket demonstrates a vocal range of over two and a half octaves. He sings the lowest pitch in the song, A_{2} (the tonic), at the beginning of the chorus, on the first syllable of the phrase "Take On Me". As the chorus progresses, Harket's voice hits ever higher notes, reaching a falsetto and hitting the song's highest note, E_{5}, (the dominant) at the end. Rolling Stone has thus noted the song as "having one of the hardest-to-sing choruses in pop history". A mix of a drum machine, the LinnDrum, acoustic guitars, and electronic instrumentation serves as the song's backing track.

== Music videos ==
=== First video ===
The first release of "Take On Me" in 1984 includes a completely different recording; this mix was featured in the first video, which shows the band singing with a blue background.

=== Second video ===
Lead singer Morten Harket and actress Bunty Bailey in a scene from the music video, which features them in a pencil-sketch animation / live-action combination (rotoscoping).

The second video, directed by film director Steve Barron, is the far more widely recognised video for the song. It was filmed in 1985 at Kim's cafe, which is located on the corner of Wandsworth Road and Pensbury Place in Wandsworth, southwest London, and on a sound stage in London. The cafe scenes feature the English actress Bunty Bailey, who became a-ha singer Morton Harket's girlfriend following the shoot. The video used a pencil-sketch animation and live-action combination called rotoscoping, in which the live-action footage is traced using a frame-by-frame process to give the characters realistic movements. Approximately 3,000 frames were rotoscoped, which took 16 weeks to complete. The idea of the video was suggested by Warner Bros. executive Jeff Ayeroff, who was pivotal in making "Take on Me" a globally recognised music hit.

The video was theatrically distributed as a "Music Zap" by Music Motions to over 200 theaters, playing before films like Mad Max Beyond Thunderdome, Weird Science, Back to the Future, and E.T the Extra-Terrestrial. The theatrical edit has remixed Dolby four-channel surround sound, as well as extra animated footage.

The music video was remastered to 2160p (4K) in 2019 from the original 35mm film and released on YouTube, while retaining its original URL and upload date of 6 January 2010. The remaster also contains new sound effects (revving motorbikes etc.) not featured on the original clip. On 17 February 2020, the music video reached one billion views on YouTube. Prior to that date, only four songs from the 20th century had reached that mark ("November Rain" and "Sweet Child o' Mine" by Guns N' Roses, "Smells Like Teen Spirit" by Nirvana, and "Bohemian Rhapsody" by Queen)—making "Take On Me" the fifth video from that time period to do so, and the first Scandinavian act to achieve this. By 20 September 2024, the music video had received 2 billion views on YouTube, making it the first music video from the 1980s to achieve this milestone.

In 2019, Morten Harket and Bunty Bailey reunited at the cafe in Wandsworth where part of the video was shot (known as the Savoy cafe in 2019, and the Turkish Chef Mediterranean Restaurant in 2025), 34 years after the video was made.

==== Plot ====
The video's main theme is a romantic fantasy narrative. It begins with a montage of pencil drawings in a comic-book style representing motorcycle sidecar racing, in which the hero (Morten Harket) is pursued by two opponents (Philip Jackson and Alfie Curtis).

In a café, a young woman (Bunty Bailey) is reading the comic book depicting the race. As she reads, the waitress brings her coffee and the bill. The comic's hero, after winning the race, seemingly winks at the woman from the page. His pencil-drawn hand suddenly reaches out of the comic book, inviting the woman into it.

Once inside, she too appears in the pencil-drawn form as he sings to her and introduces her to his black-and-white world which features a looking-glass portal where people and objects look real on one side and pencil-drawn on the other.

Back in the café, the waitress returns to find the woman missing. Believing the customer left without paying the bill, she angrily crumples the comic book and throws it into a bin. This causes the hero's two opposing racers to reappear as villains, one of them armed with a large pipe wrench. The racers smash the looking glass with the pipe wrench, trapping the woman in the comic book. The hero punches one of the thugs aside and retreats with the woman into a maze of paper. Arriving at a dead end, he tears a hole in the paper wall so that the woman can escape. He remains in the comic book as the opposing racers menacingly close in on him. The woman, now back in the real world and found lying beside the trash bin to the surprise and confusion of café guests and staff, retrieves the comic from the bin and runs home.

She attempts to smooth out the creases of the crumpled pages in order to read what happens next. The next panel shows the hero, lying seemingly lifeless, and the woman begins to cry. However, he then wakes up and tries to break out of his comic-book frames. At the same time, his image appears in the woman's hallway, seemingly torn between real and comic form, hurling himself repeatedly left-and-right against the walls; eventually falling to the floor in his attempts to shatter his two-dimensional barrier. (This scene is largely patterned after a climactic scene in the 1980 film Altered States.) He escapes from the comic book by becoming human, and as he stands up he breaks into a smile. The woman also smiles as she rushes towards him.

The story is concluded in the opening of "The Sun Always Shines on T.V." music video.

==== Awards ====
At the 1986 MTV Video Music Awards, the video for "Take On Me" won six awards—Best New Artist in a Video, Best Concept Video, Most Experimental Video, Best Direction in a Video, Best Special Effects in a Video, and Viewer's Choice—and was nominated for two others, Best Group Video and Video of the Year. It was also nominated for Favorite Pop/Rock Video at the 13th American Music Awards in 1986.

The second music video was produced by Limelight Productions. The crew of the video were director Steve Barron, producer Simon Fields, cinematographer Oliver Stapleton, editor Richard Simpson from Rushes Film Editing, and animators Michael Patterson and Candace Reckinger.

==== Influence ====
The music video and song have often been referred to in cover versions, films, TV programmes and video games. The Family Guy episode "Breaking Out Is Hard to Do" includes a licensed, re-edited version of the video. Volkswagen created a television advertisement inspired by the video. The video was also one of the first to be made into a so-called literal music video. The visuals of the video were used as an homage for Paramore's music video for "Caught in the Middle".

In 2021, Rolling Stone listed "Take On Me" at number 14 on their list of the 100 greatest music videos.

In September 2025, At the BMI London Awards 2025, a-ha's "Take On Me" was among those recognized for reaching 10 million plays on US radio.

The Washington Nationals of Major League Baseball play "Take On Me" during the seventh-inning stretch at Nationals Park, a tradition that arose from former Nationals outfielder Michael Morse using it as his walk-up song.

== Chart performance ==
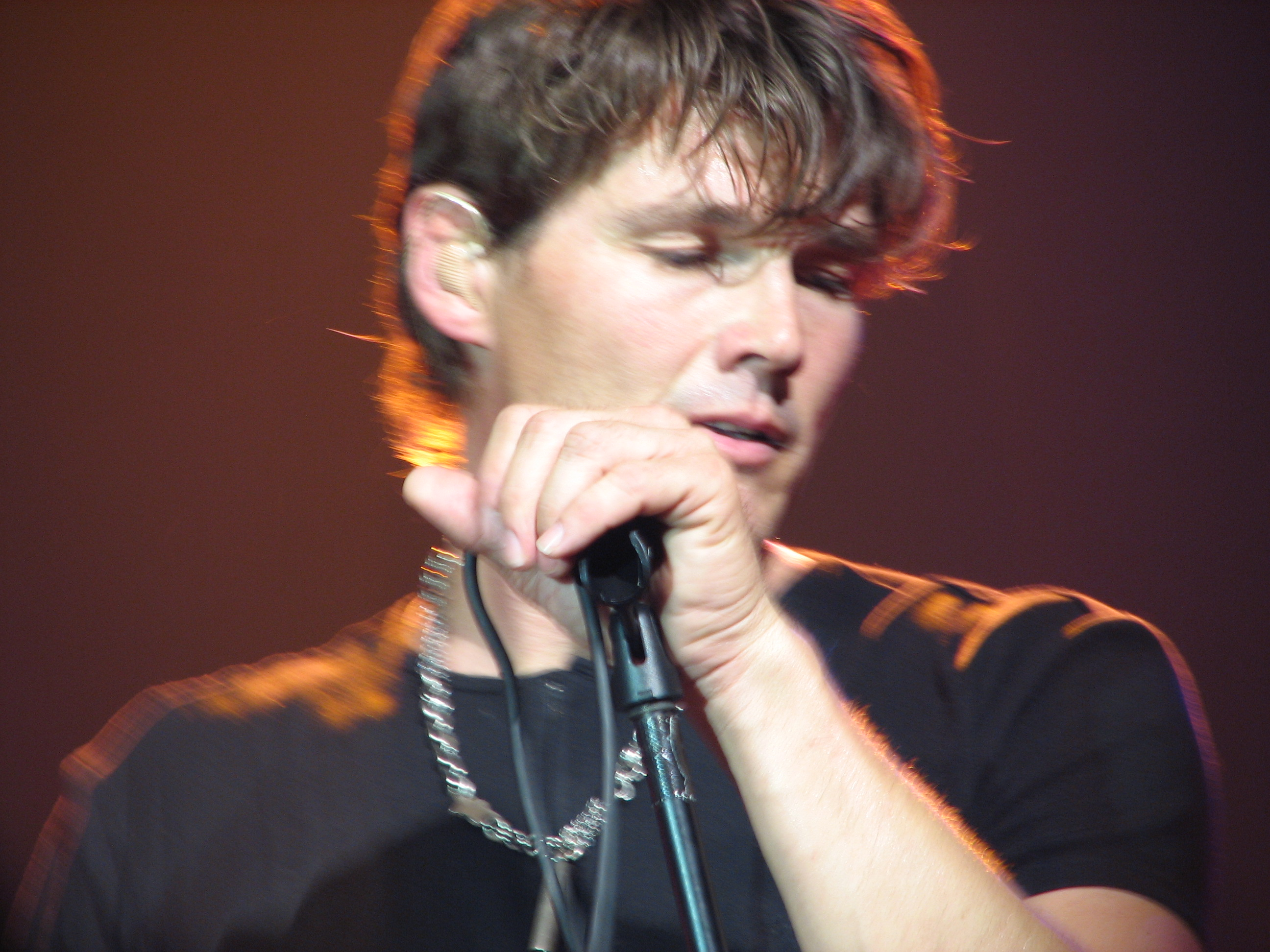
Lead singer Morten Harket performing with A-ha in New York City.

"Take On Me", mixed by Tony Mansfield, was originally released in 1984 but failed to make an impact in the United Kingdom. This release peaked at number 3 in Norway but failed to reach audiences abroad. The group re-recorded the song with the help of producer Alan Tarney, releasing the new version in 1985.

In the United States, Warner Bros. invested in the second video for "Take On Me", which used Tarney's version of the song. The new video was released to dance clubs and television a month before the record was available in stores or played on the radio. Wide exposure on MTV helped propel the single to the top of Billboard's Hot 100, reaching number one in the issue dated 19 October 1985 (its fifteenth week on the chart). It remained on the chart for twenty-seven weeks and ranked ten in the 1985 year-end chart. As of June 2014, the song has sold 1,463,000 digital copies in the US after it became available for download in the digital era. To celebrate 65 years of the Hot 100, in 2023 Billboard staff ranked the 500 Best Pop Songs that graced the chart since 1958, placing the song at number 26.

"Take On Me" was released for the third time in the United Kingdom in September 1985. The record debuted on the UK Singles Chart at number 55 and in late October reached number 2, where it remained for three consecutive weeks, held off the top spot by Britain's biggest single of the year, Jennifer Rush's "The Power of Love". On 1 November 1985, it was certified gold by the British Phonographic Industry (BPI).

In Norway, A-ha's native country, "Take On Me" re-entered the VG-lista singles chart, reaching number one a year after it was first released. The single was largely successful elsewhere, reaching the top of the Eurochart Hot 100 for nine weeks, topping the singles charts in many countries, including Austria, Belgium, Germany, Italy, the Netherlands, Sweden, and Switzerland, and reaching the top three in France and number two in Ireland.

== Release history ==
Region	Date	B-side	Ref.
Norway	19 October 1984 (original version)	"And You Tell Me"	
United Kingdom	5 April 1985	"Love Is Reason"	
United States	17 June 1985	"Love Is Reason"	
United Kingdom	16 September 1985 (re-release)	"Love Is Reason"	

== Track listings ==
7-inch: MCA / MCA-9146 United Kingdom (1984)

1. "Take On Me" (original version) – 3:18
2. "And You Tell Me" – 1:48
- Track 1 is produced by Tony Mansfield and remixed by John Ratcliff with A-ha.

12-inch: MCA / MCA-9146T United Kingdom (1984)

1. "Take On Me" (long version) – 3:46
2. "And You Tell Me" – 1:48
3. "Stop! And Make Your Mind Up" – 2:57
- Track 1 is produced by Tony Mansfield and remixed by John Ratcliff.

7-inch: MCA / MCA-9006 United Kingdom (1985)

1. "Take On Me" (single version) – 3:49
2. "Love Is Reason" – 3:04
- Track 1 is produced by Alan Tarney.
- Track 1 is the same version as the album version.

12-inch: MCA / MCA-9006T United Kingdom (1985)

1. "Take On Me" (extended version) – 4:50
2. "Love Is Reason" (LP version) – 3:04
3. "Take On Me" (single version) – 3:49
- Tracks 1 and 3 are produced by Alan Tarney.
- Track 3 is the same version as the album version.

7-inch: MCA / MCA-29011 United States (1985)

1. "Take On Me" – 3:46
2. "Love Is Reason" – 3:04
- Track 1 is produced by Alan Tarney.
- Track 2 is produced by John Ratcliff with A-ha.

12-inch: Warner Bros. / PRO-A-2291 (Promo) United States (1985)

1. "Take On Me" (long version) – 4:47 (a.k.a. "Extended Version")
2. "Take On Me" (single version) – 3:46
- Tracks 1 and 2 are produced by Alan Tarney.

== Credits and personnel ==
Credits adapted from Sound on Sound.

- Morten Harket – lead vocals
- Magne Furuholmen – Roland Juno-60 and PPG Wave synthesisers, backing vocals
- Pål Waaktaar – guitars, PPG Wave and Yamaha DX7 synthesisers, LinnDrum programming, hi-hat and cymbal, backing vocals
- Neill King – engineering (1984 version)
- Alan Tarney – production
- John Ratcliff – producer and re-mixing (1984 version)
- Barry Grint – mastering

== Charts ==
=== Weekly charts ===
1985–1986 weekly chart performance for "Take On Me"
Chart (1985–1986)	Peak position
Australia (Kent Music Report)	1
Austria (Ö3 Austria Top 40)	1
Belgium (Ultratop 50 Flanders)	1
Canada Top Singles (RPM)	2
Denmark (Tracklisten)	2
Europe (European Hot 100 Singles)	1
Finland (Suomen virallinen lista)	4
France (SNEP)	3
Greece (IFPI)	1
Ireland (IRMA)	2
Italy (Musica e dischi)	1
Netherlands (Dutch Top 40)	1
Netherlands (Single Top 100)	1
New Zealand (Recorded Music NZ)	7
Norway (VG-lista)	1
Quebec (ADISQ)	3
South Africa (Springbok Radio)	7
Spain (AFYVE)	11
Sweden (Sverigetopplistan)	1
Switzerland (Schweizer Hitparade)	1
UK Singles (Official Charts)	2
US Billboard Hot 100	1
US Adult Contemporary (Billboard)	4
US Dance Singles Sales (Billboard)	36
US Cash Box Top 100 Singles	1
West Germany (GfK)	1

2021–2025 weekly chart performance for "Take On Me"
Chart (2021–2026)	Peak position
Global 200 (Billboard)	57
Hungary (Single Top 40)	26
Netherlands Airplay (Radiomonitor)	39
Norway Airplay (IFPI Norge)	65
Poland (Polish Airplay Top 100)	45
Portugal (AFP)	83

=== Year-end charts ===
1985 year-end chart performance for "Take On Me"
Chart (1985)	Position
Australia (Kent Music Report)	12
Belgium (Ultratop 50 Flanders)	46
Canada Top Singles (RPM)	29
Netherlands (Dutch Top 40)	60
Netherlands (Single Top 100)	24
South Africa (SA Singles Charts)	84
UK Singles (Gallup)	9
US Billboard Hot 100	10
US Cash Box Top 100 Singles	15
West Germany (Media Control)	46

1986 year-end chart performance for "Take On Me"
Chart (1986)	Position
Europe (European Hot 100 Singles)	26
West Germany (Media Control)	34
South Africa (SA Singles Charts)	59

2022 year-end chart performance for "Take On Me"
Chart (2022)	Position
Global 200 (Billboard)	139

2023 year-end chart performance for "Take On Me"
Chart (2023)	Position
Global 200 (Billboard)	109

2024 year-end chart performance for "Take On Me"
Chart (2024)	Position
France (SNEP)	190
Global 200 (Billboard)	65
Portugal (AFP)	198

2025 year-end chart performance for "Take On Me"
Chart (2025)	Position
Argentina Anglo Airplay (Monitor Latino)	55
Global 200 (Billboard)	125

== Certifications ==
Certifications for "Take On Me"
Region	Certification	Certified units/sales
Belgium (BRMA)	Gold	100,000
Brazil (Pro-Música Brasil)	Platinum	60,000^{‡}
Denmark (IFPI Danmark)	3× Platinum	270,000^{‡}
France (SNEP)	Gold	500,000^{*}
Germany (BVMI)	Gold	500,000^{^}
Italy (FIMI) 1985–1986 sales	Gold	300,000
Italy (FIMI) since 2009 sales	2× Platinum	200,000^{‡}
Japan (RIAJ)	Gold	100,000^{*}
Netherland	Gold	100,000
New Zealand (RMNZ)	6× Platinum	180,000^{‡}
Portugal (AFP)	5× Platinum	125,000^{‡}
Spain (Promusicae)	3× Platinum	180,000^{‡}
United Kingdom (BPI)	Gold	500,000^{‡}
United Kingdom (BPI) Digital sales since 2004	5× Platinum	3,000,000^{‡}
United States Physical	—	2,000,000
United States Digital	—	1,463,000
^{*} Sales figures based on certification alone.^{^} Shipments figures based on certification alone.^{‡} Sales+streaming figures based on certification alone.

== MTV Unplugged appearance ==
In 2017, A-ha appeared on the television series MTV Unplugged and played and recorded acoustic versions of many of their popular songs for the album MTV Unplugged – Summer Solstice in Giske, Norway, including "Take On Me".

== Reel Big Fish version ==
"Take On Me"

Single by Reel Big Fish

from the album BASEketball and Why Do They Rock So Hard?
- Released: 1998
- Recorded: 1998
- Genre: Ska punk
- Length: 3:14
- Label: Mojo
- Songwriters: Magne Furuholmen; Morten Harket; Pål Waaktaar

Reel Big Fish singles chronology
"Sell Out" (1997)	"Take On Me" (1998)	"Where Have You Been?" (2002)

Music video
- "Take On Me" on YouTube

In 1998, ska punk band Reel Big Fish covered "Take On Me" for the film BASEketball. The song was later released on the BASEketball soundtrack and the international version of their album Why Do They Rock So Hard? The band also performs the song at concerts. Reel Big Fish released a video clip for "Take On Me", directed by Jeff Moore, and features the band playing the song while walking down an aisle in the stadium, and playing a game of BASEketball interlaced with clips from the film. An alternative video for the song's international release that contained only the stadium aisle footage was also released. Reel Big Fish also included a live version of the song in their live album Our Live Album Is Better than Your Live Album and live DVD's You're All in This Together and Reel Big Fish Live! In Concert!

=== Track listing ===
- CD single
1. "Take On Me" – 3:02
2. "Alternative Baby" – 2:56
3. "Why Do All the Girls Think They're Fat?" – 2:22

==== Personnel ====
- Aaron Barrett – celesta, guitar, lead vocals, synthesizer
- Grant Barry – trombone
- Andrew Gonzales – drums
- Scott Klopfenstein – celesta, keyboards, trumpet, vocals
- Dan Regan – screams, trombone
- Tavis Werts – flügelhorn, trumpet
- Matt Wong – bass guitar, vocals

== A1 version ==
"Take On Me"

Single by A1

from the album The A List
- B-side: "I Got Sunshine"
- Released: 28 August 2000
- Length: 3:46
- Label: Columbia
- Songwriters: Magne Furuholmen; Morten Harket; Pål Waaktaar

A1 singles chronology
"Like a Rose" (2000)	"Take On Me" (2000)	"Same Old Brand New You" (2000)

Music video
- "Take On Me" on YouTube

On 28 August 2000, British-Norwegian boy band A1 released a cover of "Take On Me" for their second studio album, The A List. Despite being panned by music critics, who called it a "lame cover version" and a "note for note copy" that seems like "a re-release of the original"; it was commercially successful, topping the charts in the United Kingdom and Norway.

=== Music video ===
The music video was directed by Stuart Gosling. It features A1 entering a computer world by putting on virtual reality glasses after finding out about a deadly computer virus. After flying for a distance, they find the virus and destroy it, saving humanity. The video was inspired by the 1982 live-action science fiction film Tron.

=== Track listings ===
- UK CD1
1. "Take On Me" – 3:31
2. "Beatles Medley (I Feel Fine / She Loves You)" – 3:20
3. "I Got Sunshine" – 3:41
4. A1 multimedia trailers
- UK CD2
1. "Take On Me" (UK 2K Mix) – 3:25
2. "Take On Me" (Metro extended club mix) – 6:02
3. "Take On Me" (D-Bop Saturday Night Mix) – 7:52
4. "Take On Me" (video)
- UK cassette single
1. "Take On Me" – 3:31
2. "I Got Sunshine" – 3:41

=== Charts ===
Weekly charts

Weekly chart performance for "Take On Me"
Chart (2000–2001)	Peak position
Australia (ARIA)	46
Denmark (IFPI)	2
Europe (European Hot 100 Singles)	11
Germany (GfK)	61
Ireland (IRMA)	12
Latvia (Latvijas Top 30)	17
Netherlands (Dutch Top 40 Tipparade)	10
Netherlands (Single Top 100)	47
Norway (VG-lista)	1
Poland Airplay (Music & Media)	15
Romania (Romanian Top 100)	10
Scottish Singles Sales (Official Charts)	1
Spain Airplay (Top 40 Radio)	40
Sweden (Sverigetopplistan)	9
UK Singles (Official Charts)	1
UK Airplay (Music Week)	38

Year-end charts

Year-end chart performance for "Take On Me"
Chart (2000)	Position
Norway Høst Period Singles (VG-lista)	4
Romania (Romanian Top 100)	83
Sweden (Hitlistan)	77
UK Singles (OCC)	59

==== Certifications ====
Certifications for "Take On Me"
Region	Certification	Certified units/sales
Norway (IFPI Norway)	Gold	
United Kingdom (BPI)	Silver	200,000^{^}
^{^} Shipments figures based on certification alone.

== Other versions ==
On 27 August 2015, fellow Norwegian musician Kygo released a remixed version via iTunes to help promote the rollout of the Apple Music streaming service. His version foregoes the iconic keyboard riffs and instead features a new one. The style of his version has been described as tropical house. As of April 2021, the song has amassed more than 15 million listens on YouTube and 36 million listens on Spotify. The remix preserves Harket's original vocals (albeit with processing effects and a different arrangement).

In the 2015 video game Metal Gear Solid V: The Phantom Pain, a cassette of "Take On Me" can be obtained as a secret collectible.

A version of this song was performed on the series finale, "Chuck vs. The Goodbye", of the television show Chuck which aired on 27 January 2012. The song was performed by Scott Krinsky and Vik Sahay of "Jeffster" – a fictional band consisting of their characters Jeffrey Barnes ("Jeff-", for Jeffrey), portrayed by Krinsky, and Lester Patel ("-ster", for Lester), portrayed by Sahay.

A cover by D. A. Wallach was featured in the film La La Land. Wallach makes an appearance as the lead singer of a 1980s pop cover band that features Sebastian Wilder, one of the film's two protagonists. The cover was released as part of the album La La Land: The Complete Musical Experience.

American rock band Weezer included a cover version of the song in their 2019 covers compilation The Teal Album. An accompanying music video was released on 12 February 2019, in which rock band Calpurnia—led by frontman Finn Wolfhard ("Mike" in the Netflix original series Stranger Things) who also plays a younger version of Weezer's own frontman, Rivers Cuomo—performs the cover. The video, set in 1985 in the "Cuomo Residence", shows Wolfhard (as Cuomo) and the rest of Calpurnia, lip-syncing to the song while "rehearsing" it in the residence's living room; the video features camera work that pays homage to the original video by a-ha. Near the end of the video, Wolfhard is shown sitting at a desk in his bedroom, scribbling possible names for his new band on a page of a notebook (the name Weezer is shown as option No.3). He then turns the page to draw what would become Weezer's band logo. The video also features some scenes of Calpurnia playing, filmed with the rotoscoping technique that made the original a-ha video famous. The cover version, set a semitone lower than the original version (i.e. A-flat major), was also used in the closing scene of The SpongeBob Movie: Sponge on the Run, wherein Bikini Bottom was turned into a "sea snail refuge".

On 11 October 2019, the Dutch DJs Lucas & Steve released "Perfect", a single that greatly adopts on the music of "Take On Me". The single features on the vocals of the Dutch X Factor fifth season winner Haris Alagic known by the mononym Haris. Released on Spinnin' Records in the EDM and deephouse style, it was accompanied by an official music video. The song was greatly successful on the Dutch Singles Chart as well as on the Polish Airplay Chart and also appeared on the Tipparade of the Belgian chart. There was a successful "Perfect (LUM!X Remix)" released.

In a scene in the video game The Last of Us Part II (2020), an acoustic version of "Take On Me" is played, sung by Ashley Johnson. In the second season episode of HBO’s The Last of Us, Day One, an acoustic version of the song is sung by Bella Ramsey.

The song "Feel This Moment", performed by American rapper Pitbull featuring American singer Christina Aguilera, samples the instrumental riff of "Take On Me".

The debut single of K-pop boygroup Zerobaseone, "In Bloom", samples "Take On Me".

Upon release, the song "Blinding Lights" by the Weeknd has been frequently compared to "Take On Me", including by both the Weeknd and Morten Harket himself, although the song contains no direct samples or cover elements.

The song is also heard in the Universal Pictures Despicable Me 3 & The Super Mario Bros. Movie.

== Bibliography ==
- Fiske, John (1994). Reading the Popular. Routledge. ISBN 0-415-07875-X.
- Keating, Jody; Pizer, Tom (2002). Inside Flash. New Riders. ISBN 0-7357-1105-4.
