= The Long Run (song) =

1979 song by The Eagles

Single by Eagles

from the album The Long Run
- B-side: "The Disco Strangler"
- Released: November 27, 1979
- Genre: Pop rock
- Length: 3:42
- Label: Asylum
- Songwriter(s): Don Henley; Glenn Frey
- Producer(s): Bill Szymczyk

Eagles singles chronology
"Heartache Tonight" (1979)	"The Long Run" (1979)	"I Can't Tell You Why" (1980)

"The Long Run" is a song written by Don Henley and Glenn Frey and recorded by American rock band the Eagles. The sound of the song is viewed as a tribute to the Stax / Memphis rhythm and blues sound. It was the title track of their album The Long Run and was released as a single in November 1979. It reached No. 8 on the U.S. Billboard Hot 100 in early 1980. It was the second of three singles released from The Long Run album, preceded by "Heartache Tonight," which reached No. 1 on the Billboard Hot 100 in November 1979, and followed by "I Can't Tell You Why," which also reached No. 8 on the Billboard Hot 100, in the spring of 1980.

== Composition ==
According to Don Henley, "The Long Run" was written in part as a response to press articles that said the Eagles were "passé" as disco was then dominant and punk emerging, inspiring lines such as "Who is gonna make it/ We'll find out in the long run". He also said that irony was part of the inspiration, as the song is about longevity and posterity while the group "was breaking apart, imploding under the pressure of trying to deliver a worthy follow-up to Hotel California".

== Reception ==
Billboard describes "the Long Run" as "a midtempo rocker with a rather straightforward rhythmic delivery and a catchy lyrical hook towards the end." Billboard also praised the "tight, well crafted orchestration. Cash Box said that the song is an "upbeat cut" but that "Don Henley's raspy vocals suggest subtle tension with the theme of survival." Record World praised "Henley's affecting vocals." In his book The Heart of Rock & Soul: The 1001 Greatest Singles Ever Made, music critic Dave Marsh called the song a complete ripoff of the 1972 R&B record "Tryin' to Live My Life Without You".

== Music video ==
A music video was produced from the song, featuring the band playing in a staged recording session. The line-up was the same as the studio version, except that Joe Vitale plays the Hammond organ in place of Don Felder, and no electric piano is featured.

== Personnel ==
- Don Henley: lead vocals, drums
- Glenn Frey: rhythm guitar, backing vocals
- Joe Walsh: slide guitar, backing vocals
- Don Felder: slide guitar, Hammond organ, backing vocals
- Timothy B. Schmit: bass guitar, backing vocals
- Joe Vitale: electric piano

== Chart performance ==
=== Weekly charts ===
Chart (1979–1980)	Peak position
Canadian RPM Top Singles	9
Canadian RPM Adult Oriented Playlist	9
New Zealand Singles Chart	30
UK Singles Chart	66
US Billboard Hot 100	8
US Billboard Adult Contemporary	34
US Cash Box Top 100	10

=== Year-end charts ===
Chart (1980)	Rank
Canada RPM Top Singles	62
US Billboard Hot 100	81
US Cash Box	72

== Cover versions ==
- American band Reel Big Fish recorded their own rendition of the song for their 2009 album Fame, Fortune and Fornication.

== Popular culture ==
- The song was featured on the TV show WKRP in Cincinnati on the episode "The Doctor's Daughter". Specifically, Dr. Johnny Fever decides to air the recording and his programming director Andy Travis is hysterical with delight that his popular DJ is playing a then-hit record for once.
