= Transition (band) =

English rock indie band

Transition (Chinese: 前進樂團) is an English rock indie band from Bristol. They lend their style to the influence of U2, Radiohead and Jeff Buckley, and were voted amongst the Top Ten Bands in the UK on Channel 4's Slash Music Showcase. Transition is made up of the brothers Jesse Edbrooke (guitarist) and Josh Edbrooke (drummer) together with Niall Dunne (guitarist). In 2009, the band relocated to Taiwan.

The band has released seven albums and are distributed by Corridor Records in the UK and WWR in Asia. Their release, Three Bridges (2008), received a nine out of ten rating from Cross Rhythms UK.

The band has a fan base largely based in Asia, having performed in the UK, Sweden, Taiwan (where the band played at the Spring Scream (春天吶喊) and Formoz (野台開唱) music festivals), Korea and Hong Kong. In 2008, the band played at Bay Beats from 29 to 30 August, an indie music festival in Singapore. They were the final act on the Nokia Arena at the Esplanade on the last day of the festival. Most recently, they stayed in Taipei, Taiwan for over six months.

Jesse and Josh were interviewed by DGSChapter, and most recently, they performed in Trafalgar Square as part of the Chinese New Year festivities 2018.

== Discography ==
Year	Album
2000	Can't Keep Away
2002	Little Known Classics
2004	New Space
2004	Tectonic Friction
2005	Openhanded And Undetected
2006	The Seaton Sessions
2008	Three Bridges
2009	"Borderlands"
2013	"跨越-Kua Yue(Step Over)" Chinese Album
