= Monkeys for Nothin' and the Chimps for Free =

Studio album by Reel Big Fish
- Released: July 10, 2007
- Recorded: Recording Began on March 1, 2007
- Studios: Music Inc. Studios; Orange, California, United States
- Genre: Ska punk
- Length: 57:03
- Label: Rock Ridge
- Producer: Aaron Barrett

Reel Big Fish chronology
Duet All Night Long (2007)	Monkeys for Nothin' and the Chimps for Free (2007)	Fame, Fortune and Fornication (2009)

Reel Big Fish studio chronology
We're Not Happy 'til You're Not Happy (2005)	Monkeys for Nothin' and the Chimps for Free (2007)	Fame, Fortune and Fornication (2009)

Singles from Monkeys for Nothin' and the Chimps for Free
- 1. "Party Down" Released: 2007; 2. "Slow Down" Released: 2007

Professional ratings
Review scores
Source	Rating
AllMusic	4/5 stars
About.com	4/5 stars
IGN	7/10
Melodic	3/5 stars
Punknews	3.5/5 stars
ReadJunk	4.5/5 stars
Q	1/5 stars

Monkeys for Nothin' and the Chimps for Free is the sixth studio album from Reel Big Fish, their first studio album after being dropped by Jive Records and their final album with bassist Matt Wong.

The CD is accompanied with a 22-minute DVD of the "Making of Monkeys for Nothin' and the Chimps for Free". According to the documentary, this album was originally proposed as a fourth disc to the band's live album, but the band had decided they had enough live material and so decided to do this album as a compilation of B-sides and re-recordings alongside some new songs. This documentary also contains footage of the band mixing a song which does not appear on the final album, about 20 minutes into the video. The song would later be released (without vocals) as a bonus track for A Best of Us for the Rest of Us.

The title is a pun on the line "Money for nothin' and your chicks for free" from the Dire Straits song "Money for Nothing."

== Release ==
In March and April 2007, Reel Big Fish went on a tour of Australia. On May 4, 2007, Monkeys for Nothin' and the Chimps for Free was announced for released in two months' time. Thirteen days later, "I'm Her Man" was posted on the band's Myspace profile. They then toured Europe until June, which included appearances at the Download and Slam Dunk Festivals. "Party Down" was released to radio on June 26; two days later, bassist Matt Wong left the band to focus on family, and was replaced by Derek Gibbs. Monkeys for Nothin' and the Chimps for Free was released through Rock Ridge Music on July 10, 2007. Three days later, a music video was released for "Party Down", directed by Tyler Trautman.

In July and August 2007, the band went on a co-headlining US tour with Less Than Jake, with support from Streetlight Manifesto and Against All Authority. In December 2007, they supported Less Than Jake on their headlining tour of Australia. Coinciding with this trek, Monkeys for Nothin' and the Chimps for Free was released on vinyl. Between January and March 2008, the band embarked on a European tour with Streetlight Manifesto. In April 2008, the band appeared at the Bamboozle Left festival. Between June and August 2008, the band performed on the Warped Tour.

== Track listing ==
All tracks are written by Aaron Barrett, except as noted.

Monkeys
No.	Title	Writer(s)	Length
1.	"Party Down"		4:08
2.	"Another F.U. Song"		1:04
3.	"Live Your Dream"		3:13
4.	"My Imaginary Friend"		3:24
5.	"Slow Down"		5:04
6.	"The New Version of You"		3:23
7.	"Will the Revolution Come?"		2:22
8.	"Another Day in Paradise" (Phil Collins cover)	Phil Collins	2:41
9.	"Everybody's Drunk" (contains melody to Twisted Sister's "We're Not Gonna Take It")	Barrett, Dee Snider	3:07
10.	"Please Don't Tell Her I Have a Girlfriend"		2:57

Chimps
No.	Title	Writer(s)	Rerecording of track that originally appeared	Length
11.	"Way Back"		Japanese release of We're Not Happy 'Til You're Not Happy	2:41
12.	"Hate You"		Everything Sucks	2:59
13.	"Call You"		Everything Sucks	3:12
14.	"Why Do All Girls Think They're Fat?"		Buy This!, Everything Sucks	2:33
15.	"I'm Her Man"		Everything Sucks	4:11
16.	"Til I Hit the Ground"		Return of the Mullet	3:48
17.	"Cannibal"	Barrett, Dan Regan	Previously unreleased track	6:16

Bonus tracks from iTunes and vinyl release
No.	Title	Writer(s)	Length
18.	"Bang! The Mouse Explodes"		3:28
19.	"Cannibal (Dance Mix)"	Barrett, Regan	4:13

On the back cover of the album, tracks 1 through 10 are credited as "Monkeys" while tracks 11 through 17 are credited as "Chimps." The Chimps section of the album consists of re-recordings.

The band's MySpace page indicates that 19 songs were recorded during the sessions, leaving 2 songs that will not appear on the store-bought album. One of these, "Bang! The Mouse Explodes," is available on the iTunes and vinyl releases of the album. Portions of the 19th track can be heard on the DVD packaged with the CD. This 19th song would eventually be stripped of its vocals and released as a digital bonus track with A Best of Us for the Rest of Us.

== Personnel ==
Reel Big Fish

- Aaron Barrett - lead guitar, lead vocals
- John Christianson - Trumpet
- Scott Klopfenstein - Trumpet, vocals, keyboards, additional guitar on "Party Down"
- Dan Regan - Trombone
- Ryland Steen - drums
- Matt Wong - Bass guitar

Additional musicians

- Molly Barrett - Southern belle on "I'm Her Man"
- David Irish - Group vocals, additional cursing on "Another F.U. Song"
- Brian Klemm - Guitar solo fighter on "I'm Her Man" and additional cursing on "Another F.U. Song"
- Jon Kubis - Accordion on "Please Don't Tell Her I Have a Girlfriend"
- Kiersten Stevens - Rape Whistle on "Everybody's Drunk"

Production

- Evren Göknar - mastering

== Charts ==
Chart (2007)	Peak position
US Billboard 200	106
US Independent Albums (Billboard)	13
