= Everything Sucks (Reel Big Fish album) =

Studio album by Reel Big Fish
- Released: May 5, 1995; 2000 (re-release)
- Recorded: 1994–95
- Studio: Sound Art Studios, Huntington Beach, CA
- Genre: Ska punk
- Length: 62:54
- Label: Piss Off; Mojo/Jive (reissue)
- Producer: Zack Shutt

Reel Big Fish chronology
Buy This! (1994)	Everything Sucks (1995)	Turn the Radio Off (1996)

Professional ratings
Review scores
Source	Rating
AllMusic	4/5 stars
Punknews.org	4/5 stars

Everything Sucks is Reel Big Fish's first full-length studio album. It was recorded at Sound Art Studios in 1994 and 1995, and released in 1995 on Reel Big Fish's independent label Piss Off Records. The album was engineered by John Gregorius.

An EP version of the album was released by Mojo Records after Reel Big Fish released Turn the Radio Off in 1996. The full album was re-released by Mojo in January 2000, with a slightly altered track list, and the music video for the song "Everything Sucks", able to be viewed through a computer's CD-ROM drive. The original album is long out of print, and highly sought after by Reel Big Fish fans. The original release features an alternate version of "S.R." and refers to bands such as The Nuckle Brothers, No Doubt, and Sublime; it is not included on the Mojo release.

Most of the songs on this record were recorded when Reel Big Fish was still maturing as a band (some members were still in high school). The majority of the tracks were rerecorded for Turn the Radio Off, Why Do They Rock So Hard, and Monkeys for Nothin' and the Chimps For Free. "Spin The Globe" had been recorded earlier, on their demo In The Good Old Days..., and a few other songs were rerecorded from their 1994 demos Buy This! and Return of the Mullet. The only songs from this album that have not yet appeared on any other Reel Big Fish album are "Boyfriend," "Fo' Head," "Jig," "Go Away" and "Super Hero #5." The song on Turn The Radio Off entitled "Everything Sucks" was named after this album.

The child on the album cover is bassist Matt Wong's younger sister.

== Track listing ==
All songs written by Aaron Barrett, except where noted.

1. "I'm Cool" – 1:43
2. "Join the Club" (Barrett, Tavis Werts) – 3:11
3. "Call You" – 3:04
4. "Hate You" – 3:27
5. "I'll Never Be" (Barrett, Andrew Gonzales, Adam Polakoff) – 4:05
6. "Boyfriend" (Dada Oboe, Issac Guzman) – 3:49
7. "Fo' Head" – 2:04
8. "Trendy" (Barrett, Matt Wong) – 3:25
9. "Skatanic" (Barrett, Gonzales, Werts, Wong) – 3:13
10. "Why Do All Girls Think They're Fat?" – 2:21
11. "Say 'Ten'" – 2:22
12. "I Want Your Girlfriend to Be My Girlfriend Too" – 3:17
13. "Jig" – 1:37
14. "Go Away" – 1:16
15. "Beer" – 3:40
16. "Snoop Dog, Baby" (Barrett, Gonzales, Werts) – 3:32
17. "Big Fuckin' Star" – 3:12
18. "Fuck Yourself" – 2:45
19. "Spin the Globe" – 4:21
20. "I'm Her Man" – 3:48
21. "Super Hero #5" – 3:30

Track 19 is a hidden track on the 1995 version. It is only listed on the 2000 re-issue. Tracks 20 and 21 are only included in the 2000 re-issue.

=== EP Version ===
1. Join the Club
2. I'll Never Be
3. Beer
4. Why Do All Girls Think They're Fat?
5. Call You
6. Go Away

== Personnel ==
Reel Big Fish

- Aaron Barrett – guitar, vocals
- Matt Wong – bass
- Andrew Gonzales – drums
- Dan Regan – trombone
- Tavis Werts – trumpet
- Robert Quimby – trombone
- Adam Polakoff – saxophone

Production

- Zack Shutt – executive producer
- Patrick McDowell – A&R
- Adam Redner – art direction, design
- John Gregorious – engineer, mixing
- Kristine Ripley – art direction, design
- Lisa Johnson – photography
