= Fame, Fortune and Fornication =

Studio album by Reel Big Fish
- Released: January 20, 2009
- Studio: Music Inc. Orange, California
- Genre: Ska punk
- Length: 28:34
- Label: Rock Ridge
- Producer: Aaron Barrett

Reel Big Fish chronology
Monkeys for Nothin' and the Chimps for Free (2007)	Fame, Fortune and Fornication (2009)	A Best of Us... For the Rest of Us (2010)

Reel Big Fish studio chronology
Monkeys for Nothin' and the Chimps for Free (2007)	Fame, Fortune and Fornication (2009)	Candy Coated Fury (2012)

Singles from Fame, Fortune and Fornication
- 1. "Monkey Man" Released: 2009

Professional ratings
Review scores
Source	Rating
AllMusic	2.5/5 stars
Bombshellzine.com	2/10 stars

Fame, Fortune and Fornication is a cover album by ska punk band Reel Big Fish.

== Release ==
In September 2008, they went on a Canadian tour with Less Than Jake, the Flatliners, and the Real Deal. On October 16, 2008, the band announced that they would release their next album in January 2009. Four days later, the band announced that their next album would be titled Fame, Fortune and Fornication and consist of covers. On November 19, 2008, the album's artwork was posted online. From the beginning of January to mid-March 2009, the band went on tour with Streetlight Manifesto, Tip the Van, and One Pin Short. The album was released on January 20, 2009 through Rock Ridge Music. The album's cover features Suburban Legends' guitarist Brian Klemm in hair metal attire, as he appears on the cover of Suburban Legends' 2008 album, Let's Be Friends and Slay the Dragon Together. The vinyl edition of the album was released on March 24, 2009. In July and August 2009, the band went on a US tour with the Beat and the Supervillains. In December 2009 and January 2010, the band went on a West Coast tour, prior to shows in Russia. After this, they embarked on a UK tour, followed by a stint in mainland Europe. They then visited Australia as part of the Soundwave festival in February and March 2010. Following this, the band appeared at the Extreme Thing festival.

== Track listing ==
No.	Title	Original artist	Length
1.	"Nothin' But a Good Time"	Poison	3:03
2.	"Mama We're All Crazy Now"	Slade	2:16
3.	"Veronica Sawyer"	Edna's Goldfish	3:26
4.	"Authority Song"	John Mellencamp	2:57
5.	"Brown Eyed Girl"	Van Morrison	3:03
6.	"The Long Run"	Eagles	3:37
7.	"Won't Back Down"	Tom Petty	3:09
8.	"Keep a Cool Head"	Desmond Dekker	2:12
9.	"Monkey Man"	Toots and the Maytals (The Specials arrangement)	2:29
10.	"Talk Dirty to Me"	Poison	3:42
11.	"Twist and Crawl" (iTunes bonus track)	The English Beat	2:35

== Personnel ==
Reel Big Fish

- Aaron Barrett - Lead guitar, lead vocals
- John Christianson - Trumpet
- Derek Gibbs - Bass guitar
- Scott Klopfenstein - Trumpet, vocals
- Dan Regan - Trombone
- Ryland Steen - Drums

Additional musicians

- Tatiana DeMaria of TAT - Female vocals on "Talk Dirty To Me"
- Brian Klemm of Suburban Legends - Gang vocals
- David Irish - Percussion

Production

- Evren Göknar - mastering

== Charts ==
Chart (2009)	Peak position
US Billboard 200	177
US Independent Albums (Billboard)	26
