= Candy Coated Fury =

Studio album by Reel Big Fish
- Released: July 31, 2012
- Recorded: March 21–June 1, 2012
- Studios: Music Inc. Studios, Orange, CA
- Genre: Ska punk
- Length: 54:56
- Label: Rock Ridge
- Producer: Aaron Barrett

Reel Big Fish chronology
| Skacoustic (2011) | Candy Coated Fury (2012) | Happy Skalidays (2014) |

Reel Big Fish studio chronology
| Fame, Fortune and Fornication (2009) | Candy Coated Fury (2012) | Life Sucks...Let's Dance! (2018) |

Professional ratings
Review scores
| Source | Rating |
|---|---|
| AllMusic | 3.5/5 stars |

Candy Coated Fury is the eighth studio album by the American ska punk band Reel Big Fish, released on July 31, 2012. The cover art was made by artist Thom Foolery. The album was recorded at the band's personal studio in Orange, California.

The album features guest vocals from Coolie Ranx, Brian Klemm, Julie Stoyer, and members of Sonic Boom Six. Aaron Barrett said that when writing the album, he was "very conscious this time about how danceable the songs were and how they make you move when you listen to them. It had been a long time since I really thought about the danceability of our songs."

On June 6, 2012, the band released a teaser video for the album. On June 12, 2012, the band released the song "I Know You Too Well To Like You Anymore" on their YouTube channel days after the song premiered on the Ska Parade radio show on KUKQ. The album was released July 31, 2012, and was sold in a limited quantity at several venues on the Summer of Ska Tour 2012. The album debuted at No. 80 on the Billboard 200.

== Track listing ==
All tracks are written by Aaron Barrett, except where noted

| No. | Title | Writer(s) | Length |
|---|---|---|---|
| 1. | "Everyone Else Is an Asshole" | | 4:11 |
| 2. | "Punisher" | | 4:00 |
| 3. | "She's Not the End of the World" | | 3:42 |
| 4. | "Don't Let Me Down Gently" (see notes ^{4a}) | Martin Gilks, Miles Hunt, Rob Jones, Malcolm Treece | 2:25 |
| 5. | "I Know You Too Well to Like You Anymore" | | 4:25 |
| 6. | "Hiding in My Headphones" | Barrett, Paul Barnes, Coolie Ranx | 4:47 |
| 7. | "I Dare You to Break My Heart" | Barrett, Ryland Steen | 5:15 |
| 8. | "Your Girlfriend Sucks" | | 3:30 |
| 9. | "Don't Stop Skankin'" (see notes ^{9a}) | | 3:59 |
| 10. | "Famous Last Words" | | 3:50 |
| 11. | "Lost Cause" | | 4:20 |
| 12. | "I Love/You Suck" | | 3:13 |
| 13. | "P.S. I Hate You" | Barrett, John Christianson | 4:05 |
| 14. | "The Promise" (see notes ^{14a}) | Clive Farrington, Andrew Mann, Michael Floreale | 3:14 |

Notes
^(4a) Originally performed by The Wonder Stuff
^(9a) Actually 2:44. Then hidden track "Oh, Rudy" (1:15) starts right after.
^(14a) Originally performed by When in Rome

== Personnel ==
Reel Big Fish

- Aaron Barrett – guitar, lead vocals
- Dan Regan – trombone, vocals
- John Christianson – trumpet, vocals
- Ryland Steen – drums, percussion, vocals
- Derek Gibbs – bass guitar, vocals
- Matt Appleton – harmony vocals, tenor saxophone, baritone saxophone, organ

Additional musicians

- Coolie Ranx – vocals on "Hiding in My Headphones"
- Julie Stoyer – vocals on "I Know You Too Well to Like You Anymore" and "Oh, Rudy'"
- Laila Khan – vocals on "Hiding in My Headphones"
- James SK Wān – vocals on "Hiding in My Headphones"
- Barney Boom (Paul Barnes) – vocals on "Hiding in My Headphones"
- Brian Klemm – vocals on "Your Girlfriend Sucks"

== Charts ==
| Chart (2012) | Peak position |
|---|---|
| UK Independent Albums (Official Charts) | 24 |
| US Billboard 200 | 91 |
| US Independent Albums (Billboard) | 14 |
| US Indie Store Album Sales (Billboard) | 22 |
| US Top Alternative Albums (Billboard) | 21 |
| US Top Current Album Sales (Billboard) | 80 |
| US Top Rock Albums (Billboard) | 33 |
