= Why Do They Rock So Hard? =

Studio album by Reel Big Fish
- Released: October 20, 1998
- Studio: Sunset Sound Recorders and Music Grinder Studios - Hollywood, CA.
- Genre: Ska punk
- Length: 73:52
- Label: Mojo
- Producer: Reel Big Fish; John Avila

Reel Big Fish chronology
Keep Your Receipt EP (1997)	Why Do They Rock So Hard? (1998)	Viva La Internet/Blank CD (2000)

Reel Big Fish studio chronology
Turn the Radio Off (1996)	Why Do They Rock So Hard? (1998)	Cheer Up! (2002)

Singles from Why Do They Rock So Hard?
- 1. "Take On Me" Released: 1998; 2. "The Set Up (You Need This)" Released: 1998; 3. "Somebody Hates Me" Released: 1998; 4. "The Kids Don't Like It" Released: 1999

Professional ratings
Review scores
Source	Rating
AllMusic	4/5 stars
Punktastic	5/5 stars

Why Do They Rock So Hard? is the third full-length studio album by the ska punk band Reel Big Fish, released on October 20, 1998, under Mojo Records. This is the only Reel Big Fish studio album where the band line-up has not changed from the previous album.

Aaron Barrett has said in two interviews that this was his favorite album until the release of Our Live Album Is Better than Your Live Album. The album was mixed at Scream Studios by Tim Palmer.

== Track listing ==
All songs written and arranged by Reel Big Fish, except where noted.

No.	Title	Writer(s)	Length
1.	"Somebody Hates Me"		3:28
2.	"Brand New Song" (see notes ^{2a})		3:04
3.	"She's Famous Now"		3:05
4.	"You Don't Know"		3:26
5.	"The Set Up (You Need This)"		4:22
6.	"Thank You for Not Moshing" (see notes ^{6a})		2:41
7.	"I'm Cool"		3:20
8.	"I Want Your Girlfriend to Be My Girlfriend Too"		2:53
9.	"Everything Is Cool"		3:07
10.	"Song #3" (see notes ^{10a})	Reel Big Fish, Coolie Ranx	3:28
11.	"Scott's a Dork"		3:04
12.	"Big Star"		3:34
13.	"The Kids Don't Like It"		3:20
14.	"Down in Flames"		4:49
15.	"We Care"		3:55
16.	"Victory Over Peter Bones"	Reel Big Fish, John Avila	5:25
17.	"The Legend of Alan Guile Versus Peter Bones" (see notes ^{17a})		16:51

Notes
^(2a) A cover of the A-ha song "Take On Me" (2:54) appears on some international releases in between "Somebody Hates Me" and "Brand New Song".
^(6a) Titled "In the Pit" on subsequent albums.
^(10a) On the clean version of this album, "Song #3" is stripped of its vocal track and called "Sleep All Day".
^(17a) Hidden track; begins with 5:20 silence. On the Japanese release, a cover of the Duran Duran song "Hungry Like the Wolf" (3:39) appears in place of this track.

== Personnel ==
Reel Big Fish

- Aaron Barrett – guitar, lead vocals, synthesizer, celesta
- Grant Barry – trombone
- Andrew Gonzales – drums
- Scott Klopfenstein – trumpet, vocals, keyboards, Celesta
- Dan Regan – trombone, screams
- Tavis Werts – trumpet, flügelhorn
- Matt Wong – bass guitar, vocals

Additional musicians

- Coolie Ranx (Pilfers) – vocals on tracks 6 & 10
- Brandon Werts – percussion
- Sam Avila – organ
- John Avila – piano
- True: 129 – scratching
- Jay Gordon – backing vocals

Production

- Tim Palmer – mixing
- Joe Zook – mixing
- Jay Rifkin – executive producer
- Steve Baughman – engineer
- Jay Gordon – engineer
- Steve Gamberoni – engineer
- Jenny O. – art direction
- Dave Holdredge – digital editing
- David Holdrege – digital editing
- John Avila – producer, mixing
- Donnell Cameron – engineer, mixing
- Kevin Dean – engineer
- Lisa Johnson – photography

== Charts ==
Chart performance for Why Do They Rock So Hard?
Chart (1999)	Peak position
Australian Albums (ARIA)	54
US Billboard 200	67
