= Life Sucks...Let's Dance! =

Studio album by Reel Big Fish
- Released: December 21, 2018
- Studios: Pot of Gold Studio; Orange, California
- Genre: Ska punk
- Length: 44:32
- Label: Rock Ridge
- Producer: Aaron Barrett

Reel Big Fish chronology
Happy Skalidays (2014)	Life Sucks...Let's Dance! (2018)

Reel Big Fish studio chronology
Candy Coated Fury (2012)	Life Sucks...Let's Dance! (2018)

Singles from Life Sucks...Let's Dance!
- 1. "You Can't Have All of Me" Released: October 12, 2018

Life Sucks...Let's Dance! is the ninth studio album by American ska punk band Reel Big Fish, released on December 21, 2018, through Rock Ridge Music. It is their first album since 2012's Candy Coated Fury. It is supported by the lead single "You Can't Have All of Me".

== Recording ==
The band began working on the album in January 2018 at engineer David Irish's recently built Pot of Gold Studio in Orange, California. Frontman Aaron Barrett stated that "Recording the album with this lineup was really fun" and the album will have a "little pissed off-ness in there and some sarcastic, funny lyrics as usual [...] Also, I just got married, so there might be a few sappy love songs on the album, too. Yuck!"

Trumpet player John Christianson also said to fans about the album that "We're going to make you laugh, we're going to make you dance, we're going to make you raise your middle finger. We're going to make you forget about your problems and live."

== Track listing ==
All tracks are written by Aaron Barrett, except where noted.

No.	Title	Writer(s)	Length
1.	"Life Sucks... Let's Dance!"		2:46
2.	"Pissed Off"		2:58
3.	"You Can't Have All of Me"	Matt Appleton, Daniel Tieger, Aaron Barrett	2:44
4.	"In Love Again"		3:31
5.	"Tongue Tied and Tipsy Too"		1:46
6.	"Bleached Thang, Baby"		4:46
7.	"Another Beer Song"		2:05
8.	"Bob Marley's Toe"		2:33
9.	"Ska Show" (The Forces of Evil cover)		3:15
10.	"The Good Old Days" (The Forces of Evil cover)		3:40
11.	"G.D. Beautiful Day"		3:23
12.	"I Should Know by Now"		2:56
13.	"I'd Rather Get It Wrong"		3:40
14.	"Walter's Highlife"		4:12
Total length:			44:32

== Personnel ==
- Aaron Barrett - guitar, vocals
- John Christianson - trumpet
- Derek Gibbs - bass
- Matt Appleton - saxophone, baritone saxophone, vocals
- Billy Kottage - trombone, Hammond B3, Fender Rhodes, upright piano
- Ed Smokey Beach - drums, percussion
- David Irish - vocals

== Charts ==
Chart (2018)	Peak position
UK Independent Albums (Official Charts)	37
US Independent Albums (Billboard)	26
