= Cheer Up! (Reel Big Fish album) =

Studio album by Reel Big Fish
- Released: June 25, 2002
- Recorded: 2000–2002
- Studios: World Class Audio (Anaheim, California); The Sound Factory (Hollywood, California); Jakes Place (Studio City, California); Paramount (Hollywood, California); Sony Music (Santa Monica, California); Grand Masters (Hollywood, California); Brando's Paradise (San Gabriel, California)
- Genres: Pop-punk; ska punk; power pop; rock
- Length: 62:58
- Labels: Mojo; Jive
- Producers: Val Garay; Aaron Barrett; Scott Klopfenstein; Gordie Johnson

Reel Big Fish chronology
Favorite Noise (2002)	Cheer Up! (2002)	We're Not Happy 'til You're Not Happy (2005)

Reel Big Fish studio chronology
Why Do They Rock So Hard? (1998)	Cheer Up! (2002)	We're Not Happy 'til You're Not Happy (2005)

Singles from Cheer Up!
- 1. "Where Have You Been?" Released: June 10, 2002

Cheer Up! is the fourth studio album by American rock band Reel Big Fish. Released on June 25, 2002, the album was the band's first after the turn of the new millennium, following the release of 1998's Why Do They Rock So Hard? With the advent of the 2000s, and following the band's mainstream success during the third wave of ska, the marketability of and interest in ska waned; despite this, Reel Big Fish continued to tour successfully and maintain a significant fan base while recording Cheer Up! across a number of different recording studios in California. Val Garay produced the majority of the tracks, with frontman Aaron Barrett, trumpeter Scott Klopfenstein and Gordie Johnson producing select songs.

Cheer Up! received generally favorable reviews from critics, some of which praised the inclusion of other styles and genres into the band's sound. It reached number 115 in the United States, number 46 in Australia and number 96 in the United Kingdom; "Where Have You Been?" peaked at number 76 in the UK. Cheer Up! has been described as belonging to the pop-punk and power pop genres, and tackles the theme of heartbreak. "Where Have You Been?" was released as the album's lead single in May 2002, which was promoted with an appeared on that year's Warped Tour. They continued to tour across the US, as well as Australia and Japan until the end of the year; 2003 saw the band visit Europe and play a variety of US festivals, prior to a North American headlining tour.

== Background and recording ==
Reel Big Fish released their third studio album Why Do They Rock So Hard? in October 1998. By July 1999, the band were in pre-production for their next album, with the plan to start recording at the end of the year. Following this, they toured with Blondie until September 1999, and went on a headlining tour in November 1999. After the new millennium, ska punk fell out of marketability and out of the mainstream. Despite this, the band had been writing more experimental-sounding tracks for their next studio album. In May 2000, the band began recording with producer Val Garay, with the aiming of releasing it in early 2001. Garay was mainly known for his 1980s work with Kim Carnes and the Motels. The band were reported finishing up the album by July 2000; however, the band was still working on the album in November 2000. In the midst of this, the band went on tour with James Valentine of Square playing guitar as frontman Aaron Barrett had broken his hand. In November 2000, they went on tour with Midtown. By December 2000, they were reportedly in the mixing process.

Unbeknownst to the band, their label Mojo Records were in talks with Jive Records about a potential merger; trumpeter Scott Klopfenstein said they were "giving us the runaround" as they were low on money for recording. This situation prompted the band to start touring again "because that's where we pay our bills". The label had been dropped by their parent company Universal; Barrett said of the situation: "We were waiting, we recorded a bunch of stuff and then we just waited, and waited, and nothing happened, and stuff got worse, and they got dropped from Universal and… We just went out on tour". He went as far as to wish that they were no longer on the label. Upon returning to the US from an overseas tour in September 2001, the band continued working on the album, until they went on another tour in October 2001. Sessions continued between December 2001 and January 2002; the following month, the band were recording cover versions of some songs, such as "Boss DJ" (1994) by Sublime, in Hollywood, California. After a show in New York City, where they debuted several new tracks, they spent a week in the city recording four songs, one of which being a cover of "Rock It with I" by the Melodians.

Cheer Up! was recorded across a variety of studios in California: World Class Audio in Anaheim; The Sound Factory in Hollywood; Jakes Place in Studio City; Paramount Studios in Hollywood; Sony Music Studios in Santa Monica; Grand Masters in Hollywood; and Brando's Paradise in San Gabriel. Garay produced and recorded the majority of the album's songs. Barrett and Klopfenstein produced "New York, New York", which was recorded by John Avila and Jim Goodwin. Barrett also produced "What Are Friends For" and "Valerie", both of which were recorded by Shawn Sullivan. Gordie Johnson produced "Boss DJ", which was recorded by David Schiffman. Sullivan served as the main engineer throughout recording, while Joseph Zook, Josh Atkins, and Adam Samuels acted as secondary engineers, assisted by Pavan Grewall. Sullivan, Homme, Atkins and Barrett did some digital editing. Sullivan and Homme mixed the tracks at World Class Audio, before the album was mastered by George Marino at Sterling Sound in New York City. In an interview after the album's release, Barrett described the process as: "2 years of on and off recording, moving from studio to studio, fighting for money and support from our label, fighting with a producer who did not understand our musical vision". The following year, Klopfenstein remarked that it was a "weird record to make you know. We were all in a very odd frame of mind, there was all sorts of label turmoil going on as well as personal turmoil [... it was] not a fun process for us. It was very serious".

== Composition and lyrics ==
=== Overview ===
Musically, Cheer Up! has been described as pop-punk and power pop; it has also been tagged as ska by one critic, but this has been disputed by another critic that said the band moved away from the genre in favor of rock. Mark Bushy of Punktastic similarly said it was "not a pop-punk album in any sense of imagination". Kenneth Partridge in his book Hell of a Hat: The Rise of '90s Ska and Swing (2021) wrote that it start with "five horn-fueled rock songs and offers only niblets of ska thereafter". AllMusic reviewer Stephen Thomas Erlewine felt that the "tempos have slowed down a little, and they've spent more time crafting their songs, punching up the melody to the forefront, turning this into more of a pop album than a smirky rock album". CMJ New Music Report writer Brooke Mongomery said it tackles the topic of heartbreak by "excorcising your rejection demons and embracing the 'loser' identity, and being much happier in the end" as a result.

Discussing the title, Jones said "if you are looking at lyrics in the album, they're really really sad and depressing, self-deprecating, you know, worse than any other album! I think Aaron was just in a weird kinda phase, kinda bummed out with the whole Mojo situation". In a 2015 interview, Barrett said of the release: "I don’t want to say this was a midlife crisis album, but it kind of was because we were trying to do different things and not repeat the exact same thing again". For previous releases, Barrett would write the majority of the tracks by himself; for Cheer Up!, Barrett would start with a main thematic part and then work on it with the rest of the members through jamming. Klopfenstein said he had more involvement in the writing, with him and Barrett collaborating on some of the tracks. In addition to their regular roles, Klopfenstein played electric piano, an octave solo on "Good Thing", lead vocals on "Drunk Again", and guitar on six of the album's songs, and trumpeter Tavis Werts played flugelhorn on ten of the tracks. Tyler Jones of Spring Heeled Jack contributed trumpet to "What Are Friends For", "Valerie" and "Boss DJ".

=== Tracks ===
Cheer Up! opens with "Good Thing", which features percussion from Ryland Steen of Square; Jones said it was Barrett's "first happy song", and that it referred to being in Reel Big Fish. In Music We Trust co-founder Alex Steininger said "Ban the Tube Top" is a "silly love song about an underage girl that turns them on because of the skintight tube top she is sporting". It is bookended by "Somebody Loved Me", which is in the vein of Loverboy, and "Cheer Up", which recalls the work of Sugar Ray. "Where Have You Been?" borders on alternative rock; it came about from Barrett trying to write a sequel to "Beer" after being asked to by Mojo. Someone had suggested to him that he swap the ska guitar part for picking to make it more distinct from "Beer". It initially had a horn section that was ultimately scrapped. The song's narrator discusses his girlfriend, who does not hang around with him often, with the narrator proclaiming she should "go to hell". "Suckers" includes percussion samples from Iki Levy, who would contribute the same for "Sayonara Senorita".

"What Are Friends For" is a slow-tempo ska track that includes drum samples and percussion from Kyle Homme, and is followed by another ska song, "A Little Doubt Goes a Long Way". The stadium anthem song "Rock 'n Roll Is Bitchin'" evokes the work of Spinal Tap. "New York, New York" (1977), a Liza Minnelli cover, is done in an a cappella style, with vocal percussion from Shawn Sullivan. The band had been asked to record the song for Frank Sinatra tribute album, and did it in a cappella as Jones said it would have been "really hard" to perform it like a big band could. The people behind the release were disappointed as they wanted something akin to the band's typical ska sound. The Latin instrumental "Sayonara Senorita" is followed by a reggae version of "Boss DJ", where Johnson servers as the titular DJ. The penultimate track, "Brand New Hero" also touches on alternative rock, while the closing song, "Drunk Again", takes influence from Lionel Richie and includes a string arrangement from Nic. tenBroek.

== Release ==
=== Pre-release promotion ===
In January and February 2001, the band embarked on a tour of Europe. In April and May 2001, they then went on a short US tour, followed by a UK tour in June 2001. A Canadian tour with Home Grown was followed by a co-headlining tour with Goldfinger, where they were supported by Home Grown, Rx Bandits, Zebrahead, Mest, and the Movielife. After one show, Barrett fell down a flight of stairs and injured his elbow, resulting in Valentine covering guitar duties again. They played a few shows in Hawaii and Japan with Zebrahead, prior to a European tour in August 2001. In September 2001, it was announced that the Zomba Group had acquired Mojo Records; alongside this, it was reported that Reel Big Fish's next album would appear in early 2002. They said this move was part of a "push to diversify [Zomba's] artist roster and beef up its catalog offerings". The following month, the band signed to Jive Records, a Zomba subsidiary; the label re-released the band's previous two albums shortly afterwards. Barrett said "Mojo wanted more of a modern rock hit [not ska]. But on Jive we were allowed to do things like 'Boss DJ' and 'Valerie'".

They toured with Goldfinger in October 2001; for this trek, Steen covered for Reel Big Fish's drummer Carlos De La Garza. On October 15, 2001, Werts left the band, which they said was due to an internal conflict. The following month, Jones was announced as his replacement; Spring Heeled Jack had previously toured with Reel Big Fish in 1998. Jones talked to the Pilfers manager Randy Nichols, who in turn put him in contact with Reel Big Fish's manager, who informed him of the situation. He later explained that Barrett "once described [Werts] to me as his mortal enemy". They embarked on a US tour throughout the month, however, Jones had to return home because of an illness in his family. In February and March 2002, they embarked on a mainland European tour with Sum 41 and a UK tour with Goldfinger. As a stop-gap release, Favorite Noise, a compilation of songs from their preceding albums, was released in Europe in March 2002. Barrett explained that they did not have a domestic release available in Europe, only import editions, so the label released the compilation to compensate.

=== Eventual release and subsequent promotion ===
On April 5, 2002, Cheer Up! was announced for release in two months' time. The following month, the band filmed a music video for "Where Have You Been". In early June 2002, "Good Thing", "Ban the Tube Top", "What Are Friends For" were posted on the band's website. "Where Have You Been?" was released to modern rock radio stations on June 10, 2002. The European CD version of "Where Have You Been?" included "Average Man" and a cover of "There Is Nothing Like a Dame" (1949) as its B-sides, alongside the "Where Have You Been?" music video. Barrett said their label "decided ['Where Have You Been?'] was the single because there were no horns on it and they said horns were over". The video for the song opens with Barrett singing outside a café, and later behind a display case, intermittently cutting to the band performing in a room with mannequins. A version of "Where Have You Been?" posted on the band's website included a spoken-word introduction that was left off the album version as Barrett felt it "would get old".

Originally planned for release in April 2002, Cheer Up! was eventually released on June 25, 2002; the UK edition, which saw release on July 29, 2002, included "Rock It with I" and a cover of "Kiss Me Deadly" (1988) by Lita Ford as bonus tracks. The latter had been previously available two years ago as part of a benefit album for the Heal the Bay advocacy group. The cover art of the evil clown was drawn by Aaron Barrett's father.

Between June and August 2002, the group went on the Warped Tour, where they were accompanied by Chris Rhodes of the Mighty Mighty Bosstones and formerly of Spring Heeled Jack for the trek. Garza took a break from the band due to the death of a family member, resulting in Steen covering for him again. Following this, they appeared at the Reading Festival in the UK; the band pulled out of the accompanying Leeds date due to delays and no other act letting them switch stage times with them. In September and October 2002, they embarked on a headlining US tour, with support from the Starting Line and the Kicks. They ended the year touring Australia and Japan.

In January and February 2003, Reel Big Fish went on a European tour with Sugarcult and the Starting Line; Reel Big Fish were once again joined by Rhodes for the trek. Between March and May 2003, the band headlined Skate and Surf Fest, appeared at the Ska Summit and Download Festivals, and toured with Home Grown and Los City Angels. On June 14, 2003, Garza left the band to focus on his family and was replaced by Justin Ferreria, who previously played with Barrett in the Forces of Evil. Klopfenstein said Garza had become tired of music overall and the constant touring involved. Since this was in the middle of a tour, the band forgoed an audition process and simply asked him if he could play the drums and had a passport. Between June and August, the band embarked on a headlining North American tour; Zebrahead, Wakefield and the Matches appeared on all of the shows while Gob and Riddlin' Kids supported on select dates. One show on the tour was filmed as part of The Show Must Go Off! series. At the end of August, the band appeared at the Terremoto Festival. In November 2003, the band supported Zebrahead for a few shows in Japan, and then played a one-off show in Hawaii with the Matches.

The Show Must Go Off video album, subtitled Live at the House of Blues, was released on November 18, 2003, which was promoted with a signing session the same day. "Ban the Tube Top", "Cheer Up", "Where Have You Been?", "Suckers" and "Give It to Me" were included on the band's third compilation album Greatest Hit...And More (2006). "Good Thing", "Ban the Tube Top", "Where Have You Been?", and "Suckers" were included on the band's fourth compilation album A Best of Us... For the Rest of Us (2010). In addition to this, acoustic renditions of "Where Have You Been?", and "Suckers" were included on the accompanying Skacoustic disc.

== Reception ==
Professional ratings
Review scores
Source	Rating
AllMusic	4.5/5 stars
In Music We Trust	B
The Mercury News	3/5 stars
Punknews.org	3.5/5 stars
Punktastic	4.5/5 stars

Cheer Up! was met with generally favourable reviews from music critics. Erlewine said the shift in sound "may distress some die-hard fans, but it actually results in a varied, infectious record that isn't just their most diverse album, it's their best". He added that while it did not "capture the zeitgeist like their debut, but there's more character here, and it's more consistent, too". Mongomery wrote that it was "much less caustic than previous attempts" as it weaves outside influences, such as Latin and reggae. Adrian Zupp of Rolling Stone complimented the mix of styles, and called it a "forceful and imaginative enough album to make lot of folks sit up and take notice". Bushy said regardless of the shift, "this is still the same Reel Big Fish that so many people fell in love with. The horns are still there, there are a number of great ska guitar riffs, and most importantly the sense of fun the band covey is still there".

Steininger felt that "without the ska, they seem two dimensional, but have enough sugary hooks to compensate and deliver an enjoyable treat". He mentioned that some of the songs "fall prey to their own saccharine ways and relying too much on the sweetness while falling short in the energy department". Punknews.org founder Aubin Paul wrote that as is the case with their previous releases, the lyrics were "always spot on, whether lyrically light, or painfully serious relationship deconstructions, and you can count on them to mix it up". Soundthesirens' Kamtin Mohager wrote that it "changes everybody's mood as they listen to this band create such happy and uplifting music, though sometimes the lyrics are bitter and harsh". Eric R. Danton of The Mercury News wrote that the "upbeat, energetic music mostly subverts the gloomy lyrics and only enhances the tongue-in-cheek songs".

Cheer Up! peaked at number 115 on the US Billboard 200; outside of the band's home country, it charted at number 47 in Australia and number 96 in the UK. "Where Have You Been?" reached number 76 in the UK Singles Chart.

== Track listing ==
All songs written and arranged by Reel Big Fish, except where noted.

Cheer Up! standard edition track listing
No.	Title	Writer(s)	Producer	Length
1.	"Good Thing"		Val Garay	3:38
2.	"Somebody Loved Me"		Garay	3:19
3.	"Ban the Tube Top"		Garay	3:10
4.	"Cheer Up"		Garay	2:43
5.	"Where Have You Been?"		Garay	4:01
6.	"Suckers"		Garay	3:58
7.	"What Are Friends For"		Aaron Barrett	3:35
8.	"A Little Doubt Goes a Long Way"		Garay	3:19
9.	"Dateless Losers"		Garay	3:34
10.	"Valerie"		Barrett	3:55
11.	"Rock 'n' Roll Is Bitchin'"		Garay	2:53
12.	"New York, New York" (Liza Minnelli cover)	John Kander; Fred Ebb	Barrett; Scott Klopfenstein	3:25
13.	"Sayonara Senorita"		Garay	4:09
14.	"Boss DJ" (Sublime cover)	Bradley Nowell	Gordie Johnson	3:09
15.	"Brand New Hero"		Garay	3:40
16.	"Drunk Again" (includes hidden track "Give It to Me"; the J. Geils Band cover)	Peter Wolf; Seth Justman ("Give It to Me")	Garay	10:33

== Personnel ==
Personnel per booklet.

Reel Big Fish

- Aaron Barrett – lead vocals, guitar
- Carlos de la Garza – drums, percussion
- Scott Klopfenstein – trumpet, backing vocals, lead vocals (track 16), guitar (tracks 1, 2, 4, 5, 9 and 15), electric piano, octave solo (track 1)
- Dan Regan – trombone, backing vocals
- Matt Wong – bass guitar

Additional musicians

- Tavis Werts – trumpet, flugelhorn (tracks 1–4, 6, 8, 9, 13, 15 and 16)
- Tyler Jones – trumpet (tracks 7, 10 and 14)
- Ryland Steen – percussion (track 1)
- Shawn Sullivan – vocal percussion (track 12)
- Kyle Homme – drum samples (track 7), percussion (track 7)
- Gordie Johnson – DJ (track 14)
- Iki Levy – percussion samples (tracks 6 and 13)
- Nic. tenBroek – string arrangement (track 16)

Production and design

- Val Garay – producer (tracks 1–6, 8, 9, 11, 13, 15, 16), recording (tracks 1–6, 8, 9, 11, 13, 15, 16)
- Aaron Barrett – producer (tracks 7, 10 and 12), digital editing
- Scott Klopfenstein – producer (track 12)
- John Avila – recording (track 12)
- Jim Goodwin – recording (track 12)
- Shawn Sullivan – recording (tracks 7 and 10), mixing, chief engineer, digital editing
- Kyle Homme – mixing, digital editing
- Gordie Johnson – producer (track 14)
- David Schiffman – recording (track 14)
- Joseph Zook – 2nd engineer
- Josh Atkins – 2nd engineer, digital editing
- Adam Samuels – 2nd engineer
- Pavan Grewall – assistant engineer
- Ross Garfield – studio technician
- Tom Ames – studio technician
- Alex Feliscian – studio technician
- George Marino – mastering
- Richard Harbaugh – photography
- Robert Barrett – cover art
- Mark Mediana – art direction, design

== Notes ==
- On the commentary for Reel Big Fish's The Show Must Go Off! DVD, Aaron Barrett says that the song "Valerie" is, contrary to popular belief, not about a girl, but is in fact about the album's producer, Val Garay.
- Aaron Barrett is quoted on You're All In This Together (the concert DVD included with Our Live Album Is Better than Your Live Album) as saying that he was asked indirectly by the president of Jive as to why "all of his songs were so depressing." In response to this statement, Aaron claims he went into the president's office and played a version of "Cheer Up", replacing all negative words with positive words; "I've got a funny feeling, we're not born to lose, and I've got a funny feeling that this life is worth living through!" Apparently, the president said he understood why the songs were so pessimistic.

== Charts ==
Chart performance for Cheer Up!
Chart (2002)	Peak position
Australian Albums (ARIA)	47
Scottish Albums (Official Charts)	97
UK Albums (Official Charts)	96
UK Independent Albums (Official Charts)	14
US Billboard 200	115

== See also ==
- Anthem – the 2003 album by contemporaries Less Than Jake that similarly saw the reduction of ska elements
