= Scott Klopfenstein =

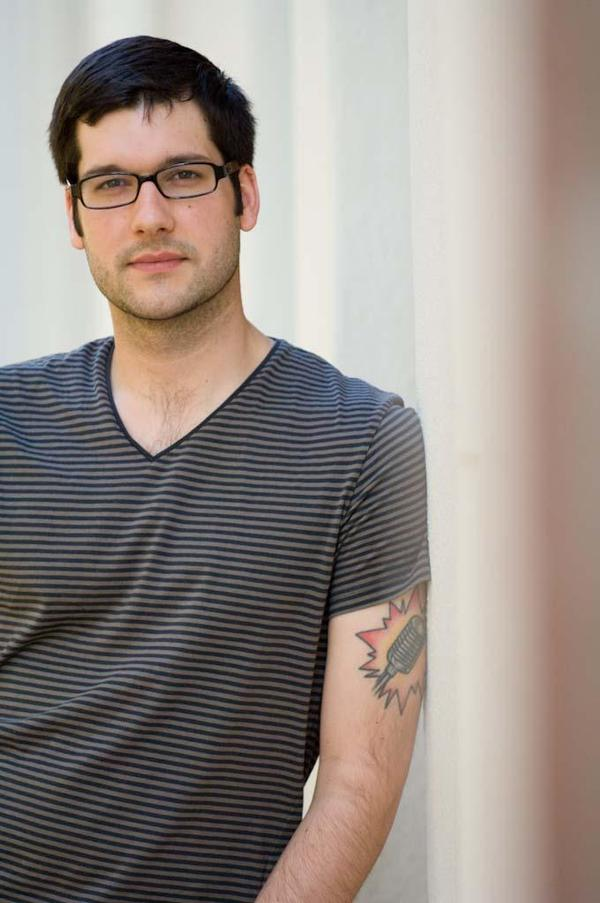
- Klopfenstein in 2007.

Background information
- Origin: Garden Grove, California, U.S.
- Genres: Ska punk, indie rock
- Occupations: Musician, songwriter
- Instruments: Vocals, trumpet, guitar, keyboard
- Years active: 1993–present
- Labels: Mojo, Jive, At the Helm, Records from Another Place

Scott Allen Klopfenstein is an American musician and a member of the band Reel Big Fish. He sings and plays trumpet, guitar, and keyboard.

Before joining Reel Big Fish, Klopfenstein played trumpet in Nuckle Brothers and trumpet and vocals in The Scholars. He briefly headed a side project called Pal with fellow former Scholars member Jesse Wilder, but then started The Littlest Man Band, which featured Dan Regan from Reel Big Fish, Vincent Walker from Suburban Legends, and three members of The Scholars. Reel Big Fish and The Littlest Man Band have performed at the same venues.

In 2005, Klopfenstein moved to New York City to live with his fiancée. In September, he was diagnosed with Guillain–Barré syndrome while touring New Zealand with Reel Big Fish. Klopfenstein was hospitalized immediately, and sent home to New York to recover. He rejoined the band for a New Year's Eve concert that year. While touring in Europe, Klopfenstein relapsed and was flown home from Amsterdam, unable to finish the rest of the tour. He subsequently returned to the band's lineup.

In September 2006, Klopfenstein married his fiancée, whom he has known since high school. In 2008, he played trumpet on the Less Than Jake album GNV FLA.

Klopfenstein retired from Reel Big Fish at the end of 2011, before the birth of his first child.

In concert, Klopfenstein often interacted with the audience and participated in banter with Barrett.

In 2021, Klopfenstein starred in the video for We Are the Union's single, "Make It Easy".

In 2026, Klopfenstein was revealed to have returned to Reel Big Fish.

== Discography ==
=== With Reel Big Fish ===
- Turn the Radio Off (1996)
- Why Do They Rock So Hard? (1998)
- Cheer Up! (2002)
- We're Not Happy 'til You're Not Happy (2005)
- Our Live Album Is Better than Your Live Album (2006)
- Duet All Night Long (2007)
- Monkeys for Nothin' and the Chimps for Free (2007)
- Fame, Fortune and Fornication (2009)
- A Best of Us for the Rest of Us (2010)

=== With The Littlest Man Band ===
- Better Book Ends (2004)

=== Solo ===
- Welcome to New York/The Hilarious (2019)
- Average Man (2020)
- Islands in the Stream (2021)
