= We're Not Happy 'til You're Not Happy =

Studio album by Reel Big Fish
- Released: April 5, 2005
- Recorded: 2004
- Studios: World Class Audio, Anaheim, CA; Milano Recording Studios, Orange, California
- Genre: Ska punk
- Length: 59:40
- Labels: Mojo; Jive; Zomba
- Producer: Aaron Barrett

Reel Big Fish chronology
Cheer Up! (2002)	We're Not Happy 'til You're Not Happy (2005)	Our Live Album Is Better Than Your Live Album (2006)

Reel Big Fish studio chronology
Cheer Up! (2002)	We're Not Happy 'til You're Not Happy (2005)	Monkeys for Nothin' and the Chimps for Free (2007)

Singles from Monkeys for Nothin' and the Chimps for Free
- 1. "Talkin' 'bout a Revolution" Released: 2005

We're Not Happy 'til You're Not Happy is the fifth studio album by American ska punk band Reel Big Fish. It was released on April 5, 2005 on Mojo Records to mixed reviews.

== Background and production ==
In February 2004, the band finished pre-production for their next album. Following this, they embarked on a tour of Europe, which lasted in March. In May 2004, they planned recording their next album. In June and July 2004, the band went on a North American tour, with Catch 22, Rx Bandits, Lucky Boys Confusion, and Big D and the Kids Table. Recording ultimately began in September 2004; around this time trumpeter Tyler Jones left the band. Jones' role was fulfilled by John Christianson, who worked with frontman Aaron Barrett in the Forces of Evil. Recording wrapped up in October 2004.

== Music ==
Notably darker than the band's previous album, Cheer Up!, the album's songs commonly express jealousy, regret, short-lasting fame, and disappointment toward mainstream record companies. The album also includes covers of Tracy Chapman's "Talkin' Bout a Revolution", Morrissey's "We Hate It When Our Friends Become Successful" and Social Distortion's "Story of My Life". Both the Chapman cover and the Social Distortion cover were respectively chosen as the first and second singles.

== Release ==
In November 2004, Reel Big Fish went on a West Coast US tour; the members spent the Christmas period working on side projects. On February 2, 2005, We're Not Happy 'til You're Not Happy was announced for release in two months' time. They embarked on a co-headlining tour with Bowling for Soup. "The Fire" was posted on the band's Myspace profile on March 18, 2005 ahead of the album. We're Not Happy 'til You're Not Happy was released on April 5, 2005 through Jive Records. In June 2005, they toured Europe, and then went on a US tour with American Hi-Fi, Punchline and Zolof the Rock & Roll Destroyer between June and August 2005. American Hi-Fi dropped off the tour and were replaced by Catch 22 from the July 17 date, as Barrett explains: "[American Hi-Fi] weren't being received very well by the ska kids, and because they were pretty burnt out from being on tour for a year and a half non-stop".

In late August 2005, they filmed a music video for "Don't Start a Band" with director Jonathan London. The following month, the band went on a month-long tour of the UK with the Matches, Skindred and My Awesome Compilation. They toured across New Zealand and Australia with Goldfinger and the Matches, leading up to a one-off show in Hawaii. On September 22, 2005, the "Don't Start a Band" video was posted online. While in New Zealand, trumpeter Scott Klopfenstein was hospitalized due to what the band referred to as "abnormal fatigue"; the rest of the band continued their scheduled performances. They went on a brief East Coast US tour with the Tossers and Transition. Reel Big Fish closed the year with a New Year's Eve show in Costa Mesa, California, with Klopfenstein back in the band.

Reel Big Fish opened 2006 with a co-headlining West Coast US tour with Goldfinger, dubbed the Deep Freeze Tour; they were supported by Zebrahead and Bottom Line. On January 13, 2006, the band announced they left Jive Records, with their manager Vince Pileggi explaining that the "traditional major label business model is a dinosaur whose feet are already covered in tar". A UK leg of the tour followed without Goldfinger, running into February 2006. Klopfenstein had to be flown home due to his previous illness flaring up as the rest of the band continued on a tour of mainland Europe. In March 2006, the band performed at The International Ska Circus festival. In July and August 2006, the band embarked on a headlining US tour, with support from MxPx, Streetlight Manifesto, Transition, and Whole Wheat Bread. In the midst of this, the band released the live album Our Live Album Is Better Than Your Live Album, which was recorded across several shows. Between October and December 2006, the band toured across the US with support from Streetlight Manifesto, Suburban Legends, and Westbound Train.

== Reception ==
Professional ratings
Review scores
Source	Rating
AllMusic	3/5 stars
IGN	7.3/10
Now	2/5
PopMatters	6/10
Punknews.org	2.5/5 stars

AllMusic described the album's songs as "angry" and "embittered", but also deemed the album as "super catchy".

== Track listing ==
All tracks are written by Aaron Barrett, except where noted.

We're Not Happy 'til You're Not Happy standard edition track listing
No.	Title	Writer(s)	Length
1.	"The Fire"	Barrett, Dan Regan, Matt Wong	3:05
2.	"Drinkin'"	Barrett, Regan	3:25
3.	"Don't Start a Band"		3:18
4.	"A-W-E-S-O-M-E"		3:32
5.	"We Hate It When Our Friends Become Successful" (Morrissey cover)	Morrissey, Alain Whyte	2:23
6.	"Turn the Radio Off"	Barrett, Regan	2:38
7.	"Talkin' 'bout a Revolution" (Tracy Chapman cover)	Tracy Chapman	3:24
8.	"The Bad Guy"	Barrett, Scott Klopfenstein, Regan, Wong	3:31
9.	"Story of My Life" (Social Distortion cover)	Mike Ness	4:10
10.	"The Joke's on Me"		3:49
11.	"One Hit Wonderful"		4:18
12.	"Last Show"	Barrett, Klopfenstein	3:02
13.	"Say Goodbye"		4:08
14.	"Your Guts (I Hate 'Em)" (ends at 2:06; includes hidden track "You're Gonna Die")		14:57
Total length:			59:40

Japanese bonus tracks
No.	Title	Length
15.	"Beer" (new version of song from Turn the Radio Off)	3:53
16.	"Way Back" (includes hidden track "You're Gonna Die")	15:27
Total length:		66:21

== Personnel ==
Reel Big Fish

- Aaron Barrett - lead vocals, guitar, synthesizer
- Scott Klopfenstein - backing vocals, guitar, electric keys, trumpet
- Dan Regan - trombone
- Matt Wong - bass
- John Christianson - trumpet

Additional musicians

- Justin Ferreira - drums
- Lars Stalfors - blast beats

Production

- Aaron Barrett - producer
- Shawn Sullivan - additional production, mixing, engineer
- Eddy Schreyer - mastering
- Lars Stalfors - assistant engineer
- Jesse Alvarado - additional engineer
- Beau Burchell - additional engineer
- David Irish - engineer, mixing (track 9)
- Chaz Harper - mastering (track 9)
- Denise Trotman - art direction, design
- John Halpern - photography
- Vince Pileggi - management

== Charts ==
Chart (2005)	Peak position
US Billboard 200	155
