= Reel Big Fish =

American ska punk band

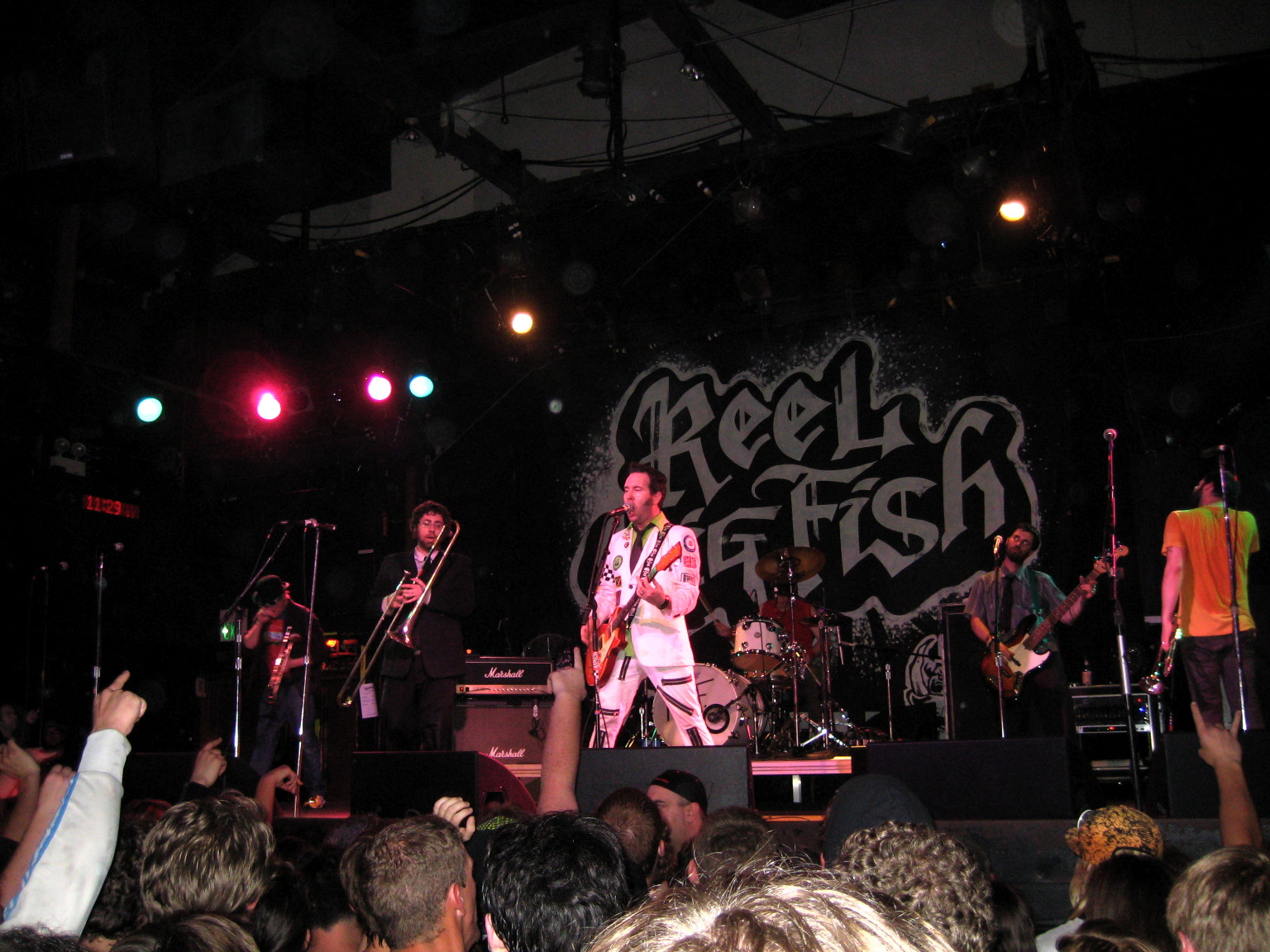
- Reel Big Fish performing at The Catalyst in Santa Cruz, California on March 27, 2008

Background information
- Origin: Los Alamitos, California, U.S.
- Genre: Ska punk
- Works: Reel Big Fish discography
- Years active: 1991–present (hiatus: 2020-2026)
- Labels: Mojo; Jive; Rock Ridge
- Spinoffs: The Forces of Evil; The Littlest Man Band
- Members: Aaron Barrett; Matt Appleton; Derek Gibbs; John Christianson; Scott Klopfenstein; Edward Larsen; Dan Regan
- Past members: See members section
- Website: reel-big-fish.com

Reel Big Fish is an American ska punk band from Los Alamitos, California, United States. The band gained mainstream recognition in the mid-to-late 1990s during the third wave of ska with the release of the gold-certified album Turn the Radio Off. Soon after, the band lost mainstream recognition but gained an underground cult following, operating as an independent band since 2006. Frontman Aaron Barrett has been the only consistent member of the band from its founding throughout its numerous lineup changes.

== History ==
=== 1991–2001: Early success ===
The band formed in 1991 while the members were in high school. The group started as a cover band until they released a demo in 1992, titled In The Good Old Days. With the departure of Ben Guzman soon after, then backup vocalist Aaron Barrett took his place as lead singer. The band then changed its genre to ska.

Reel Big Fish's self-released debut album, Everything Sucks, was successful and became an underground hit spread by word-of-mouth, which led to the band signing a deal with Mojo Records. In August 1996, the band released the album Turn the Radio Off on the new label, which appealed to fans of ska punk style, and the band began touring throughout the United States. After the single "Sell Out" became well known in mainstream venues, including MTV, the album peaked at number 57 on the Billboard charts, staying on the charts for 32 weeks. However, the ska revival was short-lived, and the group's 1998 album Why Do They Rock So Hard? failed to match the sales of the band's previous record. In 1998, the band appeared in the movie BASEketball, performing in the stands to rouse the crowd. The band also appeared on the film's soundtrack with a cover of A-ha's "Take On Me". Why Do They Rock So Hard? was the last album for two members of the band. Trombonist Grant Barry was fired for his conduct, culminating with him committing battery on a security guard at Mississippi Nights during a concert in St. Louis, and drummer Andrew Gonzales left the band to spend more time with his family.

=== 2001–2006: Major label years ===
Trumpet player Tavis Werts left the band in 2001. Former Suburban Rhythm drummer Carlos de la Garza and former Spring Heeled Jack trumpeter Tyler Jones, who tracked for two songs on Cheer Up! (because Werts had already recorded the majority of his trumpet parts before his departure), were brought in. De la Garza's last concert with Reel Big Fish was on June 20, 2003, at the House of Blues in Anaheim, California. That concert was later released as a DVD in The Show Must Go Off! series. Jones appeared in the music videos for "Where Have You Been?" and "Monkey Man" (although neither featured any trumpet-playing), and continued to play live with the band until September 2004. Jones was replaced by trumpeter John Christianson, who had previously played with Barrett in the band, The Forces of Evil.

On April 5, 2005, the band released its fourth album on Mojo, We're Not Happy 'Til You're Not Happy. Justin Ferreira (who replaced De La Garza) was on drums for the recording, but left before the album's release to join the Orange County band Takota and subsequently is listed as an additional musician on the CD. He was replaced by Ryland Steen.

Compared to the previous album (Cheer Up!), which was more lighthearted and cheerful, Allmusic describes the songs in We're Not Happy 'Til You're Not Happy as "angry" and "embittered", but also deemed the album as "super catchy". Common themes expressed throughout the songs include jealousy, regret, short-lasting fame, and disappointment toward mainstream record companies.

Aaron Barrett has stated that We're Not Happy 'Til You're Not Happy was "the third record in a trilogy" that began with Turn the Radio Off. "The first one was about being in a band and trying to make it. Then Why Do They Rock So Hard? was like, 'we've made it, we're rock stars'. Cheer Up we made because we had to make it. But We're Not Happy 'Til You're Not Happy is about us being old and jaded now."

=== 2006–present: Independent work ===
While on tour in early 2006, Reel Big Fish were dropped from the Jive Records label. The band formed its own label and released a 3-disc live performance CD/DVD set, Our Live Album Is Better Than Your Live Album. This package became available on July 18, 2006, on the Internet and in retail stores on August 22. Jive later released a Reel Big Fish greatest hits album, Greatest Hit...And More.

On February 20, 2007, the band released Duet All Night Long, which is a split EP with power pop punk band Zolof the Rock & Roll Destroyer. It features six cover songs (three from each band), with the two vocalists performing with both bands. The song, "Say Say Say" features Scott Klopfenstein on vocals in place of Barrett.

The band released its first studio album since leaving Jive Records; Monkeys for Nothin' and the Chimps for Free worldwide on July 10, 2007, on the Rock Ridge Music record label. On June 26, 2007, shortly before its release, the band announced in a Myspace blog that Matt Wong was leaving the band to spend more time with his wife and newborn child. He was replaced by Derek Gibbs who played bass in Jeffries Fan Club and Aaron Barrett's now defunct side project, The Forces Of Evil. Since Matt Wong was very popular with fans, some were skeptical of the new bassist's ability, but the band has stated that Derek Gibbs is "Matt Wong Approved" therefore extinguishing several fans' worries. Gibbs had been filling in for Wong on various tours since early 2002.

On December 19, 2007, the band announced that it would play the entire Warped Tour 2008.

Reel Big Fish released a new studio album on January 20, 2009. The name of the album is Fame, Fortune and Fornication, and it consists of 10 cover songs. Another album, A Best of Us for the Rest of Us, featuring a 22-track disc of re-recorded songs and a 14-track disc of "Skacoustic" versions produced by lead singer Aaron Barrett, was released on July 20, 2010. An extended version of the album, A Best of Us for the Rest of Us (Bigger Better Bonus Deluxe Version), was released on June 21, 2011. The group also intended to work on a new album, recording new songs in the fall of 2010. The band has also recorded a live DVD at The Grove in Anaheim, California, on January 4, 2009; which was released on July 21, 2009, with the title Reel Big Fish Live! In Concert! In an interview with 'The Examiner', Aaron Barrett stated that he planned on releasing a new album, with all new material, in late 2011.

On January 11, 2011, the band announced that longtime member Scott Klopfenstein would be leaving the band to focus on raising a family. Matt Appleton of Goldfinger began filling in for Scott on the band's 20th Anniversary Tour, and he has since been announced as a permanent replacement. This marks the first time since 1995 that the band has had a saxophone player.

In March 2012, Reel Big Fish announced via Facebook that the group had begun recording a new album of new, original songs. The album is titled Candy Coated Fury, though the band also considered Honk If You're Horny as a title. The album was released on July 31, 2012.

On October 21, 2013, the band announced via its website that long-time trombonist Dan Regan, who has played with Reel Big Fish since 1994, will depart from the band to spend more time with his family and follow his dream of starting a brewery.

Reel Big Fish announced a co-headline UK and Ireland tour with Less Than Jake with support from Zebrahead in early 2014.

In November 2014, Reel Big Fish announced on Facebook that the group would release an EP titled Happy Skalidays scheduling release on December 15, 2014.

In February 2015, the band announced through its website that drummer Ryland Steen had gone on hiatus from the band in order to play drums in America. Since the summer of 2014, Edward Beach (née Larsen) of Suburban Legends has been filling in.

On October 9, 2018, through their Instagram page, the band announced a new single called "You Can't Have All of Me", released on October 12. They also confirmed the title for the new album to be Life Sucks...Let's Dance! and a December release.

On April 11, 2019, Billy Kottage announced that he had quit the band via his Instagram page. Kottage has since toured as a featured musician with The Interrupters. Brian Robertson of Suburban Legends played with the band from June 2019 until their touring hiatus starting in 2020.

On March 22, 2020, former trumpet player Tyler Jones died; the band paid its respects via social media.

On October 28, 2021, former member Scott Klopfenstein reunited with Aaron Barrett to sing on a track by Lo(u)ser titled No Hope. Former drummer Ryland Steen played drums and produced, and Dan Regan also appeared in the music video alongside the others.

In July 2024, Ice Nine Kills released a cover of "Walking On Sunshine" in collaboration with Reel Big Fish, featuring Dan Regan as a credited band member for the first time since 2013.

After 6 years of inactivity, on April 24, 2026, Reel Big Fish were announced to be playing the Long Beach and Orlando dates for the Vans Warped Tour. They performed at Warped Tour in July and November respectively.

== Band members ==
Current members

- Aaron Barrett – lead vocals, guitar, keyboards (1991–present)
- Scott Klopfenstein – trumpet, backing vocals, lead vocals, guitar, keyboards (1995-2011; 2026–present)
- Dan Regan – trombone, backing vocals (1994–2013; 2024–present)
- John Christianson – trumpet, backing vocals (2004–present)
- Derek Gibbs – bass, backing vocals (2007–present)
- Matt Appleton – saxophone, keyboards, vocals (2011–present)
- Ed "Smokey" Beach (né Larsen) – drums, percussion (2014–present)

== Discography ==
Studio albums

- Everything Sucks (1995)
- Turn the Radio Off (1996)
- Why Do They Rock So Hard? (1998)
- Cheer Up! (2002)
- We're Not Happy 'til You're Not Happy (2005)
- Monkeys for Nothin' and the Chimps for Free (2007)
- Fame, Fortune and Fornication (2009)
- Candy Coated Fury (2012)
- Life Sucks...Let's Dance! (2018)

== Related projects ==
- Scott Klopfenstein and Dan Regan were also members of The Littlest Man Band.
- Aaron Barrett, Derek Gibbs and John Christianson were also members of The Forces of Evil, along with former members of Jeffries Fan Club and other Orange County ska musicians.
- Before they were members of Reel Big Fish, Aaron Barrett, Scott Klopfenstein, and Grant Barry were members of a band called The Scholars.
- Dan Regan has a techno project called Black Casper. Notably, he remixed Reel Big Fish's cover of "Talkin' 'bout a Revolution", incorporating different sound bites, including Ali Tabatabaee from Reel Big Fish's live DVD, You're All In This Together.
