= Goldfinger discography =

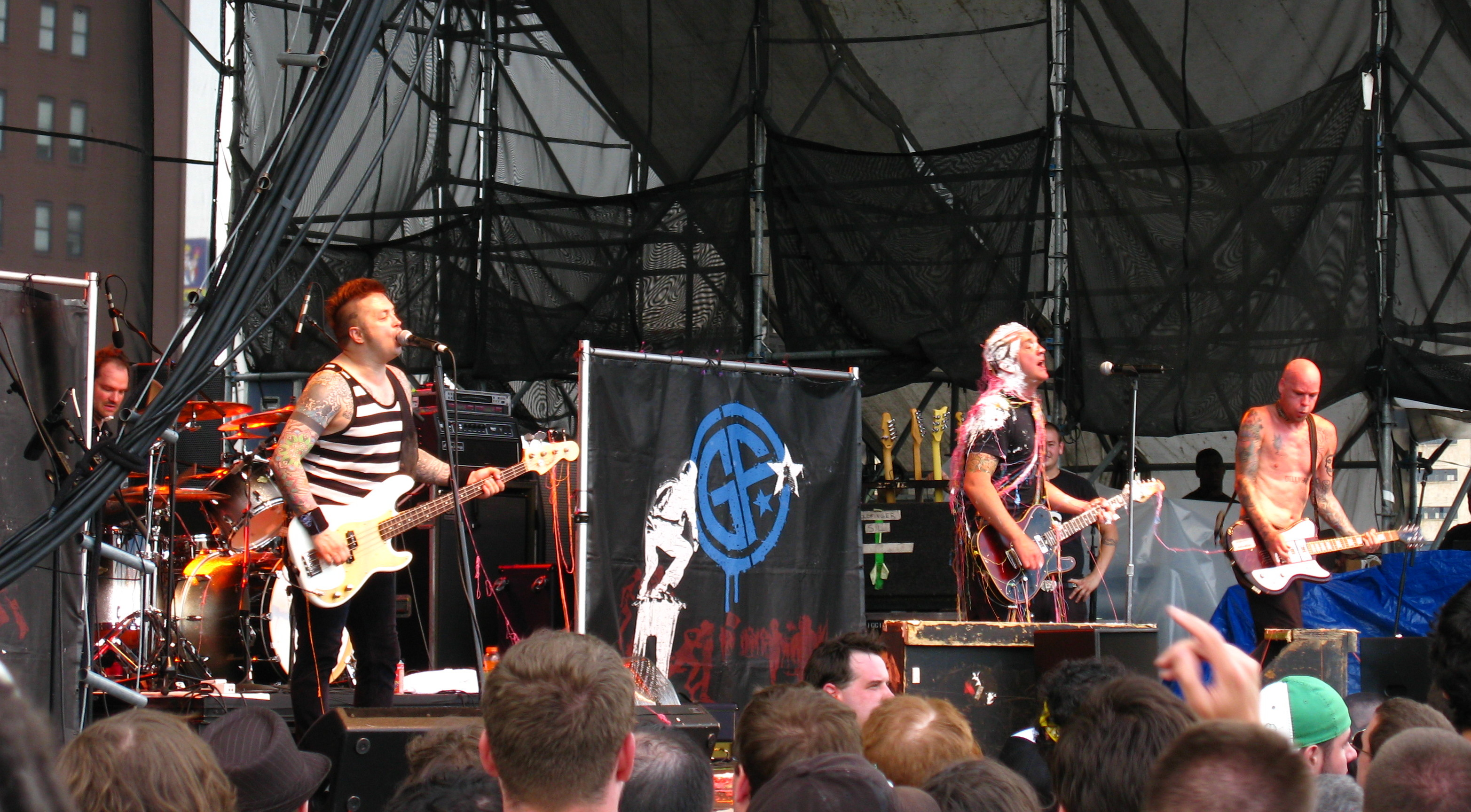
- Goldfinger live in Philadelphia in 2008
- Studio albums: 8
- EPs: 4
- Live albums: 3
- Singles: 17
- Music videos: 16

The following is the discography of Goldfinger, a Los Angeles–based punk rock band formed in 1994 by John Feldmann on vocals and guitar, Simon Williams on bass, former drummer of Buffalo NY's Zero Tolerance Darrin Pfeiffer on drums, and Charlie Paulson on guitar. The band released six studio albums between 1996 and 2008, as well as three live albums, a compilation album, four extended plays, seventeen singles, and sixteen music videos.

The band released their self-titled debut album in 1996, which featured their biggest hit, "Here in Your Bedroom", which reached number five on the U.S. Billboard's Hot Modern Rock Tracks chart, and within the top 15 on RPM's Alternative 30 in Canada. Their second album, Hang-Ups (1997), represented their biggest chart position on the Billboard 200 at number 85, and featured the song "Superman", which became well known for its appearance in the video game Tony Hawk's Pro Skater (1999).

Their next album, Stomping Ground (2000), featured a cover of Nenas' "99 Red Balloons", which was licensed on a number of movie soundtracks. Subsequent albums—Open Your Eyes (2002), Disconnection Notice (2005), and Hello Destiny... (2008)—did not fare as well, and the band temporarily ceased recording music, instead becoming an occasional touring act. In 2017, they released their comeback album The Knife. In 2020, they released their eighth studio album, titled Never Look Back.

== Albums ==
=== Studio albums ===
List of studio albums, with selected chart positions, sales figures and certifications
Title	Album details	Peak chart positions							Sales	Certifications
Title	Album details	US	US Indie	AUT	GER	UK	UK Indie	UK Rock	Sales	Certifications
Goldfinger	Released: February 27, 1996; Label: Mojo	110	—	—	—	—	—	—	CAN: 50,000	MC: Gold
Hang-Ups	Released: September 9, 1997; Label: Mojo	85	—	—	—	—	—	—		
Stomping Ground	Released: March 28, 2000; Label: Mojo	109	—	37	46	—	—	—		
Open Your Eyes	Released: May 21, 2002; Label: Mojo/Jive	136	—	—	—	162	22	—		
Disconnection Notice	Released: February 15, 2005; Label: Maverick	—	—	—	—	—	—	—		
Hello Destiny...	Released: April 22, 2008; Label: SideOneDummy	—	43	—	—	—	45	—		
The Knife	Released: July 21, 2017; Label: Rise	— (Note: The Knife did not enter the US Billboard 200, but peaked at number 96 on the US Top Current Albums Chart.)	21	—	—	—	33	29		
Never Look Back	Released: December 4, 2020; Label: Big Noise	—	—	—	—	—	—	—		
Nine Lives	Released: January 23, 2026; Label: Big Noise	—	—	—	—	—	—	—		
"—" denotes a recording that did not chart or was not released in that territory.

=== Live albums ===
Title	Album details
Darrin's Coconut Ass: Live from Omaha	Released: November 9, 1999; Label: Mojo
Foot in Mouth	Released: 2001; Label: Mojo
Live at the House of Blues	Released: March 23, 2004; Label: Kung-Fu

=== Compilation albums ===
Title	Album details
The Best of Goldfinger	Released: April 19, 2005; Label: Mojo/Jive/Legacy

=== Extended plays ===
Title	Album details
Richter	Released: 1995; Label: Mojo
99 Red Balloons	Released: 2000; Label: Mojo
Ted Nugent	Released: 2000; Label: Mojo
The Goldfinger Christmas EP	Released: December 14, 2018; Label: Big Noise

== Singles ==
List of singles, with selected chart positions and certifications, showing year released and album name
Title	Year	Peak chart positions								Certifications	Album
Title	Year	US Air.	US Alt	CAN Alt.	GER	SCO	SWI	UK	UK Indie	Certifications	Album
"Here in Your Bedroom"	1996	47	5	11	—	—	—	—	—		Goldfinger
"Mable"	1996	—	—	—	—	—	—	—	—		Goldfinger
"Pictures"	1996	—	—	—	—	—	—	—	—		Goldfinger
"This Lonely Place"	1997	—	14	—	—	—	—	—	—		Hang-Ups
"My Head"	1997	—	—	—	—	—	—	—	—		Hang-Ups
"Seems Like Yesterday"	1998	—	—	—	—	—	—	—	—		Meet the Deedles: The Original Motion Picture Soundtrack
"More Today Than Yesterday"	1998	—	—	—	—	—	—	—	—		The Waterboy: Original Soundtrack
"Counting the Days"	2000	—	—	—	—	—	—	—	—		Stomping Ground
"99 Red Balloons"	2000	—	—	—	39	—	81	—	—	RIAA: Gold	Stomping Ground
"Tell Me"	2002	—	—	—	—	—	—	—	—		Open Your Eyes
"Open Your Eyes"	2002	—	37	—	—	67	—	75	13		Open Your Eyes
"Spokesman"	2002	—	—	—	—	—	—	81	13		Open Your Eyes
"Wasted"	2005	—	—	—	—	—	—	—	—		Disconnection Notice
"I Want"	2005	—	—	—	—	—	—	—	—		Disconnection Notice
"Stalker"	2005	—	—	—	—	—	—	—	—		Disconnection Notice
"One More Time"	2008	—	—	—	—	—	—	—	—		Hello Destiny...
"Am I Deaf"	2013	—	—	—	—	—	—	—	—		The Knife
"Put the Knife Away"	2017	—	—	—	—	—	—	—	—		The Knife
"Wallflower"	2020	—	—	—	—	—	—	—	—		Never Look Back
"I Had Some Help (ft. Less Than Jake)"	2024	—	—	—	—	—	—	—	—		Non-album single
"Freaking Out a Bit (ft. Mark Hoppus)"	2025	—	—	—	—	—	—	—	—		Nine Lives
"Chasing Amy"	2025	—	—	—	—	—	—	—	—		Nine Lives
"—" denotes a recording that did not chart or was not released in that territory.

=== Split singles ===
Title	Year	Other artist(s)
"Teen Beef" / "Tiger Meat"	1996	Reel Big Fish

== Other certified songs ==
Title	Year	Certifications	Album
"Superman"	1998	RIAA: Gold	Hang-Ups

== Music videos ==
List of music videos and directors
Title	Year	Director	Album
Here in Your Bedroom	1996	Richard Reines	Goldfinger
Mable	1996	Richard Reines, Hunter Senftner, Ross Guidici, and Richard Hopeless	Goldfinger
Only a Day	1996		Goldfinger
This Lonely Place	1997	Jeff Gordon	Hang-Ups
More Today Than Yesterday	1998	Marcos Siega	Non-album single
Feel Like Making Love	1999		Darrin's Coconut Ass
Counting the Days	2000		Stomping Ground
San Simeon	2000		Stomping Ground
99 Red Balloons	2000	Hans Hammers Jr. II	Stomping Ground
Open Your Eyes	2002	Troy Smith	Open Your Eyes
Spokesman	2002		Open Your Eyes
Tell Me	2002		Open Your Eyes
Wasted	2005	Nick Lambrou	Disconnection Notice
I Want	2005	Nick Lambrou	Disconnection Notice
Too Many Nights	2005		Disconnection Notice
One More Time	2008		Hello Destiny...
Tijuana Sunrise	2018		The Knife
A Million Miles	2018		The Knife
Rudolph the Red-Nosed Raindeer	2018		The Goldfinger Christmas EP
Wallflower	2020	Caleb Alvarez	Never Look Back
Nothing to Me	2020	Josh Thornberry	Never Look Back
I Had Some Help (ft. Less Than Jake)	2024	Julian Feldmann	Non-album single
Freaking Out a Bit (ft. Mark Hoppus)	2025		Nine Lives
Chasing Amy	2025	Dark Sight	Nine Lives

== Compilation appearances ==
Year	Album	Song
1997	Violent World: Misfits Tribute	"Ghoul's Night Out"
1997	Duran Duran Tribute Album	"Rio"
2000	Sleighed: Other Side of Christmas	"White Christmas"
2003	Liberation: Songs to Benefit PETA	"Fuck Ted Nugent"
2005	Until Every Cage Is Empty	"What Gives You the Right"

== Soundtrack appearances ==
Year	Movie	Song
1996	Kingpin	"Superman"
1998	BASEketball	"Hopeless"
1998	Meet the Deedles	"Seems Like Yesterday"
1998	Dead Man on Campus	"Walking in the Dark"
1998	The Waterboy	"More Today Than Yesterday"
1999	American Pie	"Vintage Queen"
2000	Our Lips Are Sealed	"99 Red Balloons"
2001	Not Another Teen Movie	"99 Red Balloons"
2004	EuroTrip	"99 Red Balloons"
2024	Sonic the Hedgehog 3	"99 Red Balloons"

== Video game appearances ==
Year	Song	Game	Platform(s)
1999	"Superman"	Tony Hawk's Pro Skater	PlayStation, Nintendo 64, Dreamcast
2000	"I'm Down"	MTV Sports: Skateboarding featuring Andy MacDonald	PlayStation, Dreamcast
2000	"I'm Down"	ESPN X-Games Snowboarding	PlayStation 2
2001	"99 Red Balloons"	Gran Turismo 3: A-Spec	PlayStation 2
2002	"Spokesman"	Tony Hawk's Pro Skater 4	PlayStation, PlayStation 2, GameCube, Xbox, Windows, Mac
2005	"I Want"	Burnout Revenge	PlayStation 2, Xbox, Xbox 360
2005	"I Want"	Burnout Legends	PlayStation Portable, Nintendo DS
2005	"My Everything"	SSX On Tour	PlayStation 2, PlayStation Portable, GameCube, Xbox
2008	"Counting the Days"	Shaun White Snowboarding	PlayStation 3, Xbox 360, Wii
2012	"Superman"	Tony Hawk's Pro Skater HD	PlayStation 3, Xbox 360, Windows PC
2020	"Superman"	Tony Hawk's Pro Skater 1 + 2	PlayStation 4, PlayStation 5, Xbox One, Xbox Series X/S, Nintendo Switch, Windows PC
2021	"Superman"	Rock Band 4 (DLC)	PlayStation 4, Xbox One
