= Electric Love Hogs =

US musical group (1991–1993)

- Origin: San Diego, California, U.S.
- Genres: Funk rock, heavy metal, hard rock, funk metal
- Years active: 1991–1993
- Label: London
- Past members: John Feldmann; Kelly LeMieux; Bobby Hewitt; Donny Campion; Dave Kushner

Electric Love Hogs were a short-lived American funk rock band formed in San Diego, California, in 1991. The band's lineup consisted of John Feldmann (vocals, guitar), Dave Kushner (guitar), Donny Campion (guitar), Kelly LeMieux (bass) and Bobby Hewitt (drums, percussion). They released one self-titled album in 1992, followed by a tour of the United States and United Kingdom, before they disbanded the following year.

== History ==
=== Formation and Electric Love Hogs (1991–1993) ===
John Feldmann, Kelly LeMieux and Bobby Hewitt formed Electric Love Hogs, as a cover band, in San Diego in 1991. Their name was chosen as a satirical swipe at the Los Angeles glam metal scene of the late '80s. They soon added guitarists Dave Kushner, formerly of Wasted Youth, and Donny Campion to the lineup. They recorded their debut album at Devonshire Sound Studios with producer Mark Dodson, though Mötley Crüe's Tommy Lee co-produced two songs. The album featured contributions from Stephen Perkins of Jane's Addiction, John Norwood Fisher of Fishbone and Bronx Style Bob among others. The same year, Kushner contributed guitars to the song "Punk It Up" for the Infectious Grooves debut album The Plague That Makes Your Booty Move...It's the Infectious Grooves, also produced by Dodson, released in 1991 before touring with the band for a short time.

Electric Love Hogs was released in 1992 through London Records. The band toured the US with Stone Temple Pilots and L.A. Guns while they also toured the United Kingdom with Ugly Kid Joe. By 1993, Electric Love Hogs disbanded.

=== Post-breakup activities (1993–present) ===
Feldmann formed Goldfinger in 1994 with Simon Williams. They released seven studio albums, Goldfinger (1996), Hang-Ups (1997), Stomping Ground (2000), Open Your Eyes (2002), Disconnection Notice (2005), Hello Destiny (2008), The Knife (2017), as well as a number of extended plays and singles while the band went through a few lineup changes. Feldmann has also produced records for blink-182, Mest, The Used, Hilary Duff and Story of the Year among others.

LeMieux joined Shrine before joining MD.45, the one-off side project that consisted of Megadeth's Dave Mustaine, Fear singer Lee Ving as well as then Alice Cooper and former Suicidal Tendencies drummer Jimmy DeGrasso. They released one studio album entitled The Craving in 1996 before disbanding. In 1998, he joined Goldfinger, replacing Williams.

Hewitt formed Orgy, with Jay Gordon, Ryan Shuck, Amir Derakh and Paige Haley, in 1997 They achieved mainstream success with the albums Candyass (1998) and Vapor Transmission (2000) before Hewitt departed to tour with Snake River Conspiracy, though he participated in the recording of Orgy's third album Punk Statik Paranoia (2004).

Campion joined Handsome in 1997, replacing previous guitarist Tom Capone. The band toured the US with Silverchair, Local H and Less Than Jake, while they supported Wu-Tang Clan and Voodoo Glow Skulls in Europe before disbanding in 1998.

Kushner toured and recorded with Suicidal Tendencies and Infectious Grooves singer Mike Muir, on the album Lost My Brain! (Once Again) before going on to join Danzig. Kushner's tenure in Danzig lasted nearly a year where he performed only one show at the Whisky a Go Go in Hollywood, California. He joined the hard rock group Zilch, formed by former X Japan guitarist hide. Following the death of hide, they recorded and released Skyjin in 2001, before Kushner became musical director Dave Navarro's solo band and later joined Duff McKagan's band Loaded. In 2003, along with McKagan and his former Guns N' Roses bandmates, Slash, Matt Sorum, as well as then former Stone Temple Pilots singer Scott Weiland, Kushner formed the hard rock supergroup Velvet Revolver. They released two studio albums, Contraband and Libertad, before going on hiatus in 2008 following the departure of Weiland. During this time, he began composing music for film and television, most notable, the theme song for FX series Sons of Anarchy entitled "This Life" where he received an Emmy Award nomination for Outstanding Main Title Theme Music in 2009 and an ASCAP Award in 2010.

== Band members ==
- Donny Campion – guitar
- John Feldmann – vocals
- Bobby Hewitt – drums, percussion
- Dave Kushner – guitar
- Kelly LeMieux – bass

== Discography ==
- Electric Love Hogs (1992)
