= Superman (Goldfinger song) =

Song by Goldfinger

from the album Hang-Ups
- Released: September 9, 1997
- Recorded: 1996
- Genre: Ska punk
- Length: 3:05
- Label: Mojo
- Songwriter: John Feldmann
- Producers: Jay Rifkin; John Feldmann

"Superman" is a song by American rock band Goldfinger. It is the first track off their second studio album, Hang-Ups, released in 1997 via Mojo Records.

== Background ==
The song gained recognition thanks to the Tony Hawk's video game franchise when it first appeared in the first installment of the series, Tony Hawk's Pro Skater in addition to its 2012 and 2020 remakes. The song became so strongly associated with the video game that it formed a core part of the recognisability of the series, with the 2020 documentary about the games, Pretending I'm a Superman: The Tony Hawk Video Game Story, being named from the song.

Lead singer John Feldmann said of the track:

Back when the game came out, there were soundtracks for games during that era, but it was mostly music written specifically for the game. I’m sure it existed before Pro Skater, but Pro Skater was the game that people had where it was the soundtrack to their lives. I really didn’t know how much Tony Hawk helped our band with that song until we were on tour in England. We were touring with Bloodhound Gang and supporting them as they had this huge hit at the time in Germany, so we played with them in England and all of a sudden when we played 'Superman,' everyone went ballistic. It was the biggest circle pit of the entire night. There was no moment in Bloodhound Gang’s set or our set that surpassed what happened with that song. I was like, 'What the fuck is happening with this song?' But I put two and two together and realized that Pro Skater had globally just become this huge hit of a video game.

"Superman" was also used in the 1996 film Kingpin. The song was certified Gold by the RIAA in 2024.

== Legacy ==
Goldfinger re-recorded the track for the deluxe edition of their eighth studio album, Never Look Back, released on August 5, 2022, featuring Simon Neil of Biffy Clyro. Since 2023, Tony Hawk has periodically joined Goldfinger on stage to perform the track, most notably during that year's When We Were Young festival in Las Vegas, and 2025's Vans Warped Tour in Long Beach.

== Personnel ==
=== Goldfinger ===
- John Feldmann – vocals, guitar
- Charlie Paulson – guitar
- Darrin Pfeiffer – drums
- Simon Williams – bass

=== Additional performers ===
- Angelo Moore, Kip Wirtzfeld, Jonas Cabrera, Gabrial McNair, Scott Klopfenstein, Dan Regan, Garth Schultz, Mike Menchaca – horns

=== Production ===
- Jay Rifkin and John Feldmann – production
- Chris Johnson, Kevin Globerman, and Slamm Andrews – engineering
- Josh Achziger and Bruno Roussel – additional engineering
- Dave Jerden – mixing
- Annette Cisneros, Bryan Carlstrom, Elan Trujillo, and Bryan Hall – assisting
- Eddie Schryer – mastering

== Certifications ==
Region	Certification	Certified units/sales
United States (RIAA)	Gold	500,000^{‡}
^{‡} Sales+streaming figures based on certification alone.
