= Here in Your Bedroom =

- The single's cover art, by Alan Forbes

Single by Goldfinger

from the album Goldfinger
- Released: 1996
- Genre: Ska punk; pop-punk; alternative rock
- Length: 3:10
- Label: Mojo
- Songwriter(s): John Feldmann
- Producer(s): Jay Rifkin

Goldfinger singles chronology
"Here in Your Bedroom" (1996)	"Mable" (1996)

"Here in Your Bedroom" is a song by the American punk rock band Goldfinger. It was released in 1996 on Mojo Records as their debut single from their self-titled debut studio album. The song is based on the band's frontman, John Feldmann, and a brief relationship he had with a woman. The song was the band's biggest chart success, peaking at number five on Billboard's Modern Rock Tracks in the United States. It also peaked at number 11 on RPM's Alternative 30 in Canada, and at number 47 on Billboard's Hot 100 Airplay chart.

== Background ==
"Here in Your Bedroom" was based on Goldfinger frontman John Feldmann's personal experiences. He was working at a store selling shoes, and he had a crush on a woman working in the dress department for over eight months. "'Here in Your Bedroom' is all about those wacky emotions that a sensitive guy like me gets at a time like that. When we were in her room, there was nothing else going on in the world but me and her," he told Billboard when the song achieved success. He noted that the experience was beneficial as a songwriter, as he gained three new songs from it. They first got together on New Year's 1995:

This girl and I hung out and we hooked up and I was up all night hanging out with this girl. I didn't sleep at all. I woke up right before my sister got there at 10 in the morning. I wrote "Here In Your Bedroom" from like 9AM to 9:08. It took me eight minutes to write the whole song. It was inspired by all this passion and pent-up crush energy and I wrote that song about this girl and about the next day—"Will you still feel the same?" [...] I wrote it all immediately. I knew it was going to be a ska verse and a pop-punk chorus. I knew everything, it all came clearly.

In addition, Feldmann was inspired by his visiting sister, whom he had not seen in a year. As for the girl, she quickly broke up with Feldmann and moved to Texas. Upon the song's twentieth anniversary in 2016, Feldmann called it his favorite song on the band's self-titled debut album, Goldfinger.

In 2022, the song was re-recorded for the deluxe version of Never Look Back, featuring Avril Lavigne.

== Formats and track listing ==
All songs written by John Feldmann, except where noted.

CD maxi single (UND 56010)

1. "Here in Your Bedroom" – 3:12
2. "Nothing to Prove" (Feldmann, Charlie Paulson) – 2:33
3. "Pictures (Live Version)" – 2:20

== Charts ==
Chart (1996)	Peak position
Canada Alternative 30 (RPM)	11
US Modern Rock Tracks (Billboard)	5
US Hot 100 Airplay (Billboard)	47
