= We Are the Air =

Studio album by Josephine Collective
- Released: June 24, 2008
- Recorded: February 2006 – October 2007
- Genre: Rock
- Length: 41:18
- Label: Warner Bros.
- Producer: John Feldmann

Josephine Collective chronology
Living (2007)	We Are the Air (2008)

We Are the Air is the first full-length album by the band Josephine Collective. It was digitally released on June 24, 2008 by Warner Bros. Records. The album was produced by John Feldmann (Goldfinger) in three sessions from February 2006 to October 2007. The title track, "We Are the Air", was recorded and produced by Brandon Paddock at Covenant Studios in Kansas City, Missouri.

== Track listing ==
1. "Living" – 3:14
2. "Crack My Heart" – 3:49
3. "Lye" – 2:57
4. "We Killed the American Dream" 3:42
5. "Clementine" – 3:18
6. "Scarlet" – 3:26
7. "Leave Me Love" – 3:32
8. "It's Like Rain" – 4:06
9. "Ivy League" – 3:43
10. "Let Go" – 3:39
11. "Pray for Rain" – 3:42
12. "We Are the Air" – 5:50
