= Living (EP) =

Living EP

EP by Josephine Collective
- Released: July 10, 2007
- Genre: Rock
- Length: 11:04
- Label: Warner Bros.
- Producer: John Feldmann

Josephine Collective chronology
| Summer Demos 2006 (2006) | Living EP (2007) | We Are The Air (2008) |

The Living EP is the debut recording by emo pop band, Josephine Collective, and was released on July 10, 2007 by Warner Bros. Records. Produced by John Feldmann (Goldfinger) it is a "perfect blend of stuck-in-your-head choruses and smooth melodies". "Living" is the prelude to Josephine Collective's debut album, We Are the Air.

== Reception ==
Melodic Net's Kaj Roth stated the EP "features 4 strong tracks in the emo vein, the songs are well crafted and the big budget production helps a lot because then they can compete with My Chemical Romance and The Used on the charts."

In an article for The Sun News, lead singer, Dillon Devoe, said "It's a song that I really love. It's a song I've played a million times and the story behind that one is don't do drugs. So many people think that's what rock 'n' roll's about. You have to escape from your everyday because you don't get to live it the way you want to, and the only real escape is to be happy with who you are and where you are all of the time."

== Track listing ==
1. "Living" - 3:14
2. "Lye" - 2:57
3. "Crack My Heart" - 3:49
4. "We Killed the American Dream" - 3:39
