= Turn the Radio Off =

Studio album by Reel Big Fish
- Released: August 13, 1996
- Recorded: April–May 1996
- Studios: Media Ventures, Santa Monica, California
- Genre: Ska punk
- Length: 42:37
- Label: Mojo
- Producers: Jay Rifkin; John Avila

Reel Big Fish chronology
Everything Sucks (1995)	Turn the Radio Off (1996)	Keep Your Receipt EP (1997)

Reel Big Fish studio chronology
Everything Sucks (1995)	Turn the Radio Off (1996)	Why Do They Rock So Hard? (1998)

Singles from Turn the Radio Off
- 1. "Sell Out" Released: August 13, 1996

Professional ratings
Review scores
Source	Rating
AllMusic	4.5/5 stars
Punktastic	5/5 stars

Turn the Radio Off is the second album by ska punk band Reel Big Fish. It was released in the U.S. in 1996 on Mojo Records.

The single "Sell Out" both received extensive radio airplay and had mainstream success during 1997. "Sell Out" also appeared on the soundtrack to the video games FIFA 2000, Aggressive Inline, and Disney's Extreme Skate Adventure. KROQ air personality Jed the Fish appears on the album cover held at gunpoint by frontman Aaron Barrett's then-girlfriend. The album has been certified gold by the Recording Industry Association of America.

Reel Big Fish later released a song titled "Turn the Radio Off" on their album We're Not Happy 'Til You're Not Happy, named after this album.

A limited press of the album was released on Vinyl on 13 May 2014. The rerelease was exclusive to Enjoy the Ride Records, with copies also being available through Hot Topic.

== Track listing ==
No.	Title	Writer(s)	Length
1.	"Sell Out"	Aaron Barrett; Scott Klopfenstein	3:47
2.	"Trendy"	Barrett; Matt Wong; Grant Barry	2:23
3.	"Join the Club"	Barrett; Tavis Werts	3:26
4.	"She Has a Girlfriend Now" (ft. Monique Powell of Save Ferris)	Barrett; Barrett; Klopfenstein	3:05
5.	"Snoop Dog, Baby"	Barrett; Andrew Gonzales; Werts	3:26
6.	"Beer"	Barrett	3:30
7.	"241"	Barrett; Klopfenstein; Werts; Gonzales; Barry; Wong; Dan Regan	2:40
8.	"Everything Sucks"	Barrett; Werts; Klopfenstein	2:41
9.	"S.R."	Barrett	1:26
10.	"Skatanic"	Barrett; Gonzales; Werts; Wong	3:15
11.	"All I Want Is More"	Barrett; Wong; Adam Polakoff	3:03
12.	"Nothin'"	Barrett	2:21
13.	"Say 'Ten'"	Barrett	2:11
14.	"I'll Never Be..."	Barrett; Gonzales; Polakoff	3:15
15.	"Alternative, Baby"	Barrett; Robert Quimby; Gonzales; Polakoff	2:57
16.	"Cool Ending" (Hidden track; begins with 2:00 silence)	Barrett	3:57

=== Songs From Everything Sucks ===
Over half of the songs are re-recorded versions of songs from RBF's first album Everything Sucks:

- "Cool Ending" (an acoustic version of "I'm Cool")
- "Join the Club"
- "I'll Never Be"
- "Trendy"
- "Skatanic"
- "Say Ten"
- "Beer"
- "All I Want Is More" (originally titled "Fuck Yourself")
- "Snoop Dog, Baby"
- "S.R." (appeared on the original pressing of Everything Sucks, but not the Mojo re-release)

Oddly, the song "Everything Sucks" was not on the album Everything Sucks and may have been written after Everything Sucks was released. Similarly, a song titled "Turn the Radio Off" would appear on the band's 2005 album, We're Not Happy 'Til You're Not Happy. Aaron Barrett has stated that he had planned to have a song on each album named for the previously released album. He claims that this idea eventually fell apart.

== Personnel ==
=== Reel Big Fish ===
- Aaron Barrett - vocals and guitar
- Grant Barry - trombone
- Andrew Gonzales - drums
- Scott Klopfenstein - trumpet and vocals
- Dan Regan - trombone
- Tavis Werts - trumpet
- Matt Wong - bass

=== Guest Musicians ===
- Isaiah Owens - keyboard
- Monique Powell - vocals on "She Has a Girlfriend Now"
- Efren Santana - saxophone
- Jesse Wilder - background vocals
- Kevin Globerman - background vocals
- Vince Pileggi - background vocals
- Michael Shaw - background vocals

=== Production ===
- Jay Rifkin - producer
- John Avila - producer
- Slamm Andrews - engineer
- Kevin Globerman - engineer
- Stephen Marcussen - mastering
- Patrick McDowell - A&R
- Aaron Barrett - cover concept
- Vince Pileggi - cover concept
- Carla Yacenda - "girl with gun"
- Jed the Fish - "disc jockey"
- Sheryl Nields - photography
- Reggie Casagrande - assistant

== Charts ==
Chart (1997)	Peak position
US Billboard 200	57

== Notes ==
- The album lists the song "In the Pit" under the Writer's credits section, although "In the Pit" is not on the album. This song would later appear on the Teen Beef split 7-inch with Goldfinger and later on Why Do They Rock So Hard? as "Thank You for Not Moshing" with some minor lyrical changes.
- The cover of a "clean" version of the album is a blank white field with just the band's name, the name of the album and the text of the First Amendment, incorrectly identified as "Article 1" with a typographic error: "readiness of grievances".
