= Josephine Collective =

American emo pop band

- Origin: Johnson County, Kansas, USA
- Genres: Emo pop
- Years active: 2004–2009
- Label: Warner Bros. Records (former)
- Past members: Lili Redwine (Keyboard); Colby Logback (Bass); Jared Bond (Drums); Joel Smith (Drums); Alexander Sandate (Vocals/Drums); Craig Martin "Chelsea's Brother" Swank (Guitar); Damon Baltuska (Guitar); Dillon Teague DeVoe (Vocals)
- Website: Official Website

Josephine Collective was an emo pop band from Johnson County, Kansas. In 2006, the band, formerly known as Josephine and, previously, Josephine Love Letter, was officially named Josephine Collective. The band signed to Warner Bros. Records after John Feldmann had been introduced to their music via Myspace and invited them to open for his band, Goldfinger. John Feldmann produced their first EP entitled Living EP which was released in 2007. Josephine Collective also recorded their first full-length album with Feldmann in Los Angeles, CA. The album, We Are the Air, was released for digital download on June 24, 2008. The band toured with fellow Warner Bros. Records act, The Used, in 2007 and with Story of the Year and Madina Lake in 2008. They also performed at both the 2008 Bamboozle Left Festival in California, and the 2008 Bamboozle Festival in New Jersey.

Starting in mid-2008 the band went through a number of changes. Lili Redwine, the band's keyboard player left Josephine Collective in early 2008 to focus on her solo career via the music production alias "Fire For Effect". The band agreed not to replace her, leaving them with six members. She went on to start the Sea Punk movement. In early October the band was released from their contract with Warner Bros. for complaining about lack of promotion and the way that their album was released, and Colby Logback (Bass) and Jared Bond (Drums) also left the band, leaving four remaining members. Alex Sandate (Vocals) then took over for Jared on drums, and Dillon Devoe (Vocals) took up the bass duties.

On May 23, 2009, Josephine Collective played their last concert at Kansas City's Beaumont Club. Dillon Devoe and Alex Sandate announced that it was their time to end, and they were all focusing on other projects.

On January 23, 2010, the band played their "last-hurrah" reunion show at the Beaumont Club in Kansas City.

== Discography ==
=== Albums ===
Year	Title	Label	Chart Positions
Year	Title	Label	US 200
2008	We Are The Air	Warner Bros. Records	—

=== EPs ===
Year	Title	Label	Chart Positions
Year	Title	Label	US 200
2007	Living	Warner Bros. Records	—
