= Stomping Ground =

2000 studio album by Goldfinger

Studio album by Goldfinger
- Released: March 28, 2000
- Recorded: 1999–2000
- Genres: Pop-punk; ska punk
- Length: 42:09
- Label: Mojo/Jive
- Producers: John Feldmann; Tim Palmer; Jay Rifkin

Goldfinger chronology
Hang-Ups (1997)	Stomping Ground (2000)	Open Your Eyes (2002)

Singles from Stomping Ground
- 1. "99 Red Balloons" Released: 2000; 2. "Counting The Days" Released: 2000

Professional ratings
Review scores
Source	Rating
AllMusic	4/5 stars
Rock Hard	6.5/10
Wall of Sound	65/100

Stomping Ground is the third studio album by American punk rock band Goldfinger, released on March 28, 2000. It was produced by Tim Palmer and John Feldmann and mixed by Tim Palmer. The song "The End of the Day" contains a brief sample from the Dead Kennedys song "Nazi Punks Fuck Off".

== Release ==
Stomping Ground was released in March 2000. In May 2000, the band went on tour with Ignite. In March 2001, the band embarked on a tour of Europe. In July and August 2001, the band went a co-headlining tour of the US with Reel Big Fish dubbed The Crouching Fish, Hidden Finger Tour, with support from Zebrahead, Home Grown, Mest, the Movielife and Rx Bandits. A second leg of this trek occurred in September and October 2001, with support from Mest, the Movielife, and Sugarcult.

== Track listing ==
All tracks are written by John Feldmann, except where noted.

No.	Title	Writer(s)	Length
1.	"I'm Down"		2:10
2.	"Pick a Fight"		3:25
3.	"Carry On"	Feldmann; Charlie Paulson; Chris Johnson	3:21
4.	"The End of the Day"		3:03
5.	"Don't Say Goodbye"		2:31
6.	"Counting the Days"		3:29
7.	"Bro"	Feldmann; Paulson	2:54
8.	"San Simeon"		3:22
9.	"You Think It's a Joke"	Feldmann; Tim Palmer	3:12
10.	"Forgiveness"		3:24
11.	"Margaret Ann"		2:34
12.	"Get Away"	Feldmann; Paulson	3:51
13.	"99 Red Balloons"	Uwe Fahrenkrog-Petersen; Carlo Karges; Kevin McAlea	3:49
14.	"Donut Dan"		0:42

Japanese bonus tracks
No.	Title	Writer(s)	Length
15.	"The Kids Are Alright" (The Who cover)	Pete Townshend
16.	"Man In A Suitcase" (The Police cover)	Sting
17.	"Nite Klub" (The Specials cover)	Jerry Dammers; The Specials
18.	"Rio" (Duran Duran cover)	Simon Le Bon; John Taylor; Roger Taylor; Andy Taylor; Nick Rhodes

== Personnel ==
- John Feldmann – vocals, guitar
- Charlie Paulson – guitar
- Dangerous Darrin Pfeiffer – drums, vocals
- Kelly LeMieux – bass, vocals

== Charts ==
Chart (2000)	Peak position
US Billboard 200	109
