= Hello Destiny... =

Studio album by Goldfinger
- Released: April 22, 2008
- Recorded: 2006–2007
- Genres: Pop-punk; ska; hardcore punk
- Length: 36:16
- Label: SideOneDummy
- Producer: John Feldmann

Goldfinger chronology
The Best of Goldfinger (2005)	Hello Destiny... (2008)	The Knife (2017)

Professional ratings
Review scores
Source	Rating
AllMusic	3/5 stars
Rock Hard	8/10
PopMatters	3/10

Hello Destiny... is the sixth album by American punk band Goldfinger, released on April 22, 2008, as their only album released through SideOneDummy Records. This album marks the return of guitarist Charlie Paulson, and at the same time is the last to feature Paulson (before his return in 2019), bassist Kelly LeMieux, and drummer Darrin Pfeiffer.

== Background and release ==
In January 2007, Goldfinger were finishing up their new album, which they were expecting to release in mid-2007.

On April 30, 2007, "Free Kevin Kjonaas" was posted on the band's Myspace profile. Following this, they appeared at the Wakestock festival in Canada. On December 22, 2007, Hello Destiny... was announced for release in four months' time. On January 2, 2008, a track titled "One More Time" was posted on the band's Myspace profile. On March 10, 2008, the album's artwork and track listing was posted online. Ten days later, "Get Up" was posted on their Myspace. In early April, the band appeared at the Bamboozle Left festival. Hello Destiny... was made available for streaming on April 15, 2008, before being released on April 22, 2008, through SideOneDummy Records. "One More Time" was released to radio on the same day. In April and May 2008, the band went on a brief West Coast tour. Between mid-June and early August, the band toured with Less Than Jake on their Sleep It Off Tour in the US. In February and March 2009, the band toured Australia as part of the Soundwave festival.

== Track listing ==
All songs are written by John Feldmann, except "War" co-written by Feldmann and Charlie Paulson.

No.	Title	Length
1.	"One More Time"	3:14
2.	"Get Up"	2:59
3.	"Goodbye"	2:36
4.	"Without Me"	3:14
5.	"If I'm Not Right"	3:35
6.	"War" (Featuring Ian Watkins of Lostprophets (Note: Watkins' vocals were replaced on the 2022 vinyl re-release of the album, likely by Kelly LeMieux.))	3:37
7.	"How Do You Do It"	2:11
8.	"Bury Me"	3:25
9.	"Not Amused" (Paulson)	1:49
10.	"Handjobs For Jesus" (Featuring Bert McCracken of The Used and Monique Powell of Save Ferris)	4:37
11.	"Free Kevin Kjonaas"	3:24
12.	"Julian" (Hidden track)	1:35

iTunes bonus track
No.	Title	Length
13.	"Smile"	3.31

Japanese bonus track
No.	Title	Length
13.	"Windows"	2:07

== Personnel ==
- John Feldmann – lead vocals, rhythm guitar, keyboards, percussion, string arrangements, sequencing, producer, mixing
- Charlie Paulson – lead guitar, vocals, lead vocals on "Not Amused"
- Kelly LeMieux – bass guitar, vocals
- Darrin Pfeiffer – drums

Additional personnel

- Matt Appleton – keyboards, horns, engineering
- Bert McCracken, Monique Powell, and Josephine Collective – guest vocals on "Handjobs for Jesus"
- Dillon Devoe, Alex Sandate, and Josephine Collective – guest vocals on "Goodbye"
- Ray Cappo – guest vocals on "Not Amused"
- Julian Feldmann – guest vocals on "Bury Me"
- Kyle Mooreman – additional engineering
- Joe Gastwirt – mastering

== Charts ==
Chart (2008)	Peak position
UK Independent Albums (Official Charts)	45
US Independent Albums (Billboard)	43
