= Never Look Back (Goldfinger album) =

Studio album by Goldfinger
- Released: December 4, 2020
- Genres: Punk rock; pop-punk; ska punk
- Length: 33:28
- Label: Big Noise
- Producers: John Feldmann; Dylan McLean (add.); Scot Stewart (add.); Jon Graber (add.); Reade Wolcott (add.)

Goldfinger chronology
The Knife (2017)	Never Look Back (2020)	Nine Lives (2026)

Singles from Never Look Back
- 1. "Wallflower" Released: October 9, 2020

Alternative cover
- Deluxe edition cover

Never Look Back is the eighth studio album by American punk band Goldfinger, released on December 4, 2020. It marks the return of original guitarist Charlie Paulson, who joins the previous album's lineup of guitarist/vocalist and founding member John Feldmann, lead guitarist Philip Sneed (Story of the Year), bassist Mike Herrera (MxPx, Mike Herrera's Tumbledown) and drummer Nick Gross. It is also their first album via Feldmann's own Big Noise Records. The album cover features the same woman seen at the cover of their 1996 debut.

A deluxe edition was released on August 5, 2022, which includes three re-recordings of their most popular tracks (featuring Avril Lavigne and Simon Neil of Biffy Clyro on vocals), as well as 4 new original tracks.

== Reception ==
Professional ratings
Review scores
Source	Rating
Wall of Sound	10/10 stars
Kerrang!	4/5 stars
Distorted Sound Mag	8/10 stars
Hysteria Magazine	7

Never Look Back received critical acclaim. Simon Valentine from Wall of Sound gave the album maximum score and finished his review by saying: "Honestly, after a brutal year Never Look Back has been a warm surprise from one of my favourite bands of late, and after a few repeated listens I think Goldfinger have shown excellent timing with one of the standout releases of 2020."

John Longbottom, from Kerrang!, noted that "musically, there's [...] just high-energy, feel-good punk rock that's as sure of itself as you'd expect from a band with 25-plus years under their belt. From turbo-charged, fist-pumping opener Infinite, to horn-laden, hands-in-the-air anthem The Best Life, all the component parts of a 24-carat Goldfinger record are present and accounted for." He gave it a score of 4/5 and finished his review saying that "ultimately, whichever way you cut it, Never Look Back encapsulates everything great about Goldfinger".

Writing for Distorted Sound Mag, Jack Fermor-Worrell said "the final result is a joyous release that, while not perfect, manages to both throw back to the band's classic days and still avoiding sounding overly dated or tired. [...] Never Look Back is a second home-run in a row for Goldfinger, and one fans of the anything pop-punk, ska-based or otherwise, are sure to find enjoyment in."

Jessica Deanne J from Hysteria Magazine commented that "it's nice that Goldfinger have kept their light, cheeky and youthful sound in Never Look Back, after being a band together for over twenty years."

== Track listing ==
Never Look Back - Standard edition
No.	Title	Writer(s)	Lead vocals	Length
1.	"Infinite"	John Feldmann; Charlie Paulson; Mike Herrera	Feldmann; Paulson; Herrera	2:25
2.	"The City"	Feldmann; Nate Albert	Feldmann	3:19
3.	"Wallflower"	Feldmann	Feldmann	2:23
4.	"California on My Mind"	Feldmann	Feldmann	2:50
5.	"Nothing to Me"	Feldmann; Herrera	Feldmann; Herrera	1:51
6.	"Good Guy"	Feldmann; Herrera	Feldmann; Herrera	2:35
7.	"The Best Life"	Feldmann	Feldmann	3:22
8.	"Careful What You Wish For" (featuring Monique Powell)	Feldmann; Powell; Simon Wilcox	Feldmann; Powell	2:51
9.	"Cannonball"	Feldmann	Feldmann	2:48
10.	"Golden Days"	Feldmann; Paulson	Feldmann	3:03
11.	"Dumb"	Feldmann	Feldmann	2:56
12.	"Standing on the Beach"	Feldmann; Herrera	Feldmann; Herrera	3:05
Total length:				33:28

Never Look Back - Deluxe edition bonus tracks
No.	Title	Writer(s)	Lead vocals	Length
13.	"Here in Your Bedroom (feat. Avril Lavigne)"	Feldmann; Paulson; Simon John Williams	Feldmann; Lavigne	3:12
14.	"Superman (feat. Simon Neil of Biffy Clyro)"	Feldmann; Paulson; Williams	Feldmann; Neil	3:08
15.	"99 Red Balloons" (Nena cover)	Uwe Fahrenkrog-Petersen; Joern Mac Alea; Carlo Karges; Kevin Joseph	Feldmann	3:37
16.	"3am"	Feldmann; Herrera; Nick Furlong; Travis Barker	Feldmann; Herrera	2:41
17.	"Searchlight"	Feldmann; Herrera; Barker	Feldmann; Herrera	1:53
18.	"Perfect"	Feldmann; Herrera; Barker	Feldmann; Herrera	2:38
19.	"Broken In Paradise"	Feldmann; Herrera; Barker	Feldmann; Herrera	2:41
Total length:				53:24

== Personnel ==
Credits adapted from sources.

Goldfinger

- John Feldmann – lead vocals, rhythm guitar
- Charlie Paulson – lead guitar, vocals
- Mike Herrera – bass guitar, vocals
- Philip Sneed – lead and rhythm guitars, backing vocals
- Nick Gross – drums

Additional musicians

- Monique Powell – co-lead vocals on "Careful What You Wish For"
- Avril Lavigne – co-lead vocals on "Here In Your Bedroom"
- Simon Neil – vocals on "Superman"
- Travis Barker – drums
- Matt Appleton – horns
- Reade Wolcott – additional guitars and additional vocals
- Jon Graber – additional guitars on "The Best Life", organ on "California on My Mind," "The Best Life," and "Dumb"

Production

- John Feldmann – producer, engineer, mixing
- Jon Graber – additional production, engineer, mixing
- Reade Wolcott – additional production, engineer, mixing
- Dylan McClean – additional production, engineer, mixing
- Scot Stewart – additional production, engineer, mixing
- Josh Thornberry – assistant engineer
- Jake Magness – assistant engineer
- Ted Jensen – mastering
