= The Ernies =

American rock band from Richmond

- Origin: Richmond, Virginia, U.S.
- Genres: Ska; alternative rock; rap rock; rap metal; nu metal
- Years active: 1994–2001, 2013
- Labels: Bob, Mojo
- Past members: Will Hummel, Matt Goves, D. Hayes Smith, Mike Hughes, Stefan Demetriadis, Chris Bondi, Brian Knight, Damian Holton, Dave Warren, Steve Bider, Tom Hummel, Jeff Fuquay, Tom Martin, T., Jimmy McAvoy, Heath Losick, Derrick Dorsey

The Ernies were an American alternative rock/ska punk band from Richmond, Virginia. They released two albums on an independent label before signing to Mojo Records and releasing their third album entitled Meson Ray.

== History ==
The Ernies were formed in 1994 by four students of Virginia Commonwealth University: Will Hummel, Tom Martin, Matt Goves, and Hayes Smith. Hayes majored in music education, learning the saxophone and the bassoon, and Matt majored in music performance, focusing on percussion. Will studied English, and was especially influenced by the Modernists of the early 20th century.

The Ernies released their self-titled debut album on October 1, 1995. This album featured a three-piece horn section consisting of Steve Bider on alto saxophone, Stefan Demetriadis on trombone, and Hayes Smith on the baritone saxophone. In 1995, bassist Mike Hughes joined the band.

On May 12, 1997, The Ernies released their second album, Dropping Science. This album diverged from the pure ska style present on their previous album. The first track, "Jive", addresses the style change with lyrics like "We're not ska-core or reggae, jazz or funk, we're not hip-hop or rock or pop" and "to pacify those of you who need a label, call it what you want, we know you'll kick it if you're able". Without Steve Bider in the band, the horn section on Dropping Science consisted only of Stefan Demetriadis on trombone, and Hayes Smith on the baritone saxophone.

=== Mojo Records and beyond ===
Chris Bondi joined the band in 1997, playing the turntables and theremin. While playing a show in Los Angeles during a tour across the United States, The Ernies were discovered by a record executive and signed to Mojo Records. Meson Ray was released on Mojo Records on April 20, 1999. With trombonist Stefan Demetriadis no longer in the band, the only horn section remaining for this release was Hayes Smith on a variety of saxophones.

A remix of the song "Motivate" appeared during a scene in the movie BASEketball. This version of the song also appeared on the BASEketball soundtrack, released by Mojo Records.

The song "Here and Now" was featured in the video game Tony Hawk's Pro Skater in 1999, and has also been featured on various television commercials, including an advertisement for the American television show CSI: Miami, the Australian television series Dangerous, and a U.S. trailer of Cowboy Bebop: The Movie (Knockin' on Heaven's Door) in 2003. Sony also used the song for numerous in-store and DVD advertisements promoting Blu-ray.

On June 7, 2006, World Wrestling Entertainment featured the song "Polarized" as the theme for the one-time special "WWE vs. ECW: Head to Head episode". They also used "Here and Now" as the theme song to the DVD version of Survivor Series 2003.The song "Organism" was the opening theme for Wrestling Society X. The songs "Here and Now" and "Polarized" are also featured in a number of promotional training videos for the 2007 comedy Balls of Fury; specifically the "Backhand Punch" and "Forehand Block" videos. In mid-2008 TGI Fridays used "Here and Now" as a background song for a run of television commercials. The song "Polarized" was featured as part of the in-game music of the 2018 video game Far Cry 5.

Hayes Smith was a guest saxophonist, recording with The Pietasters on their 2002 album Turbo. He is now playing bass and sax for a Dallas-based band called Roy Bennett.

Frontman Will Hummel currently works as a district manager for G by Guess and released a rocksteady-style solo project.

Will Hummel, Matt Goves and Mike Hughes reunited and performed songs from Meson Ray together on January 3, 2013, at The Camel in Richmond, Virginia, along with Stefan Demetriadis and Chris Bondi.

== Band members ==
=== Last line-up ===
- Will Hummel - vocals, guitar (1994-2001, 2013)
- Matt Goves - drums (1994-2001, 2013)
- Hayes Smith - saxophone, backing vocals (1994-2001, 2013)
- Mike Hughes - guitar (1995-1996) bass, vocals (1996-2001, 2013)
- Chris Bondi - turntables, theremin (1997-2001, 2013) (died 2020){}

=== Former members ===
- Stefan Demetriadis - trombone (1994-1999)
- Steve Bider (1994-1995)
- Brian Knight
- Damian Holton
- Dave Warren
- Tom Hummel
- Tom Martin (1994-1996)
- Jeff Fuquay
- Jimmy McAvoy
- Heath Losick
- Derek Dorsey

== Discography ==
=== Albums ===
Title	Date of Release	Record Label
The Ernies	1995	Bob Records
Dropping Science	1997	Bob Records
Meson Ray	1999	Mojo Records
