= Disconnection Notice =

Studio album by Goldfinger
- Released: February 15, 2005
- Recorded: 2004
- Genre: Pop punk
- Length: 36:50
- Label: Maverick
- Producer: John Feldmann

Goldfinger chronology
Open Your Eyes (2002)	Disconnection Notice (2005)	The Best of Goldfinger (2005)

Singles from Disconnection Notice
- 1. "Wasted" Released: 2005; 2. "I Want" Released: 2005; 3. "Stalker" Released: 2005

Professional ratings
Review scores
Source	Rating
AllMusic	3/5 stars
IGN	4.5/10
PopMatters	(4/10)
Rolling Stone	2/5 stars

Disconnection Notice is the fifth studio album by American punk rock band Goldfinger. This was the band's last album to feature former Ünloco guitarist Brian Arthur; original guitarist Charlie Paulson returned after Arthur's departure.

== Release ==
On July 27, 2004, it was announced that the band's next album would be titled Disconnection Notice; in addition to this, its track listing was posted online. "My Everything" was made available for streaming through the band's website on August 5, 2004. In November 2004, the album was announced for release in February the following year. In addition, "Wasted" was posted on the band's PureVolume profile, before being released to radio on January 25, 2005. On February 1, 2005, the music video for "Wasted" was posted online. In February and March, the group embarked on a US tour with the Start, City Sleeps and Bottom Line. Disconnection Notice was made available for streaming on February 9, 2005, through VH1's website, before being released six days later. "Stalker" was released to radio on May 17, 2005. In September and October 2005, they toured across New Zealand and Australia with Reel Big Fish and the Matches. They opened 2006 with a co-headlining West Coast US tour with Reel Big Fish, dubbed the Deep Freeze Tour; they were supported by Zebrahead and Bottom Line. Guitarist Charlie Paulson, who had left in 2001, re-joined the band for the trek. The band appeared at the Groezrock festival in April 2006.

== Track listing ==
All songs are written by John Feldmann, except for "Wasted" and "Ocean Size" by John Feldmann and Benji Madden.

No.	Title	Length
1.	"My Everything" (feat. Ely Dye of City Sleeps)	2:38
2.	"Wasted" (feat. Quinn Allman of The Used on guitar)	3:09
3.	"Ocean Size" (feat. Bert McCracken of The Used)	2:54
4.	"Uncomfortable"	2:37
5.	"Too Many Nights"	3:08
6.	"Damaged"	2:56
7.	"Behind the Mask" (feat. Dan Marsala of Story of the Year)	2:58
8.	"I Want" (feat. Philip Sneed of Story of the Year)	2:21
9.	"Iron Fist"	2:54
10.	"Walk Away"	3:38
11.	"Faith"	2:19
12.	"Stalker"	2:46

Japanese edition bonus tracks
No.	Title	Length
13.	"Time"	3:41
14.	"Find a Way"	2:44
15.	"Get By"	3:11

== Personnel ==
- John Feldmann – vocals, rhythm guitar
- Brian Arthur – lead guitar
- Kelly LeMieux – bass
- Darrin Pfeiffer – drums

== Notes ==
- Track No. 1, "My Everything", was featured on the soundtrack of the video game SSX on Tour.
- Track No. 8, "I Want", was featured on the soundtrack of the video games Burnout Revenge and Burnout Legends.
- Track No. 7, "Behind The Mask" was originally called "FBI" (On Advance CD) but was renamed for the final retail release.
- Track No. 9, "Iron Fist", was written due to the raid that took place on Feldmann's house.
