= The Craving (album) =

Studio album by MD.45
- Released: July 23, 1996
- Genres: Heavy metal; punk rock
- Length: 40:41
- Labels: Slab Records, Capitol Records
- Producer: Dave Mustaine

Professional ratings
Review scores
| Source | Rating |
|---|---|
| AllMusic | link |

The Craving is the debut and only album by American rock band MD.45, released on July 23, 1996, on Slab Records, a subsidiary of Capitol Records. A remastered version was released in 2004 on Capitol Records which features the original vocals by Lee Ving removed and re-recorded by the band's guitarist, Dave Mustaine. Mustaine stated that he replaced Ving's original vocal tracks "to entice interest from Megadeth fans who might have overlooked the original."

Many of the songs from the album were originally written for Megadeth, but due to the band almost breaking up, Mustaine decided to start a side project instead.

On June 24, 2023, Megadeth and Lee Ving performed the song "Nothing is Something" live at a concert in Tampa, Florida. This marks the only time an MD.45 song has been performed live.

== Track listing ==
| No. | Title | Lyrics | Music | Length |
|---|---|---|---|---|
| 1. | "Hell's Motel" | Dave Mustaine, Lee Ving | Mustaine | 4:41 |
| 2. | "Day the Music Died" | Mustaine | Mustaine | 4:37 |
| 3. | "Fight Hate" | Ving | Mustaine | 2:50 |
| 4. | "Designer Behavior" | Mustaine | Mustaine | 3:34 |
| 5. | "The Creed" | Mustaine | Mustaine | 5:00 |
| 6. | "My Town" | Mustaine, Ving | Mustaine | 3:07 |
| 7. | "Voices" | Mustaine, Ving | Mustaine | 3:36 |
| 8. | "Nothing Is Something" | Mustaine | Mustaine, Ving, LeMieux, DeGrasso | 3:52 |
| 9. | "Hearts Will Bleed" | Ving | Mustaine | 3:24 |
| 10. | "No Pain" | Ving | Mustaine | 2:51 |
| 11. | "Roadman" | Ving | Mustaine | 3:08 |

2004 bonus tracks
| No. | Title | Lyrics | Music | Length |
|---|---|---|---|---|
| 12. | "Chutney" | Mustaine | Mustaine | 4:22 |
| 13. | "Segue" | (instrumental) | Raymond Scott (adaptation from "Powerhouse") | 1:24 |
| 14. | "The Creed" (Megadeth demo) | Mustaine | Mustaine | 5:20 |

== Personnel ==
Original release

- Lee Ving – vocals, harmonica
- Dave Mustaine – guitar
- Kelly LeMieux – bass
- Jimmy DeGrasso – drums

2004 remix and remaster

- Dave Mustaine – vocals, guitar
- Kelly LeMieux – bass
- Jimmy DeGrasso – drums

Megadeth (performs only on "The Creed" (Megadeth Demo))

- Dave Mustaine – vocals, guitar
- Marty Friedman – guitar
- Dave Ellefson – bass
- Nick Menza – drums

Production

- Produced by Dave Mustaine
- Recorded by Billy Moss, assisted by Aaron Carey
- Mixed and vocals recorded by Max Norman and Dave Mustaine, assisted by Mike Tacci and Laurence Jacobson
- Mastered by Wally Traugott

2004 remix and remaster

- Produced by Dave Mustaine
- Mixed by Ralph Patlan and Dave Mustaine
- Engineered by Ralph Patlan, assisted by Lance Dean
- Edited by Lance Dean and Scott "Sarge" Harrison, assisted by Bo Caldwell and Dave McRobb
- Mastered by Tom Baker
