= 2021 in downloadable songs for the Rock Band series =

- Songs released: 110
- Packs released: 3
- Albums released: 0

The Rock Band series of music video games supports downloadable songs for the Xbox One and PlayStation 4 versions through the consoles' respective online services. Users can download songs on a track-by-track basis, with many of the tracks also offered as part of a "song pack" or complete album at a discounted rate.

== List of songs released in 2021 ==
The following table lists the available songs for the Rock Band series released in 2021. All songs available in packs are also available as individual song downloads on the same date, unless otherwise noted. Dates listed are the initial release of songs on PlayStation Network and Xbox Live.

Starting from October 6, 2015, all music added to the downloadable content catalog is exclusive to Rock Band 4. In addition, due to changes in the charting format and gameplay of Rock Band 4, the released songs no longer support keyboard or Pro guitar and bass (future downloadable content will continue to support vocal harmonies and Pro drum charts), and most songs no longer display "family friendly" or "supervision recommended" ratings. Downloadable content from previous Rock Band titles (excepting The Beatles: Rock Band) is forward-compatible in Rock Band 4 within the same system family (Xbox 360 downloads are usable in the Xbox One version and PlayStation 3 downloads are usable in the PlayStation 4 version) at no additional cost.

Song title	Artist	Year	Genre	Single / Pack name	Release date
"Anthem Part Two"	Blink-182	2001	Punk	Single	Jan 7, 2021
"Hanging by a Moment"	Lifehouse	2000	Rock	Single	Jan 7, 2021
"Let The Games Begin" (Note: Song was previously released as part of the Rock Band Network.)	Anarbor	2010	Alternative	Single	Jan 14, 2021
"bloody valentine"	Machine Gun Kelly	2020	Alternative	Single	Jan 14, 2021
"All Downhill from Here"	New Found Glory	2004	Punk	New Found Glory 01	Jan 21, 2021
"Greatest of All Time"	New Found Glory	2020	Punk	New Found Glory 01	Jan 21, 2021
"My Friends Over You"	New Found Glory	2002	Punk	New Found Glory 01	Jan 21, 2021
"To the Stage"	Asking Alexandria	2011	Metal	Single	Jan 28, 2021
"Visitor"	Of Monsters and Men	2020	Alternative	Single	Jan 28, 2021
"Sick, Sick, Sick"	Bayside	2011	Alternative	Single	Feb 4, 2021
"ily (i love you baby)"	Surf Mesa ft. Emilee	2019	Pop/Dance/Electronic	Single	Feb 4, 2021
"Take Me Home, Country Roads"	John Denver	1971	Country	Single	Feb 4, 2021
"Let My Love Open the Door"	Pete Townshend	1980	New Wave	Single	Feb 11, 2021
"The Bad Touch"	Bloodhound Gang	1999	Pop/Dance/Electronic	Single	Feb 11, 2021
"Fatal Illusion"	Megadeth	2016	Metal	Single	Feb 18, 2021
"Smash the Control Machine"	Otep	2009	Metal	Single	Feb 18, 2021
"Dreamchaser"	Amberian Dawn	2008	Metal	Single	Feb 25, 2021
"Help I'm Alive"	Metric	2009	Alternative	Single	Feb 25, 2021
"Superman"	Goldfinger	1997	Reggae/Ska	Single	Mar 4, 2021
"Younger Lungs"	Less Than Jake	2012	Reggae/Ska	Single	Mar 4, 2021
"Demon Woman"	Flight of the Conchords	2009	Novelty	Single	Mar 11, 2021
"Good Morning Tucson"	Jonathan Coulton	2011	Rock	Single	Mar 11, 2021
"Alaska"	Between the Buried and Me	2005	Metal	Single	Mar 18, 2021
"The Order"	Children of Nova	2009	Prog	Single	Mar 18, 2021
"Aspiration"	After the Burial	2009	Metal	Single	Mar 25, 2021
"Way Less Sad"	AJR	2021	Pop-Rock	Single	Mar 25, 2021
"My Ex's Best Friend"	Machine Gun Kelly & blackbear	2020	Alternative	Single	Apr 1, 2021
"Leaderless and Self Enlisted"	Norma Jean	2010	Metal	Single	Apr 1, 2021
"Dear Maria, Count Me In"	All Time Low	2007	Emo	Single	Apr 8, 2021
"The One You Want"	The Get Up Kids	2004	Rock	Single	Apr 8, 2021
"Mindreader"	A Day to Remember	2021	Punk	A Day to Remember 01	Apr 15, 2021
"Paranoia"	A Day to Remember	2016	Punk	A Day to Remember 01	Apr 15, 2021
"Resentment"	A Day to Remember	2021	Punk	A Day to Remember 01	Apr 15, 2021
"Therefore I Am"	Billie Eilish	2020	Pop/Dance/Electronic	Single	Apr 22, 2021
"Heimdalsgate Like a Promethean Curse"	of Montreal	2007	Indie Rock	Single	Apr 22, 2021
"Running With The Wild Things"	Against The Current	2016	Pop-Rock	Single	Apr 29, 2021
"Tree Village"	Dance Gavin Dance	2009	Indie Rock	Single	Apr 29, 2021
"Kokko - Eagle of Fire"	Amberian Dawn	2009	Metal	Single	May 6, 2021
"Self Destructor"	Chevelle	2021	Rock	Single	May 6, 2021
"Someone to You"	BANNERS	2019	Alternative	Single	May 13, 2021
"Miracle"	Nonpoint	2010	Rock	Single	May 13, 2021
"All Bodies"	Between the Buried and Me	2005	Metal	Single	May 20, 2021
"Cheyne Stokes"	Chelsea Grin	2010	Metal	Single	May 20, 2021
"Who Do You Love?"	George Thorogood & the Destroyers	1978	Classic Rock	Single	May 27, 2021
"Wild Thing"	The Troggs	1966	Rock	Single	May 27, 2021
"Shipwrecked"	Alestorm	2011	Metal	Single	Jun 3, 2021
"Heat Waves"	Glass Animals	2020	Alternative	Single	Jun 3, 2021
"What's Left Of Me"	Blessthefall	2009	Alternative	Single	Jun 10, 2021
"And So It Went"	The Pretty Reckless ft. Tom Morello	2021	Rock	Single	Jun 10, 2021
"The Complexity of Light"	Children of Nova	2009	Prog	Single	Jun 17, 2021
"Follow You"	Imagine Dragons	2021	Alternative	Single	Jun 17, 2021
"Astronaut in the Ocean"	Masked Wolf	2019	Hip-Hop/Rap	Single	Jun 24, 2021
"Astronaut in the Ocean"	Our Last Night	2021	Metal	Single	Jun 24, 2021
"Rich Girl"	Hall & Oates	1976	Pop-Rock	Single	Jul 1, 2021
"All My Favorite Songs"	Weezer	2021	Alternative	Single	Jul 1, 2021
"Too Little Too Late"	A Skylit Drive	2011	Alternative	Single	Jul 8, 2021
"Comfort Eagle"	Cake	2001	Alternative	Single	Jul 8, 2021
"Roll the Dice"	Damone	2008	Rock	Single	Jul 15, 2021
"Rats"	Ghost	2018	Metal	Single	Jul 15, 2021
"Energy"	The Apples in Stereo	2007	Pop-Rock	Single	Jul 22, 2021
"Sell Out"	Reel Big Fish	1996	Reggae/Ska	Single	Jul 22, 2021
"The Great Salt Lake"	Band of Horses	2006	Indie Rock	Single	Jul 29, 2021
"I'm Amazed"	My Morning Jacket	2008	Alternative	Single	Jul 29, 2021
"Far Too Near"	AFI	2021	Rock	Single	Aug 5, 2021
"Shake Me Up"	HOUNDS	2017	Rock	Single	Aug 5, 2021
"Devil On My Shoulder"	Kelsy Karter	2020	Rock	Single	Aug 5, 2021
"Kids Of Summer"	Mayday Parade	2021	Rock	Single	Aug 5, 2021
"Tailspin"	Calling All Captains	2021	Rock	Single	Aug 12, 2021
"The Bird and the Worm"	The Used	2007	Emo	Single	Aug 12, 2021
"take my breath away // noose"	Capstan	2021	Rock	Single	Aug 19, 2021
"We Are Between"	Modest Mouse	2021	Indie Rock	Single	Aug 19, 2021
"Let the Bad Times Roll"	The Offspring	2021	Punk	Single	Aug 26, 2021
"You're Gonna Go Far, Kid"	The Offspring	2008	Punk	Single	Aug 26, 2021
"Hurricane"	I Prevail	2019	Metal	Single	Sep 2, 2021
"Nowhere Generation"	Rise Against	2021	Punk	Single	Sep 2, 2021
"Here's to the Night"	Eve 6	2000	Alternative	Single	Sep 9, 2021
"estella//"	KennyHoopla ft. Travis Barker	2021	Alternative	Single	Sep 9, 2021
"Drunk (And I Don't Wanna Go Home)"	Elle King & Miranda Lambert	2021	Alternative	Single	Sep 16, 2021
"Native Tongue"	My Kid Brother	2020	Alternative	Single	Sep 16, 2021
"good 4 u"	Olivia Rodrigo	2021	Pop-Rock	Single	Sep 23, 2021
"Freaks"	Surf Curse	2013	Indie Rock	Single	Sep 23, 2021
"Animals"	Architects	2021	Metal	Single	Sep 30, 2021
"Heat Above"	Greta Van Fleet	2021	Rock	Single	Sep 30, 2021
"Girl Scout Cookies" (Note: Song is available at no cost.)	Mom Jeans.	2016	Emo	6th Anniversary Free DLC Pack	Oct 6, 2021
"Like No Surprise"	Oldsoul	2020	Alternative	6th Anniversary Free DLC Pack	Oct 6, 2021
"The Title Track"	Origami Angel	2019	Emo	6th Anniversary Free DLC Pack	Oct 6, 2021
"Cosmic Thrill Seeking Forever"	Prince Daddy & The Hyena	2019	Alternative	6th Anniversary Free DLC Pack	Oct 6, 2021
"I Wanna Dance with Somebody (Who Loves Me)"	Fall Out Boy	2018	Pop-Rock	Single	Oct 14, 2021
"Blue Monday"	Orgy	1998	Nu-Metal	Single	Oct 14, 2021
"Africa"	Weezer	2019	Alternative	Single	Oct 14, 2021
"Back Through Time"	Alestorm	2011	Metal	Single	Oct 21, 2021
"Freakshow"	HourCast	2010	Rock	Single	Oct 21, 2021
"Creepy Doll"	Jonathan Coulton	2006	Pop-Rock	Single	Oct 28, 2021
"Time Warp"	Little Nell, Patricia Quinn & Richard O'Brien	1975	Glam	Single	Oct 28, 2021
"Flavor of the Weak"	American Hi-Fi	2001	Punk	Single	Nov 4, 2021
"Euphoria"	Angels & Airwaves	2021	Alternative	Single	Nov 4, 2021
"MONTERO (Call Me by Your Name)"	Lil Nas X	2021	Hip-Hop/Rap	Single	Nov 11, 2021
"A-O-K"	Tai Verdes	2021	Pop-Rock	Single	Nov 11, 2021
"Shimmer"	Fuel	1998	Rock	Single	Nov 18, 2021
"Pathkeeper"	Interloper	2021	Metal	Single	Nov 18, 2021
"Physical"	Olivia Newton-John	1981	Pop/Dance/Electronic	Single	Nov 23, 2021
"Paralyzed"	Sueco	2021	Hip-Hop/Rap	Single	Nov 23, 2021
"Peg"	Steely Dan	1977	Classic Rock	Single	Dec 2, 2021
"Grand Canyon"	The Wind and The Wave	2016	Indie Rock	Single	Dec 2, 2021
"Chelsea Dagger"	The Fratellis	2006	Alternative	Single	Dec 9, 2021
"The Call"	Ego Kill Talent	2021	Rock	Single	Dec 9, 2021
"I Can't Drive 55"	Sammy Hagar	1984	Rock	Single	Dec 16, 2021
"Rock You Like a Hurricane"	Scorpions	2011	Metal	Single	Dec 16, 2021
"Hazy Shade of Winter"	The Bangles	1987	Rock	Single	Dec 23, 2021
"Missing Piece"	Vance Joy	2021	Indie Rock	Single	Dec 23, 2021
"Cold Heart (PNAU Remix)"	Elton John - Dua Lipa	2021	Pop/Dance/Electronic	Single	Dec 30, 2021
"brutal"	Olivia Rodrigo	2021	Pop-Rock	Single	Dec 30, 2021
