= Nine Lives (Goldfinger album) =

Studio album by Goldfinger
- Released: January 23, 2026
- Recorded: 2025
- Studios: Foxy Studios, Los Angeles
- Genres: Pop-punk; ska punk
- Length: 31:36
- Label: Big Noise
- Producers: John Feldmann; Brian Lee; Scot Stewart (add.); Connor Daniel (add.); Dylan McLean (add.); Dan Trapp (add.); Zac Carper (add.)

Goldfinger chronology
Never Look Back (2020)	Nine Lives (2026)

Singles from Nine Lives
- 1. "Freaking Out A Bit" Released: July 11, 2025; 2. "Chasing Amy" Released: November 7, 2025

Professional ratings
Review scores
Source	Rating
Kerrang!	4/5 stars

Nine Lives (stylized in all caps) is the ninth studio album by the American rock band Goldfinger, released on January 23, 2026, via Big Noise Music. Nine Lives features a wide range of collaborators including Mark Hoppus, Jim Lindberg, Spencer Charnas, Fidlar, Iann Dior, and El Hefe.

Nine Lives does not feature any musical contributions from members Mike Herrera, Philip Sneed, or Nick Gross, although the three appear alongside Feldmann and Paulson in the album's booklet.

== Background and production ==
The album began production in 2025. The first track written for the album, "Derelict", stemmed from Feldmann collaborating with Spencer Charnas on new Ice Nine Kills material. In an interview with Rock Sound, Feldmann had stated a couple of songs from the album were originally tracks he had co-written with other artists; the tracks "Freaking Out A Bit" and "Lie in Bed" were originally written for Blink-182, and feature musical contributions from Mark Hoppus and Travis Barker.

"Freaking Out A Bit" was released July 11, 2025, as the first single. "Chasing Amy" was released as the second single later that year on November 7, with the band describing the track as "a personal anthem about love, time, and everything in-between." The album was officially announced on January 9, 2026, and released a few weeks later on January 23. The track "Derelict" was given a music video, which premiered February 26, 2026.

== Composition ==
Nine Lives has been described as a pop-punk and ska album. The track "Untouchable" incorporates hip-hop, while "The Punisher" is a banjo-based country track.

== Track listing ==
Nine Lives track listing
No.	Title	Writer(s)	Producer(s)	Length
1.	"Chasing Amy"	John Feldmann; Brian Lee; JP Clark	Feldmann; Lee; Scot Stewart^{[a]}; Connor Daniel^{[a]}	2:57
2.	"Freaking Out a Bit" (featuring Mark Hoppus)	Feldmann; Travis Barker; Mark Hoppus	Feldmann; Stewart^{[a]}; Dylan McLean^{[a]}	2:37
3.	"Last One Standing" (featuring Jim Lindberg)	Feldmann; Lee; Clark; Jim Lindberg	Feldmann; Lee; Daniel^{[a]}; Dan Trapp^{[a]}; Stewart^{[a]}	2:52
4.	"Derelict" (featuring Spencer Charnas)	Feldmann; Spencer Charnas; Lee; Clark	Feldmann; Lee; Daniel^{[a]}; Trapp^{[a]}; Stewart^{[a]}	2:00
5.	"Lie in Bed"	Feldmann; Barker; Hoppus	Feldmann; Daniel^{[a]}; Trapp^{[a]}; Stewart^{[a]}	2:43
6.	"Loser" (featuring Zac Carper)	Feldmann; Carper	Feldmann; Carper^{[a]}; Daniel^{[a]}; Trapp^{[a]}; Stewart^{[a]}	2:38
7.	"Untouchable" (featuring Iann Dior)	Feldmann; Michael Olmo; Derek "Mod Sun" Smith	Feldmann; Daniel^{[a]}; Stewart^{[a]}; McLean^{[a]}	2:52
8.	"John Lennon"	Feldmann; Lee; Clark	Feldmann; Lee; Daniel^{[a]}; Trapp^{[a]}; Stewart^{[a]}	2:02
9.	"Dynamite"	Feldmann; Lee; Clark	Feldmann; Lee; Daniel^{[a]}; Stewart^{[a]}; Trapp^{[a]}	2:55
10.	"Killswitch"	Feldmann; Lee; Clark	Feldmann; Lee; Daniel^{[a]}; Stewart^{[a]}; Trapp^{[a]}	2:55
11.	"The Punisher" (featuring El Hefe)	Feldmann; Lee; Clark; Aaron Abeyta	Feldmann; Lee; Daniel^{[a]}; Stewart^{[a]}; Trapp^{[a]}	2:31
12.	"College"	Feldmann	Feldmann; Daniel^{[a]}; Stewart^{[a]}; Trapp^{[a]}	3:15
Total length:				31:25

=== Notes ===
- All song titles are stylized in all caps.
- ^{^[a]} indicates an additional producer

== Personnel ==
Credits adapted from Tidal.

=== Goldfinger ===
- John Feldmann – vocals, guitars, programming, bass guitar, keys, synths, drums
- Charlie Paulson – guitar (tracks 1–5, 9–11)

=== Additional performers ===
- Mark Hoppus – vocals (2), bass guitar (2, 5)
- Travis Barker – drums (1–3, 5, 7)
- Jim Lindberg – vocals (3)
- Spencer Charnas – vocals (4)
- Zac Carper – vocals, guitar, programming (6)
- Iann Dior – vocals (7)
- El Hefe – guitar (11)
- Connor Daniel – programming; guitar (1, 5–10); bass guitar (6, 8–10)
- Scot Stewart – programming; guitar (2–5, 8–11); keys, synths (6–8, 11); bass guitar (3, 4, 7–11)
- Dylan McLean – programming
- Dan Trapp – programming; drums (4, 8–11)
- Brian Lee – bass guitar (1, 3), acoustic guitar (8, 12), guitar (3)

=== Technical personnel ===
- John Feldmann – producer, mixing, engineering
- Connor Daniel – engineering, mixing, additional production
- Scot Stewart – engineering, mixing, additional production
- Zac Carper – producer (6)
- Brian Lee – producer (1, 3, 4, 8–11)
- Dan Trapp – engineering, additional production
- Ted Jensen – mastering

== Charts ==
Chart performance for Nine Lives
Chart (2026)	Peak position
UK Album Downloads (Official Charts)	99
