= Jed the Fish =

American disc jockey (1955–2025)

- Born: Edwin Jed Fish Gould III; July 15, 1955; Los Angeles, California, U.S.
- Died: April 14, 2025 (aged 69); Pasadena, California, U.S.
- Education: University of Southern California
- Career
- Style: Disc jockey
- Country: United States

Edwin Jed Fish Gould III (July 15, 1955 – April 14, 2025), known to radio listeners as Jed the Fish, was an American disc jockey who hosted afternoon drive on KROQ-FM in Los Angeles, from 1978 to 2012. He interviewed alternative rock acts such as Brian Eno, Danny Elfman, David Bowie, Sting, and Elvis Costello. An early supporter of new wave and Alternative rock bands, Jed the Fish is reputed to have been the first U.S. DJ to play Depeche Mode, Duran Duran, and The Pretenders, and thus having helped KROQ establish itself as an influential radio station of the 1980s and 1990s.

== Early life ==
Edwin Jed Fish Gould III was born on July 15, 1955, in Los Angeles, and grew up in the beach cities of Orange County, California, and later Casa Grande, Arizona.

== Career ==
Jed the Fish began his radio broadcasting career while a student at Casa Grande High School. He earned his First Class Radiotelephone Operator License in 1971 at age 16, programming and hosting a radio program targeted at the "youth market" on KPIN-AM.

From 1994 to July 2013, Jed hosted the nationally syndicated show Out of Order. Out of Order was two hours long and was syndicated by Dial Global.

From 2012 to 2018 Jed the Fish was also an air personality at radio station KCSN, where he programmed his own show.

In 2018, he became a DJ at Los Angeles' KLOS.

In February 2019, Jed the Fish joined the Roq of the 80s lineup on KROQ HD2 station on radio.com (now audacy.com) on Sundays from 6pm to midnight PST.

In addition to his on-air work, Jed the Fish produced the Southern California punk band El Centro's debut album in 1995 and the remix track “Thing” on Meg Lee Chin’s Junkies and Snakes in 2000.

== Personal life and death ==
In 1994, Jed the Fish purchased a 1894 Queen Anne Victorian estate home in Pasadena, California. The estate was featured in Lucille Ball's 1968 film Yours, Mine and Ours.

Jed the Fish graduated from USC's Annenberg School of Journalism with a bachelor of arts degree in broadcast journalism in 1978. He was also a drummer, sitting in on drums for John Dolmayan during the KROQ Weenie Roast performance of System of a Down in 2002.

In 1989, he was off the air for two months while he sought treatment for drug addiction.

Jed the Fish was diagnosed with small-cell lung cancer in March 2025, though he had never smoked. He died from the disease at his home in Pasadena, on April 14, 2025, at the age of 69.

== Awards ==
In 1997 and 1999, Jed was awarded the Billboard Modern Rock Personality of the Year award.

In 1998, Jed received an award for the Radio & Records Local Modern Rock Personality of the Year.

Jed the Fish was awarded Billboard's Major Market Alternative Radio Personality of the year in 1998 and 2000 (in 1999 his co-workers Kevin and Bean received the same award). He won Album Network's Alternative All Stars award for Virtuallyalternative Radio Personality in 1999 and 2000.

== Other media ==
- Jed the Fish is shown on the cover of Reel Big Fish's album, Turn The Radio Off
- Jed the Fish appears as himself in the game show "Win, Lose, or Draw: KRTH vs KROQ" in 1988
- Jed the Fish appears as a Radio Announcer in the film Night Angel in 1990
- Jed the Fish appears as himself in 1984 in Surf II
- Jed the Fish appears as himself in the 2003 documentary Mayor of the Sunset Strip, about Rodney Bingenheimer.
