= Open Your Eyes (Goldfinger album) =

Studio album by Goldfinger
- Released: May 21, 2002
- Recorded: 2001–2002
- Genres: Popcore; pop-punk
- Length: 38:10
- Label: Mojo/Jive
- Producers: John Feldmann; Kelly LeMieux

Goldfinger chronology
Stomping Ground (2000)	Open Your Eyes (2002)	Disconnection Notice (2005)

Singles from Album
- 1. "Tell Me" Released: 2002; 2. "Open Your Eyes" Released: 2002; 3. "Spokesman" Released: 2002

Open Your Eyes is the fourth album by American punk rock band Goldfinger, released on May 21, 2002. It was the first album to feature former Ünloco guitarist Brian Arthur after Charlie Paulson's departure from the band.

== Release ==
On March 7, 2002, Open Your Eyes was announced for release in two months' time. The title song "Open Your Eyes" was released to radio in late March. In April and May 2002, the band toured the US and Canada with Sum 41. The album was released on May 21, 2002, through Jive and Mojo Records. In May and June, the band toured across the US, which was followed by three shows in Canada in July. In August, the band appeared at a few of the North-eastern Warped Tour shows. On August 13 and September 23, the band performed on the Last Call with Carson Daly. In October, the band toured across Australia. In April 2003, the band headlined the Skate and Surf Fest.

== Reception ==
Professional ratings
Review scores
Source	Rating
AllMusic	4/5 stars
The Boston Phoenix	2.5/5 stars
Ox-Fanzine	6/10
Punknews.org	3.5/5 stars
Rock Hard	9/10
Rolling Stone	2/5 stars
RTÉ.ie	6/10

Open Your Eyes was met with generally favourable reviews from music critics.

== Track listing ==
All songs are written by John Feldmann, except where noted.

No.	Title	Length
1.	"Going Home"	1:36
2.	"Spokesman" (Featuring Bert McCracken)	2:33
3.	"Open Your Eyes" (Feldmann, Kelly LeMieux) (Featuring Bert McCracken)	2:47
4.	"Decision"	2:51
5.	"Dad"	3:00
6.	"Tell Me" (Feldmann, Amy Feldmann)	2:14
7.	"Liar"	0:20
8.	"January" (Feldmann, Benji Madden) (Featuring Benji Madden)	3:42
9.	"Happy"	2:42
10.	"Woodchuck" (Featuring Bert McCracken)	0:51
11.	"It's Your Life"	2:24
12.	"Spank Bank"	1:20
13.	"Youth"	2:29
14.	"Radio" (Feldmann, LeMieux)	3:24
15.	"FTN" (Fuck Ted Nugent)	2:01
16.	"Prank Calls" (Hidden track)	2:14
17.	"Wayne Gretzky" (Hidden track)	1:42

Bonus tracks
No.	Title	Length
18.	"The Upper Hand"	2:04
19.	"Spokesman" (Germish version)	6:58
20.	"Sue"

== Personnel ==
=== Goldfinger ===
- John Feldmann – rhythm guitar, lead vocals
- Brian Arthur – lead guitar, backing vocals, additional vocals on "Open Your Eyes"
- Kelly LeMieux – bass, backing vocals, additional guitar on "Open Your Eyes" and "Radio"
- Darrin Pfeiffer – drums, backing vocals, vocals and acoustic guitar on "Wayne Gretzky"

=== Additional performers ===
- Bert McCracken – vocals (2, 3, 10)
- Benji Madden – vocals on "January"
- Charlie Paulson – guitar (1, 4, 5, 15)
- Showoff – vocals on "FTN"

=== Technical personnel ===
- John Feldmann – producer, engineering, mixing
- Slamm Andrews, TJ Lindgren, Donny Campion, Mark Blewett – additional engineering
- Tim Palmer – mixing on "FTN"
- Joe Gastwirt – mastering at Ocean View Digital, Los Angeles

== Charts ==
=== Album ===
Chart (2002)	Peak position
Canadian Alternative Albums (Nielsen Soundscan)	29
UK Albums (OCC)	162
UK Independent Albums (Official Charts)	22
US Billboard 200	136

Year-end charts

Chart (2002)	Position
Canadian Alternative Albums (Nielsen SoundScan)	142

=== Singles ===
Year	Song	US Alt.	UK	UK Ind.
2002	"Open Your Eyes"	37	75	13
2002	"Spokesman" / "Tell Me"	—	81	13
