= Meson Ray =

Studio album by the Ernies
- Released: April 20, 1999
- Genre: Alternative metal; rap metal; alternative rock; jazz fusion; nu metal
- Length: 41:08
- Label: Mojo/Jive
- Producer: Howard Benson

Professional ratings
Review scores
Source	Rating
AllMusic	2.5/5 stars

Meson Ray is the third and final studio album by the alternative rock band the Ernies, released in 1999. Meson Ray was the first record by the Ernies to be released under Mojo Records. The album includes the band's biggest single, "Here and Now," which was featured in the popular 1999 video game Tony Hawk's Pro Skater, as well as in the 2004 documentary The Rise & Fall Of ECW and the trailer for Cowboy Bebop: The Movie.

== Critical reception ==
The Washington Post wrote that "even if the band's instrumental arsenal were suddenly muted by a power failure, its lyrics would suggest an almost relentlessly manic pulse tempered by a disarming sense of irony and humor." CMJ New Music Report wrote: "Partying like it's 1989, the Ernies are to skate culture what the Black Crowes are to classic rock 'n' roll--a soothing throwback to a period of time close to the heart of funk rock historians."

== Track listing ==
All songs written by Will Hummel, except where noted.

1. "Polarized" - 3:49
2. "Here and Now" - 3:30
3. "Fire" (Hummel, Mike Hughes) - 3:16
4. "Winter Stars (You and I)" - 4:02
5. "Organism" - 5:23
6. "The Hitman Tommy Stearns" - 4:50
7. "It's Digestible" - 3:26
8. "Where Do You Hide?" - 3:35
9. "Bacteria" - 3:19
10. "You Are Everywhere" - 2:25
11. "Mr. Benson and the Meson Ray (SOD-1)" (Hughes, Hayes Smith) - 3:33

== Band members ==
- Mike Hughes - bass, vocals
- Matt Goves - drums
- Hayes Smith - saxophone, vocals
- Chris Bondi - turntables, theremin
- Will Hummel - vocals, guitar, keyboards
