= The Knife (Goldfinger album) =

Studio album by Goldfinger
- Released: July 21, 2017
- Studio: Foxy, Marina del Rey, California
- Genre: Pop punk; ska punk
- Length: 39:04
- Label: Rise
- Producer: John Feldmann; Zakk Cervini; Matt Pauling

Goldfinger chronology
Hello Destiny... (2008)	The Knife (2017)	Never Look Back (2020)

Singles from The Knife
- 1. "Am I Deaf" Released: May 24, 2013; 2. "Put the Knife Away" Released: May 24, 2017; 3. "Tijuana Sunrise" Released: July 14, 2017

Professional ratings
Aggregate scores
Source	Rating
Metacritic	82/100
Review scores
Source	Rating
AllMusic	4/5 stars
PunkNews.org	3.5/5 stars
Irish Times	2/5 stars
Rock Hard	8/10
Rocksound	7/10

The Knife is the seventh studio album by American ska punk band Goldfinger, released on July 21, 2017, through Rise Records. It marks the band's first album following a nine-year non-album gap, their longest ever. It is their first release featuring their new supergroup line-up consisting of guitarist/vocalist and founding member John Feldmann, lead guitarist Philip Sneed (Story of the Year), bassist Mike Herrera (MxPx, Mike Herrera's Tumbledown) and drummer Travis Barker (Blink-182). There are also several notable musicians who make guest appearances on the album. The album received critical acclaim.

== Background ==
In the November/December 2010 issue No. 43 of SMASH magazine, Feldmann stated that a new EP or a possible full-length album was "in the works" with Feldmann having penned 4/5 new tracks, and Pfeiffer having recorded the drum tracks. Feldmann also states in the article that with the release of any new material would be supported with an extended tour. According to Feldmann, Goldfinger was expecting to have their new album out sometime in 2012. The band released a new song, "Am I Deaf", on Friday May 24, 2013. Four years later, Put the Knife Away was released.

In 2015, Feldmann did an interview with Fuse, noting that the band's future largely amounts to the occasional tour: "We'll probably release a song or two but I don't know if we're going to release albums anymore. We play the same songs we've always done."

== Track listing ==
Am I Deaf was originally recorded in 2013 with Charlie Paulson, Kelly LeMieux, and Darrin Pfeiffer but has since been re-recorded for the album featuring Sneed, Herrera and Barker.

All tracks are written by John Feldmann, except where noted.

No.	Title	Writer(s)	Length
1.	"A Million Miles"		2:05
2.	"Get What I Need"	Feldmann; Nate Albert	3:06
3.	"Am I Deaf"		3:04
4.	"Tijuana Sunrise"		3:38
5.	"Put the Knife Away"		2:58
6.	"Don't Let Me Go" (featuring Takahiro Moriuchi)		3:33
7.	"Beacon"		3:09
8.	"Who's Laughing Now"	Feldmann; Luke Hemmings	2:42
9.	"Say It Out Loud"		3:34
10.	"Orthodontist Girl" (featuring Josh Dun)		2:29
11.	"See You Around" (featuring Mark Hoppus)	Feldmann; Hoppus; Jonathan Fox; Martin Johnson	2:59
12.	"Liftoff" (featuring Nick Hexum)	Feldmann; Hexum; Fox; Rome Ramirez	3:27
13.	"Milla"		2:38
Total length:			39:04

== Personnel ==
Credits adapted from AllMusic and The Prelude Press.

Goldfinger

- John Feldmann – lead vocals, rhythm guitar, producer
- Philip Sneed – lead guitar, backing vocals
- Mike Herrera – bass guitar, backing vocals
- Travis Barker – drums

Additional musicians

- Zakk Cervini – bass guitar, guitar, keyboards
- Matt Pauling – bass guitar, guitar, keyboards
- Billy Kottage – keyboards, trombone
- Matt Appleton – saxophone
- John Christianson – trumpet

Guest artists

- Mark Hoppus (Blink-182) – co-lead vocals on "See You Around"
- Nick Hexum (311) – co-lead vocals on "Liftoff"
- Takahiro Moriuchi (One Ok Rock) – co-lead vocals on "Don't Let Me Go"
- Nate Albert (the Mighty Mighty Bosstones) – guitar on "Get What I Need"
- Makua Rothman – ukeke on "Liftoff"
- Josh Dun (Twenty One Pilots) – drums on "Orthodontist Girl"

Technical personnel

- Zakk Cervini – mixing, producer
- Matt Pauling – additional production, editing, engineer
- Brian Burnham – studio assistant
- Vinicius Gut – artwork, layout

== Charts ==
Chart (2017)	Peak position
UK Independent Albums (OCC)	33
UK Independent Album Breakers (OCC)	9
UK Rock & Metal Albums (OCC)	29
US Independent Albums (Billboard)	21
US Top Current Album Sales (Billboard)	96

== Release history ==
Region	Date	Format(s)	Label	Ref.
Worldwide	July 21, 2017	CD; DL; LP; stream	Rise	
