= MD.45 =

American rock band

- Genres: Heavy metal; punk rock
- Years active: 1996
- Labels: Slab, Capitol
- Spinoff of: Megadeth; Fear; Suicidal Tendencies
- Past members: Lee Ving; Dave Mustaine; Kelly LeMieux; Jimmy DeGrasso

MD.45 was an American heavy metal / punk rock band formed as a side project by Megadeth guitarist/vocalist Dave Mustaine and Fear vocalist Lee Ving. Bassist Kelly LeMieux (of Fear) and drummer Jimmy DeGrasso (of Y&T and on a break from Alice Cooper, who later joined Megadeth) rounded out the band's lineup.

== History ==
The band's name was derived from Mustaine's initials backwards (MD), combined with 45 which is derived from converting Ving's backwards initials (VL) to their numerical value in Roman numerals which is 45.

The band released only one album, 1996's The Craving. Many of the songs from the album were originally written for Megadeth, but due to the band almost breaking up, where Megadeth's guitarist Marty Friedman and drummer Nick Menza at the time focused on their solo projects, Mustaine decided to start a side project instead.

On June 24, 2023, Megadeth and Lee Ving performed the song "Nothing is Something" live at a concert in Tampa, Florida. This marks the only time an MD.45 song has been performed live.

=== Remixing controversy ===
In 2004, while remixing the Megadeth catalog, Mustaine was offered US$ 250,000 by his-then record label Capitol Records to re-release the album. Mustaine omitted all vocals and harmonica parts from Ving. Instead, Mustaine himself recorded the vocals, and played guitar where the harmonica should have been. In his 2011 autobiography, Mustaine said:

The change was an effort to entice interest from Megadeth fans who might have overlooked the original.

In 2020, Ving publicly spoke about his disapproval, saying in a podcast that he was never consulted about the changes, and Mustaine didn't contact him in any way. The remastered version was released by Capitol Records.

== Lineup ==
- Lee Ving – vocals, harmonica (original issue)
- Dave Mustaine – guitar (on both issues), vocals (on remastered issue)
- Kelly LeMieux – bass
- Jimmy DeGrasso – drums

Other

- Michael Kaye – guitar/backline technician
- Billy Moss – studio engineer/vintage recorders

== Discography ==
Date of release	Title	Label	Chart positions	US sales
July 23, 1996	The Craving	Slab Records		53,000
July 24, 2004	The Craving (remastered)	Capitol Records		
