= Hang-Ups (album) =

Studio album by Goldfinger
- Released: September 9, 1997
- Recorded: 1997
- Genres: Punk rock; ska punk; pop-punk; skate punk
- Length: 71:28
- Label: Mojo
- Producers: Jay Rifkin; John Feldmann

Goldfinger chronology
Goldfinger (1996)	Hang-Ups (1997)	Stomping Ground (2000)

Singles from Album
- 1. "This Lonely Place" Released: 1997; 2. "My Head" Released: 1997

Professional ratings
Review scores
Source	Rating
AllMusic	4/5 stars
Rock Hard	8.5/10
Wall of Sound	62/100

Hang-Ups is the second studio album by American punk rock band Goldfinger, released by Mojo Records on September 9, 1997. Many of the album's tracks feature more of a ska sound than their debut. The album's first single "This Lonely Place" was not as successful as "Here in Your Bedroom", a single off their debut album, but it did gain them numerous talk show appearances and spins of the video, which parodies the 1979 film Alien.

Like their self-titled debut, the horns on the album are provided by several members of the Orange County ska scene, most notably Dan Regan and Scott Klopfenstein of Reel Big Fish on trombone and trumpet, respectively. The song "Carlita" features Angelo Moore of Fishbone on saxophone and vocals.

"Superman" was used in the film Kingpin. Two years after its release, the song gained further recognition thanks to the Tony Hawk's video game franchise when it first appeared in the first installment of the series, Tony Hawk's Pro Skater in addition to its 2012 and 2020 remakes. The song has become so strongly associated with the video game that it forms a core part of the recognisability of the series, with the 2020 documentary about the games, Pretending I'm a Superman: The Tony Hawk Video Game Story, being named from the song.

== Track listing ==
All tracks are written by John Feldmann, with additional writers noted.

No.	Title	Writer(s)	Length
1.	"Superman"		3:05
2.	"My Head"	Charlie Paulson; Simon Williams	3:03
3.	"If Only"		2:25
4.	"This Lonely Place"		3:19
5.	"20¢ Goodbye"		1:58
6.	"Question"		2:57
7.	"Disorder"	Paulson	3:13
8.	"Carlita"	Paulson	3:16
9.	"Too Late"		2:20
10.	"I Need to Know"		2:53
11.	"Authority"		2:41
12.	"S.M.P. (Skiers Must Perish)"		1:01
13.	"The Last Time"		2:46
14.	"Chris Cayton"		3:08
15.	"It Isn't Just Me" (hidden track)		3:04
16.	"Chicken McNuggets" (hidden track)		0:58
17.	"Untitled" (hidden track)		0:31
Total length:			71:28

=== Notes ===
- "Chris Cayton" ends at 3:08. After 2 minutes of silence, at 5:08 begins the hidden track "It Isn't Just Me" which ends at 8:12. This is followed right after by another hidden track "Chicken McNuggets", that ends at minute 9:10. After 26 minutes and 50 seconds of silence, at 36:00 begins the "untitled" hidden track.

== Personnel ==
Goldfinger

- John Feldmann – vocals, guitar
- Charlie Paulson – guitar, vocals
- Darrin Pfeiffer – drums, vocals
- Simon Williams – bass, vocals

Additional musicians

- Paul Hampton – keyboards
- Chris Johnson – keyboards ("It Isn't Just Me")
- Angelo Moore, Kip Wirtzfeld, Jonas Cabrera, Gabrial McNair, Scott Klopfenstein, Dan Regan, Garth Schultz, Mike Menchaca – horns
- Angelo Moore, Chris Thompson, Aaron Barrett – backing vocals

Production

- Jay Rifkin and John Feldmann – production
- Chris Johnson, Kevin Globerman, and Slamm Andrews – engineering
- Josh Achziger and Bruno Roussel – additional engineering
- Dave Jerden – mixing
- Annette Cisneros, Bryan Carlstrom, Elan Trujillo, and Bryan Hall – assisting
- Eddie Schryer – mastering

== Charts ==
=== Album ===
Chart (1997)	Peak position
US Billboard 200	85

=== Singles ===
Year	Song	US Alt.
1997	"This Lonely Place"	14
