= Mike Herrera's Tumbledown =

American alternative country band

- Origin: Bremerton, Washington, United States
- Genres: Alternative country, cowpunk
- Years active: 2007–present
- Labels: End Sounds, Cafeina Riot Radio
- Members: Mike Herrera; Jack Parker; Marshall Trotland; Harley Trotland
- Website: tumbledownhq.com

Mike Herrera's Tumbledown is an alternative country band from Bremerton, Washington consisting of MxPx guitarist/vocalist Mike Herrera and Rocky Point All Stars (Jack Parker, Marshall Trotland, and Harley Trotland). The name "Tumbledown" comes from a line of a Woody Guthrie song. They are currently signed to End Sounds, which is based in Austin, Texas. In Mexico, they are signed to Cafeina Riot Radio Records.

== History ==
Herrera had first explored country music while in MxPx in 2005, with the track "Late Again" from the Panic album, which featured Parker on guitar. According to Herrera: "After that, I knew what I wanted to do with Tumbledown." In November 2007, Herrera formally announced the Tumbledown project. In January 2008, a music video was released for "Atlantic City", followed by one for "Ballad of a Factory Man" two months later.

The group released a self-titled debut album on May 19, 2009. The Aquarian Weekly gave it an 'A' rating, with reviewer Alexa Gilmartin calling it "a solid, enjoyable record...a taste of country for the non-believers". In August and September 2009, they went on a co-headlining US tour with Straylight Run frontman John Nolan. On September 2, 2009, a music video was released for "Butcher of San Antone", directed by Joe the Visualist.

In 2010 the band release the Live in Tulsa album, recorded the previous year.

In October 2010, the band's second studio album, Empty Bottle, was released on End Sounds.

The group performed on the Vans Warped Tour in 2014.

== Influences and sound ==
Herrera has pointed out that he has been writing country songs since 1998, and that this project has been long-awaited. He has cited Whiskeytown, Hank Williams, Johnny Cash, and Bill Monroe among influences. He explained his move into country music: "I've always liked country. I think the first song I ever learned to sing was Willie Nelson's "On The Road Again." When I write punk songs, I do it on an acoustic guitar, so it was just a natural progression to write more folk type songs." The band's music has been described as "a twangy mashup of country, folk, and punk sounds featuring acoustic guitar and upright bass". The band has often covered MxPx songs at their shows.

== Discography ==
Extended plays

- 2007: 3 Songs
- 2008: Atlantic City EP
- 2008: Atlantic City 7-inch
- 2009: Tumbledown/Yesterday's Ring split 7-inch
- 2010: Arrested in El Paso Blues Picture Disc 7-inch

Full-length albums

- 2009: Tumbledown
- 2010: Live in Tulsa
- 2010: Empty Bottle

Singles

- 2007: "Ballad of a Factory Man"
- 2008: "Atlantic City"
- 2009: "The Butcher of San Antone"
- 2019: "Run Rudolph Run"
