= Goldfinger (album) =

Studio album by Goldfinger
- Released: February 27, 1996
- Recorded: 1995
- Genres: Punk rock; pop-punk; skate punk; ska punk
- Length: 37:15
- Label: Mojo
- Producer: Jay Rifkin

Goldfinger chronology
Goldfinger (1996)	Hang-Ups (1997)

Singles from Goldfinger
- 1. "Here in Your Bedroom" Released: 1996; 2. "Mable" Released: 1996; 3. "Pictures" Released: 1996

Professional ratings
Review scores
Source	Rating
AllMusic	4/5 stars

Goldfinger is the debut studio album by American punk rock band Goldfinger, released on Mojo Records in February 1996 and produced by Mojo founder Jay Rifkin. The album was a hit on college radio. The single "Here in Your Bedroom" was a top 5 rock hit in the U.S. in the summer of 1996, and also reached No. 47 on the Billboard Hot 100 Airplay chart, making it their highest charting single ever. The album was certified gold in Canada (50,000 copies) in 2002. It is the only album by the band not to be produced by frontman John Feldmann in any capacity.

Horns on the album were provided by members of other Southern California ska and ska punk bands, including trombonist Dan Regan and trumpeter Scott Klopfenstein of Reel Big Fish and saxophonist Efren Santana of Hepcat. Paul Hampton of the Skeletones provided keyboards on the album and is featured in the video for "Here in Your Bedroom". The cover for the album was drawn by Alan Forbes. It depicts a "big sex god alien chasing this little man, '50s style".

Although Goldfinger is a well-known album among the ska punk community, Feldmann does not consider it a work of that genre.

== Music and song information ==
Goldfinger was recorded in Hans Zimmer studio by the time he was recording The Lion King II: Simba's Pride. For the album's 20th anniversary, Feldmann commented on its music:

There's definitely an energy to that record. It sounds different to the contemporary albums. I listen to (Rancid's) ...And Out Come the Wolves and (Green Day's) Dookie and those record [sic] have proper producers. Rob Cavallo was a proper producer. (Blink-182 collaborator) Jerry Finn was a proper producer. I listen to our records that I produced and there's this unconfined energy that's very cool. The way we made that record was so backwards and unprofessional and it worked. I sang in an unauthentic voice. I came into my own as a singer by album three. The first record I was channeling somewhere between (the Clash's) Joe Strummer, (Rancid's) Tim Armstrong, some Exploited, some forced English accent but there's something very innocent about it. At the time I was selling shoes. I was this desperate kid trying hard not to have a life in retail.

The opening track "Mind's Eye" was the first song Feldmann wrote for Goldfinger. Commenting on the feedback heard in the very first seconds of the song, he said: "We recorded that album on tape. It was all super experimental—'Well what if we have the feedback going, we hit record and start playing so the tape starts with nothing.'". "Anything" was written by a 17-year-old Feldmann.

== Track listing ==
All songs written by John Feldmann, except where noted.

No.	Title	Length
1.	"Mind's Eye"	2:10
2.	"Stay"	2:21
3.	"Here in Your Bedroom"	3:10
4.	"Only a Day"	2:15
5.	"King for a Day"	3:43
6.	"Anxiety"	2:21
7.	"Answers" (Feldmann, Charlie Paulson)	2:40
8.	"Anything"	2:45
9.	"Mable" (Feldmann, Paulson, Simon Williams)	2:19
10.	"The City with Two Faces"	1:46
11.	"My Girlfriend's Shower Sucks"	1:07
12.	"Miles Away"	1:54
13.	"Nothing to Prove" (Feldmann, Paulson)	2:31
14.	"Pictures"	2:17
15.	"Phonecall" (Unlisted)	2:34
16.	"Fuck You and Your Cat" (Unlisted)	1:15
Total length:		37:15

== Personnel ==
=== Goldfinger ===
- John Feldmann – vocals, guitar
- Charlie Paulson – guitar, vocals
- Dangerous Darrin Pfeiffer – drums, vocals
- Simon Williams – bass, vocals

=== Technical personnel ===
- John Feldmann – producer
- Jay Rifkin – producer, engineer
- Slamm Andrews – engineer
- Geoff Zanelli – assistant engineer
- Stephen Marcussen – mastering at Precision
- Alan Forbes – artwork
- Otto-Nice Man – layout
- Simon Williams – cover concept

== Charts ==
Chart (1996)	Peak position
US Billboard 200	110
US Heatseekers Albums (Billboard)	1
