= Mojo Records =

American record company

- Parent company: Jive
- Founded: 1995
- Founder: Jay Rifkin
- Defunct: 2006
- Status: Inactive
- Distributors: BMG (2001–2004); Universal (1996–2001)
- Genre: Ska punk; alternative rock; nu metal
- Country of origin: U.S.
- Location: Santa Monica, California

Mojo Records was a California-based record label founded in 1995 by producer Jay Rifkin. It became a joint venture with Universal Records in 1996 and then sold to the Zomba Group in 2001, who placed it under their subsidiary Jive Records. The label has been largely inactive since Zomba was purchased and restructured under BMG in 2003, save for a few reissues of older material.

== Artists and albums ==
- Admiral Twin (alternative rock)
  - Mock Heroic (2000)
- Cherry Poppin' Daddies (rock/ska/swing)
  - Zoot Suit Riot (1997)
  - Soul Caddy (2000)
- The Ernies (alternative rock/ska punk)
  - Meson Ray (1999)
- Factory 81 (nu metal)
  - Mankind (1999)
- Goldfinger (ska punk/pop punk)
  - Goldfinger (1996)
  - Hang-Ups (1997)
  - Stomping Ground (2000)
  - Foot in Mouth (2001)
  - Open Your Eyes (2002)
  - The Best of Goldfinger (2005)
- Pilfers (ska/rock)
  - Chawalaleng (1999)
- Plastiscene (Britpop/Rock)
  - Plastiscene EP (1997)
  - Seeing Stars (1998)
- Reel Big Fish (ska punk)
  - Turn the Radio Off (1996)
  - Why Do They Rock So Hard? (1998)
  - Favorite Noise (2002)
  - Cheer Up! (2002)
  - We're Not Happy 'Til You're Not Happy (2005)
  - Greatest Hit...And More (2006)
- Slayer (thrash metal)
  - Hell Awaits (2008 Malaysia re-release)
- Weston (pop punk)
  - The Massed Albert Sounds (2000)
- White Hot Odyssey (glam rock)
  - White Hot Odyssey (2004)

== See also ==
- List of record labels
