= Darrin Pfeiffer =

American drummer

- Also known as: Dangerous Darrin
- Born: Darrin Michael Pfeiffer; June 7, 1969 (age 57); Akron, New York, United States
- Genres: Pop punk, ska punk, thrash metal (early)
- Occupations: Songwriter, musician
- Instruments: Drums, vocals, guitar
- Years active: 1994–present
- Labels: Mojo, Jive, Warner Bros., Maverick, SideOneDummy

Darrin Michael Pfeiffer (born June 7, 1969) is an American musician, record producer, band manager and radio personality. He has played drums in the pop punk band Goldfinger and Canadian band The Salads. Darrin has also filled in on drums with Sum 41 and The Dickies.

== Biography ==
Pfeiffer was born in Akron, New York, a suburb of Buffalo New York. He began his music career in the mid 1980s, as part of a thrash metal band called Beyond Death with Alex Webster now in Cannibal Corpse and Jack Owen now in Six Feet Under. The band's two other members went on to found the death metal band Cannibal Corpse in 1988.

Pfeiffer moved to Los Angeles in 1991 and bounced around various bands. In 1994, Pfeiffer, John Feldmann and Simon Williams met and formed Goldfinger. The band released their self titled debut record on February 27, 1996, to immediate commercial success. Subsequent records followed and those also sold well. Pfeiffer and Goldfinger have toured the world and sold over 2 million records worldwide. In May 2016, it was announced Goldfinger and Pfeiffer had parted ways due to interpersonal conflicts between lead singer John Feldmann and Pfeiffer, leaving Feldmann and Paulson as the only two original members of the group. Pfeiffer, Feldmann and Paulson have no ill will towards each other.

In 2002, Pfeiffer moved from Los Angeles to Toronto, Ontario where, after 5 years there, he became a Canadian citizen. There, he started managing and producing bands. In 2005, Pfeiffer became an on-air host for 102.1 The Edge and enjoyed almost years of on air success there. Late in 2005, Pfeiffer started their own record label, High 4 Recordings, distributed worldwide through Sony. Their first signing was a pop/rock band called Crush Luther whose self-titled CD was released on February 13, 2007. The next band he signed was Cauterize. They released the CD, Disguises, on June 12, 2007. During this time is when he joined the Canadian band The Salads.

Pfeiffer was asked to fill in for his Canadian punks Sum 41 in 2015 for some international shows. Pfeiffer has also filled in over the course of several years with Los Angeles punk legends The Dickies.

Pfeiffer has released two solo albums under his alias "Dangerous Darrin". One is The Revenge...of Chicken McNuggets and the other, The Artist...Currently Known as Dangerous Darrin. These albums are no longer for sale.

In 2013, Pfeiffer moved back to Los Angeles where he works for the Los Angeles offices of Create Music Group in the finance department and also started a record label there called Chart Attack Records that launched in early 2016. Darrin also has a new radio show on the Idobi Radio Network called The Dangerous Darrin Show with his Buffalo, New York friend TS. They feature guests from the world of sports, music, pop culture and politics. TS left the show in July 2021 due to creative differences.
