= Kelly LeMieux =

American bassist (born 1967)

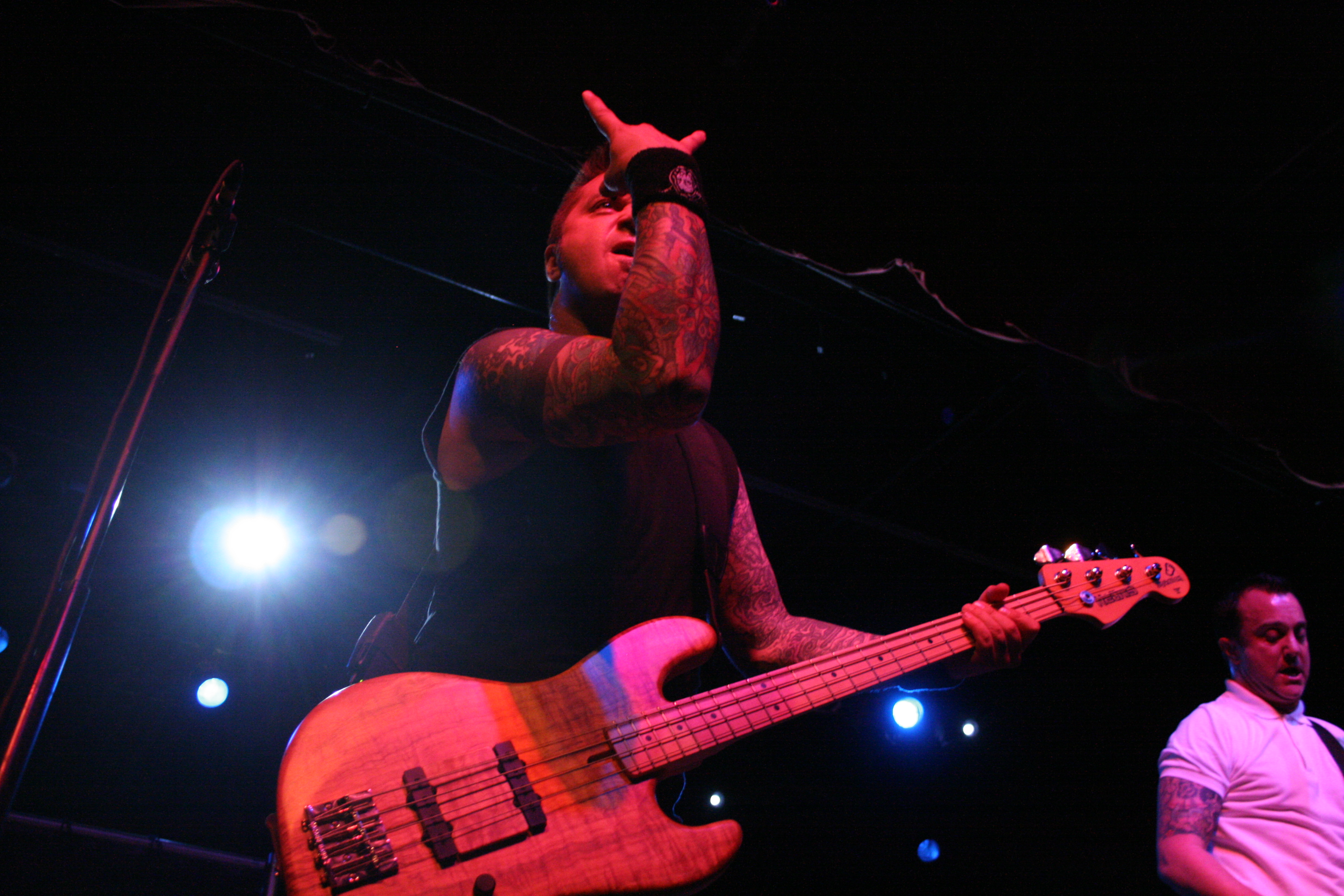
- LeMieux performing in 2008

Background information
- Born: Kelly Thomas LeMieux; April 7, 1967 (age 58); Faribault, Minnesota, U.S.
- Genres: Pop-punk; ska punk; hard rock
- Occupation: Bassist
- Instrument: bass guitar
- Years active: 1990–present
- Member of: Buckcherry
- Formerly of: Goldfinger; Electric Love Hogs; MD.45; stOrk

Kelly Thomas LeMieux (born April 7, 1967) is an American bass player. He is known for being the former bassist of the band Goldfinger and his work in the Dave Mustaine project MD.45. He was the touring bass player for Los Angeles punk band Fear in 1997 and 1998. He has toured with Paul Gilbert and appeared on Gilbert's album Vibrato, was a founding member of the Electric Love Hogs, a member of Shrine and 22 Jacks.

LeMieux played in Goldfinger until 2014 and is a guest instructor for the Portland chapter of the School of Rock. He was also an instructor for Paul Gilbert's Great Guitar Escape.

He has also recorded with Steeve Estatof, the 2004 French Idol winner.

In October 2013, he was announced as replacement for Buckcherry's former bassist Jimmy Ashhurst, for the rest of the band's 2013 touring schedule. In 2013, he also joined stOrk, a progressive metal band led by Thomas Lang.

On July 9, 2016, via his Facebook account, LeMieux revealed that he had been diagnosed with Acute Myeloid Leukemia (AML), a type of cancer of the blood and bone marrow with excess immature white blood cells.
