= John Feldmann =

American musician and record producer (born 1967)

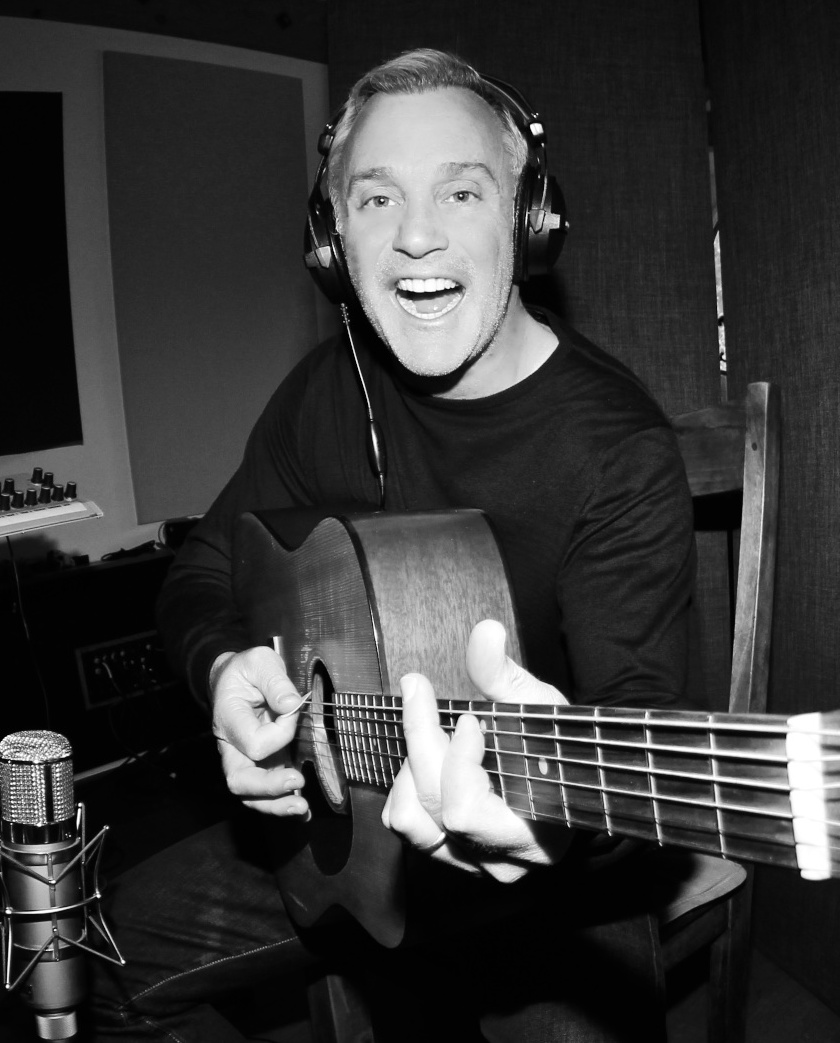
- Feldmann with his Martin acoustic at Foxy Studios in 2015

Background information
- Also known as: Feldy
- Born: John William Feldmann; 1967 (age 58–59)
- Genres: Punk rock; alternative rock; pop-punk; ska punk; skate punk
- Occupations: Singer; musician; record producer; songwriter
- Instruments: Vocals; guitar; keyboards
- Years active: 1980–present
- Member of: Goldfinger
- Formerly of: Electric Love Hogs
- Website: johnfeldmann.com

John William Feldmann (born 1967) is an American musician, singer-songwriter and record producer. He serves as the lead singer/guitarist of the punk rock band Goldfinger. Feldmann has written and produced for many acts including Good Charlotte, All Time Low, Avril Lavigne, Skrillex, Avicii, 5 Seconds Of Summer, The Used, Panic! At The Disco, blink-182, FEVER 333, Beartooth, Biffy Clyro, Korn and 311.

== Early life ==
Feldmann grew up in Saratoga, California. As a child, his father only allowed him to listen to musicals. He struggled during middle school. He started writing songs around the ages of 13-14. The first album he owned was the Star Wars soundtrack, which he credits to influencing his melodies. Around that time, he met the band Social Distortion, and was inspired to be like them.

== Career ==
Feldmann's first band was Saratoga-based Family Crisis. In 1988, he moved to Los Angeles, where he formed the band Electric Love Hogs and met future Goldfinger bassist Kelly LeMieux. The Electric Love Hogs (which also included Dave Kushner of Velvet Revolver and Bobby Hewitt of Orgy) put out one album, their self-titled 1992 debut, which was co-produced by Tommy Lee.

Feldmann formed Goldfinger in Los Angeles in 1994 after meeting original Goldfinger bassist Simon Williams in a shoe store where they were both working. Goldfinger played 385 shows in 1996, breaking the Guinness Book of World Records for the most concerts in one year for a touring band. In 1999, Goldfinger's song "Superman" was featured in the Tony Hawk's Pro Skater video game. Starting with their self-titled debut album in 1996, Goldfinger has released nine studio albums, including Never Look Back, which was released on Big Noise on December 4, 2020, and Nine Lives, which was released on January 23, 2026.

In 1998, Feldmann began producing for other bands, starting with Showoff, producing their self-titled debut album, followed by Mest and The Used. He produced Story of the Year's 2003 debut album Page Avenue, which was certified Gold by the RIAA and peaked at number 51 on the Billboard 200, and included the hits "Anthem of Our Dying Day" and "Until the Day I Die". He produced and co-wrote Blink-182's 2016 album California, which reached number 1 on the Billboard 200 and was nominated for a Grammy Award for Best Rock Album. He co-wrote and co-produced "Made An America" by The Fever 333, which was nominated for a Grammy Award for Best Rock Performance. He has also co-written and produced for All Time Low, 5 Seconds of Summer, Good Charlotte, Panic! at the Disco, Beartooth, Biffy Clyro, Korn, 311, Black Veil Brides, Avril Lavigne, Ashlee Simpson, Ashley Tisdale, Hilary Duff, Mandy Moore, and Papa Roach. The albums Feldmann has worked on have grossed more than 34 million sales worldwide.

Starting in 1997, Feldmann has worked as an A&R executive at Warner Bros. Records, scouting talent and overseeing artist development. Feldmann is a former A&R consultant for Red Bull Records. In 2016, he became the Vice President of A&R at BMG. He currently works with artists to produce albums released under the record label Big Noise, which he founded alongside Nick Gross and Jon Cohen in 2017.

Feldmann, Travis Barker, and John Reese started Back to the Beach Festival at Huntington State Beach in 2018. The two-day ska and punk festival featured The Mighty Mighty Bosstones, 311, and Sublime With Rome its first year, and was headlined by Blink-182 in 2019, but has not returned after that.

Feldmann is published by Big Noise and managed by Lucas Keller and Nic Warner at Milk & Honey.

== Personal life ==
Feldmann is a vegan and is a vocal activist for animal rights.

== Awards ==
Year	Award	Category	Work	Result
2017	Alternative Press Music Award	Influencer	N/A	Won
2017	Grammy Award	Best Rock Album	California by Blink-182	Nominated
2018	Grammy Award	Best Rock Performance	Made an America by The Fever 333	Nominated
2022	Juno Award	Album of the Year	Love Sux by Avril Lavigne	Nominated
2022	Juno Award	Single of the Year	Bite Me by Avril Lavigne	Nominated
2022	MTV VMA	Best Alternative	Love It When You Hate Me by Avril Lavigne	Nominated
2025	Grammy Award	Best Dance/Electronic Recording	Voltage by Skrillex	Nominated

== Selected production discography ==
Year	Artist	Album/song	Role	Notes
2025	VOILA	The Last Laugh (Part II) ("LIFEBLOOD" & "TIC TAC TOE")	Writer/Producer	
2025	Avril Lavigne	Young & Dumb (feat. Simple Plan)	Writer/producer	
2025	Lil Skies	2Much 2Fast (feat. Landon Cube)	Writer/producer	
2025	Lil Skies	Falling Backwards	Writer/producer	
2024	The Veronicas	Gothic Summer	Writer/producer	
2024	Iann Dior	BLIND	Writer/producer	
2024	Iann Dior	House On Fire	Writer/producer	
2023	Yungblud	Happier (feat. Oli Sykes of Bring Me the Horizon)	Writer	
2023	Jazmin Bean	"Piggie"	Producer/co-writer	
2023	The Used	Toxic Positivity	Writer/producer	
2023	Ruston Kelly	The Weakness	Producer/co-writer	
2023	Jasiah	3	Producer/co-writer	
2022	Avril Lavigne	"I'm a Mess" (featuring Yungblud)	Producer/co-writer	
2022	Iann Dior	"Live Fast Die Numb"	Producer/co-writer	
2022	5 Seconds of Summer	5SOS5	Producer/co-writer	
2022	Jasiah	"Earthquake" (featuring Jxdn)	Producer/co-writer	
2022	Avril Lavigne	"Bite Me"	Producer/co-writer	Certified Gold
2022	Avril Lavigne	Love Sux	Producer/co-writer	
2022	Sueco	"Loser"	Producer/co-writer	Certified Gold
2022	Sueco	It Was Fun While It Lasted	Producer/co-writer	Certified Gold
2021	5 Seconds of Summer	"2011"	Producer	
2021	Mod Sun	Internet Killed the Rockstar	Producer/co-writer	
2021	Two Feet	Never Enough	Producer/co-writer	
2021	Sueco	Paralyzed	Producer/co-writer	Certified Gold
2021	Bryce Vine	"Empty Bottles" (featuring Mod Sun)	Producer	
2020	Poorstacy	The Breakfast Club (Deluxe Edition)	Producer/co-writer	
2020	Jxdn	So What!	Co-writer	Gold
2020	Goldfinger	Never Look Back	Writer/producer/engineer/mixer	
2019	Fever 333	Strength in Numb333rs	Co-producer/co-writer	
2019	311	Voyager	Producer/co-writer	
2019	Blink-182	Nine	Producer/co-writer	
2019	Korn	The Nothing	"This Loss" co-writer	
2018	The Struts	One Night Only	Writer	
2018	The Fever 333	Made an America	Co-producer/co-writer	
2018	Godsmack	When Legends Rise	Co-writer	Certified Gold
2017	311	Mosaic	Producer/co-writer	
2017	Goldfinger	The Knife	Producer/writer	
2016	Biffy Clyro	Ellipsis	"Animal Style" co-producer/co-writer	
2016	Blink-182	California	Producer/co-writer	Certified Gold
2015	One Ok Rock	35XXXV	Producer/co-writer/mixer	
2015	All Time Low	Future Hearts	Producer/co-writer/mixer	
2015	5 Seconds of Summer	Sounds Good Feels Good	Producer/co-writer/mixer	Certified Platinum
2014	Beartooth	Disgusting	"In Between" writer/A&R	Certified Gold
2014	The Word Alive	Real	Producer	
2014	5 Seconds of Summer	5 Seconds of Summer	Producer/co-writer/mixer	Certified Gold
2014	Avicii	The Nights	Co-writer	Certified Platinum
2013	We Came as Romans	Tracing Back Roots	Producer/mixer	
2013	Black Veil Brides	Wretched and Divine: The Story of the Wild Ones	Producer/co-writer/mixer	Certified Gold
2013	Makua Rothman	Sound Wave	A&R/producer/co-writer/mixer	
2013	Heaven’s Basement	Filthy Empire	Producer/co-writer	
2012	The Used	Vulnerable	Producer/mixer/writer	
2012	Papa Roach	The Connection	Producer/co-writer/mixer	
2011	We Came as Romans	Understanding What We've Grown to Be	Producer/mixer (deluxe edition)	
2011	Panic! at the Disco	Vices & Virtues	Producer/engineer/mixer/writer	Certified Gold
2011	Destroy Rebuild Until God Shows	D.R.U.G.S.	Producer/engineer/mixer	
2010	Good Charlotte	Cardiology	Writer	Certified Gold
2008	Goldfinger	Hello Destiny...	Writer/producer/mixer	
2007	The Used	Lies for the Liars	Producer/engineer	Certified Gold
2007	Atreyu	Lead Sails Paper Anchor	Producer/engineer	Certified Gold
2007	The Veronicas	Hook Me Up	Writer/producer/mixer	Certified 2× Platinum
2005	Hilary Duff	Most Wanted	Writer/producer	Certified Platinum
2005	Goldfinger	Disconnection Notice	Writer/producer/engineer/mixer	
2004	Ashlee Simpson	Autobiography	Writer	Certified 3× Platinum
2004	Good Charlotte	The Chronicles of Life and Death	Writer	Certified Platinum
2004	The Used	In Love and Death	Producer/engineer/mixer	Certified Platinum
2003	Story of the Year	Page Avenue	A&R/writer/producer/mixer	Certified Platinum
2003	The Used	Maybe Memories	Writer/producer/mixer	Certified Platinum
2002	Goldfinger	Open Your Eyes	A&R/producer/engineer/mixer	
2002	Good Charlotte	The Young and the Hopeless	Writer	Certified 3× Platinum
2002	The Used	The Used	A&R/producer/engineer/mixer	Certified Platinum
2000	Goldfinger	Stomping Ground	Writer/producer	
1999	Goldfinger	Darrin's Coconut Ass: Live	Producer/engineer/mixer	
1997	Goldfinger	Hang-Ups	Writer/producer	
1996	Reel Big Fish	Turn the Radio Off	A&R	Certified Gold
1996	Goldfinger	Goldfinger	Writer/producer	Certified Gold

== See also ==
- Animal rights and punk subculture
