= Goldfinger (band) =

American punk band

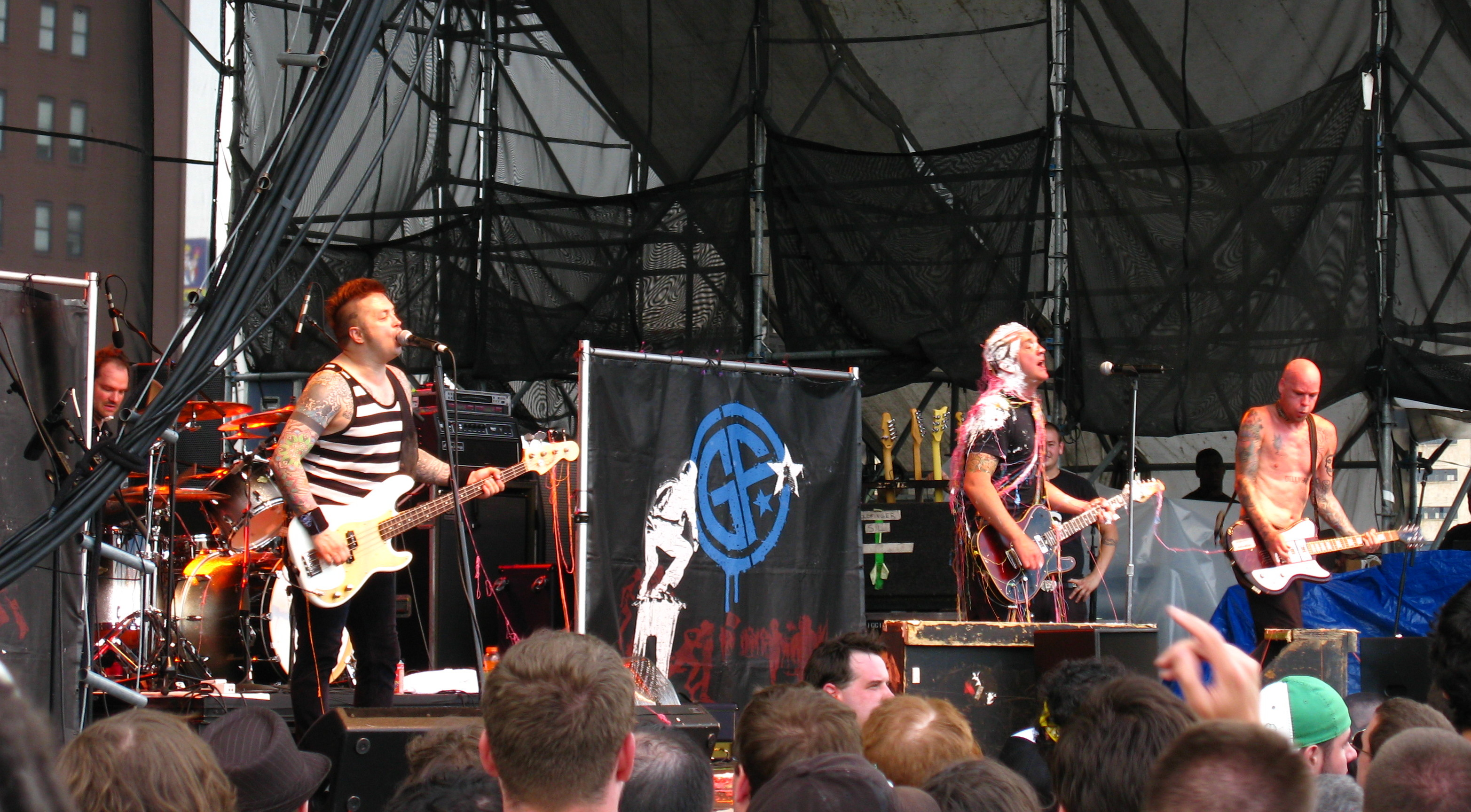
- Goldfinger live in Philadelphia in June 2008. From left to right: Darrin Pfeiffer, Kelly LeMieux, John Feldmann and Charlie Paulson.

Background information
- Origin: Los Angeles, California, U.S.
- Genres: Pop-punk; ska punk; punk rock
- Years active: 1994–present
- Labels: Universal; Mojo; Jive; Maverick; SideOneDummy; Rise; Big Noise
- Members: John Feldmann; Charlie Paulson; Mike Herrera; Philip "Moon Valjean" Sneed; Nick Gross
- Past members: Darrin Pfeiffer; Simon Williams; Steve Geiger; Kelly LeMieux; Brian Arthur
- Website: goldfingermusic.com

Goldfinger is an American punk rock band from Los Angeles, formed in 1994. In their early years, the band was considered a contributor to the movement of third-wave ska, a mid-late 1990s revitalization in the popularity of ska, evidenced in their first three albums: Goldfinger (1996), Hang-Ups (1997) and Stomping Ground (2000). However, the releases of Open Your Eyes (2002) and Disconnection Notice (2005) saw the band shed most of the ska influence, and they have been more commonly placed in the pop-punk genre in later years. They have since released four more albums: Hello Destiny... (2008), The Knife (2017), Never Look Back (2020), and Nine Lives (2026). The band is also noted for their support for animal rights.

Frontman John Feldmann has been the sole constant member of the group. Other longtime members have included Charlie Paulson (guitar), Simon Williams (bass), Kelly LeMieux (bass) and Darrin Pfeiffer (drums). As of 2019, the band consists of Feldmann, Paulson, Philip Sneed (guitar), Mike Herrera (bass), and Nick Gross (drums).

== History ==
=== Formation, Goldfinger, and Hang-Ups (1994–1998) ===
Goldfinger was formed by former Electric Love Hogs member John Feldmann on vocals and guitar, Simon Williams on bass, former drummer of Zero Tolerance Darrin Pfeiffer on drums, and Charlie Paulson on guitar. At the time the band was formed, Feldmann and Williams were working at the same shoe store where they were discovered by A&R Executive Patrick McDowell. Before they were signed to a major label, they released an EP titled Richter on the independent label Mojo Records, which received favorable reviews and a substantial amount of airplay on college radio, leading to Goldfinger and Mojo signing a major-label contract with Universal Records.

Many of the songs on Richter are demo versions of songs on the band's full-length debut, Goldfinger, which was produced by Jay Rifkin and released by Mojo Records on February 29, 1996. The song "Here in Your Bedroom" from the album was especially popular and helped the band gain a solid fanbase. In 2006, Alternative Press listed the self-titled Goldfinger album as one of the "10 Albums That Shaped 1996" alongside No Doubt, Weezer and others. The band released its second album, Hang-Ups, on September 9, 1997. Founding bassist Simon Williams left the band following Hang-Ups. During this time, Goldfinger released a popular cover of the song "More Today Than Yesterday" by Spiral Starecase, which also helped the band stay out of obscurity.

=== Darrin's Coconut Ass: Live from Omaha, Stomping Ground, and Open Your Eyes (1999–2003) ===
On November 9, 1999, Goldfinger released Darrin's Coconut Ass: Live from Omaha, a collection of 8 cover songs from the band. Goldfinger's third studio LP was Stomping Ground, which was released on March 28, 2000. The album sold poorly in the US but was a modest hit in some European countries, thanks to their cover of Nena's "99 Red Balloons" sung partly in German. In 2000, during their tour of England, Goldfinger recorded one of their sets, issuing the live Foot in Mouth, available only at shows and through the band's official website. In 2001, Goldfinger announced that Charlie Paulson was leaving the band and was being replaced by former Ünloco member, Brian Arthur. Their next album, Open Your Eyes (2002), was the first for their new record label, Jive/Zomba. On this album, the band abandoned much of its ska influences in favor of a more heavy sound. Furthermore, some of the lyrics discussed animal rights, a subject which had not been touched upon in earlier albums. The band recorded a music video for the title track of the album, which was also focused on animal rights.

=== Disconnection Notice and return of Charlie Paulson (2004–2006) ===
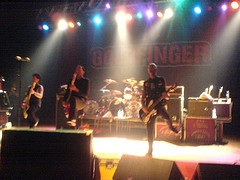
Goldfinger live in 2006

In early 2005, they released its first album for their new label, Maverick Records, titled Disconnection Notice, which was written, produced and recorded all throughout 2004. The song "Wasted" from the album was released as a single. The CD was less well received compared to former Goldfinger albums. In 2005, Brian departed from the band after the release of the album. Shortly after Brian's departure, Goldfinger announced that their original guitarist Charlie Paulson would return. Charlie returned to the stage playing three songs at the Key Club in LA when the band finished a Western USA tour.

=== Hello Destiny... (2007–2010) ===
Goldfinger signed to the independent record label SideOneDummy in 2007. On April 22, 2008, the band released their sixth full-length record called Hello Destiny.... To promote the album, the band embarked on a successful North American tour with Less Than Jake in summer of 2008. They also played in the UK at the Reading and Leeds Festivals on August 22–23, 2008.

Frontman John Feldmann has produced records for Mest, the Used (whose vocalist Bert McCracken sang some guest vocals on "Open Your Eyes", "Woodchuck", "Ocean Size", and "Handjobs for Jesus"), Hilary Duff and Story of the Year. He also produced Good Charlotte's single "The Anthem" (whose guitarist Benji Madden provides guest vocals on "January", which was originally named "Oracle of Elcaro"). He also signed the band Ünloco with Maverick Records.

In November 2010, Goldfinger played a handful of shows on a small, west coast tour with Reel Big Fish. These are the first shows performed without Darrin Pfeiffer on drums. Drumming duties were handled by Branden Steineckert of Rancid. Also, on the Los Angeles show at the House of Blues, original bassist, Simon Williams came out to perform several songs off their first album. This was the first time Williams had performed with the band in over a decade. He played the Las Vegas show as well.

=== The Knife (2010–2020) ===
In the November/December 2010 issue No. 43 of SMASH magazine, Feldmann stated that a new EP or a possible full-length album was "in the works" with Feldmann having penned 4/5 new tracks, and Pfeiffer having recorded the drum tracks. Feldmann also states in the article that with the release of any new material would be supported with an extended tour. According to Feldmann, Goldfinger was expecting to have their new album out sometime in 2012. The band released a new song, "Am I Deaf", on Friday May 24, 2013.

In 2015, Feldmann gave an interview with Fuse, noting that the band's future largely amounts to the occasional tour: "We'll probably release a song or two but I don't know if we're going to release albums anymore. We play the same songs we've always done."

On July 21, 2017, the group released The Knife, the band's first album featuring Mike Herrera (MxPx), Travis Barker (Blink-182), and Philip "Moon Valjean" Sneed (Story Of The Year, Greek Fire). Darrin, Kelly, and Charlie left the band prior to its release. Darrin Pfeiffer left the band due to personality conflicts with Feldmann. Darrin spoke about some of the conflicts with Feldmann on an episode of Mike Herrera's podcast. Kelly Lemieux currently tours with Buckcherry, along with other bands and has cited that for his reasoning behind not being an active participant with Goldfinger. Charlie Paulson did rejoin the band on stage for the 2019 Back to the Beach festival and Vans Warped Tour 25th Anniversary. Paulson has since rejoined the band as he has played with them in all their recent shows as well as joining them on their "Fueling The fire" tour with Less Than Jake in September 2019. The band's live lineup generally consists of Feldmann, Paulson, Herrerra and Sneed, with Barker occasionally playing live shows and other friends of Feldmann playing drums. Other musicians fill-in on guitar and bass when Paulson, Sneed, and Herrerra are not present at shows as well. Their live shows often feature horn players from numerous other ska bands, including Ruben Durazo, Matt Appleton, Billy Kottage, and numerous others.

During the 2020 Coronavirus Pandemic, Goldfinger began producing and releasing a series of live performances to YouTube, designated "Quarantine Videos". Individual members recorded their performances in their own homes, to be subsequently mixed and mastered by Feldman. The first performance was a rendition of "Here in Your Bedroom". To date, the band have released eight "Quarantine Videos" for songs including their cover of Nena's "99 Luftballons" and original song, "Superman". Notably, seven of the eight video performances featured musician and entrepreneur, Nick Gross, on drums.

=== Never Look Back (2020–2023) ===
December 4, 2020, marked the release of Never Look Back with members John Feldmann, Charlie Paulson, Mike Herrera, Philip Sneed, and Nick Gross. It is the first album since 2008's Hello Destiny to feature Paulson, the group's original guitarist.

On December 10, 2020, the band held an online-only release party in support of the album where they live streamed an entire set. Due to the Coronavirus pandemic, an in-person event was not feasible.

On July 29, 2022, the band announced the deluxe version of Never Look Back, which features three rerecorded tracks (that of Here in Your Bedroom with Avril Lavigne, Superman with Biffy Clyro, and 99 Red Balloons) and four new bonus tracks. It was released on August 5. The band started playing shows again in late 2022 and early 2023, with the Planet Smashers, Mustard Plug, and Catch 22.

=== Nine Lives (2024–present) ===
On July 19, 2024, the band, alongside Less Than Jake, released a cover of Morgan Wallen's "I Had Some Help".

On July 11, 2025, the band released a new track titled "Freaking Out A Bit", which was co-written alongside Blink-182 members Mark Hoppus and Travis Barker. Hoppus sings on the track. The single "Chasing Amy" was released on November 7. On January 7, 2026, the band announced their ninth studio album Nine Lives, which released on January 23. The album features collaborations with Jim Lindberg, Spencer Charnas, Zac Carper, Iann Dior, and El Hefe.

== Animal rights ==
Since the band began, Feldmann became a vegan and animal rights supporter, as can be seen briefly in the music video for "Open Your Eyes". They also donated the song "What Gives You The Right" to the Southern Animal Rights Coalition benefit CD, Until Every Cage Is Empty, as well as writing the song "Free Kevin Kjonaas" in relation to the activist associated with the SHAC 7. One of the songs, "FTN", harshly criticizes Ted Nugent and Jennifer Lopez for their hunting tactics and fur fashion, respectively. He also advocates and supports the Animal Liberation Front. For the song "Behind the Mask" from the album Disconnection Notice, Feldmann convinced PETA president and co-founder Ingrid Newkirk to allow him to sample one of her speeches on animal cruelty.

== In film and video games ==
Goldfinger songs have made several appearances in motion pictures. Their cover of "99 Red Balloons" is featured in the movies Not Another Teen Movie, Eurotrip, Our Lips Are Sealed, Rocket Power: Race Across New Zealand and Sonic the Hedgehog 3. Their cover of "More Today Than Yesterday" by Spiral Starecase is featured during the ending credits of The Waterboy. "Superman" is featured in the Disney film Meet the Deedles and the comedy Kingpin. "Walking in the Dark" is featured in the movie Dead Man on Campus. "Hopeless" appears on the soundtrack of BASEketball.

The band's video game debut was in Tony Hawk's Pro Skater with the song "Superman" and was reused as part of the soundtracks in Tony Hawk's Pro Skater HD and Tony Hawk's Pro Skater 1 + 2. Another song, "Spokesman", was used in Tony Hawk's Pro Skater 4. "I'm Down" was featured in the game MTV Sports: Skateboarding Ft Andy Macdonald. "99 Red Balloons" is also featured in Gran Turismo 3: A-Spec, as well as in Paramount Pictures' Sonic The Hedgehog 3, during the post title card sequence of Sonic, Tails and Knuckles having a race. Goldfinger's song "I Want" from Disconnection Notice is featured in Burnout Revenge on the PlayStation 2, Xbox, and Xbox 360, and is also featured in Burnout Legends on the PlayStation Portable."My Everything" is featured on SSX On Tour also by Electronic Arts. Goldfinger also appeared in the Reel Big Fish video "Sell Out" as a rival band at Mojo Records. The song "Counting the Days" is featured on Shaun White Snowboarding. The song "Superman" was released as downloadable content in the music videogame Rock Band 4.

== Band members ==
Current

- John Feldmann – lead vocals, rhythm guitar (1994–present), lead guitar (2013–2016)
- Charlie Paulson – lead guitar, backing vocals (1994–2001, 2005–2013, 2019–present)
- Philip Sneed – rhythm guitar (2019–present), lead guitar, backing vocals (2016–present)
- Mike Herrera – bass, backing vocals (2016–present)
- Nick Gross – drums (2020–present; touring 2018–2020)

Former

- Darrin Pfeiffer – drums, backing vocals (1994–2016)
- Simon Williams – bass, backing vocals (1994–1999)
- Steve Geiger – lead guitar (1994)
- Kelly LeMieux – bass, backing vocals (1999–2014, has played several shows in 2022–2024 with the band)
- Brian Arthur – lead guitar, backing vocals (2001–2005)

Touring

- Cyrus Bolooki – drums
- Jay Weinberg - drums

Timeline

== Discography ==
- Goldfinger (1996)
- Hang-Ups (1997)
- Stomping Ground (2000)
- Open Your Eyes (2002)
- Disconnection Notice (2005)
- Hello Destiny... (2008)
- The Knife (2017)
- Never Look Back (2020)
- Nine Lives (2026)

== See also ==
- Animal rights and punk subculture
