= Jay Rifkin =

American music and film producer

- Born: Los Angeles, California, United States
- Occupations: Record producer, film producer

Jay Rifkin is an American record and film producer.

Rifkin co-founded the company Media Ventures with Hans Zimmer, a childhood friend. As CEO of the company from 1988, Rifkin partnered with Zimmer to produce and to compose. Media Ventures is a diverse entertainment group that includes music, new media, film and television. The partnership earned them numerous awards and nominations, including Academy Award nominations, for the film scores of Driving Miss Daisy, Rain Man and The Lion King. After the success of The Lion King, Rifkin conceived and produced the platinum-selling follow-up album Rhythm of the Pride Lands.

Rifkin was also chairman of Media Revolution, a new media company, which he founded in 1996. Media Revolution was part of Cyberia Holdings, which Rifkin was also CEO of, and Hans Zimmer the vice-president. He was also a founder of the film production company Media Ventures Pictures and a producer of the comedy Waiting....

Rifkin was the managing partner of Media Ventures through his company Mojo Music, which he founded in 1995. In 1995, he started Mojo Records, which became a joint venture with Universal Records in 1996, and after producing multiple gold and platinum records, Mojo Records was subsequently sold to Zomba/BMG in 2001.

From 2005, Rifkin was chairman and CEO of China Youth Media Inc., a youth marketing and media company focused on China. He resigned the position on June 21, 2011, when the company merged with Midwest Energy Emissions Corp, for which Rifkin served as a Director, until November 9, 2015.

== Work ==
Rifkin's work includes:

- Target (1985) (Sound ((music)) / / Released / CBS Video)
- Rain Man – (Music / 1988 / Released / MGM Distribution Company)
- Days of Thunder – (Music / 1990 / Released / Paramount Pictures)
- Days of Thunder – (Song (("Show Me Heaven")) / 1990 / Released / Paramount Pictures)
- Days of Thunder (1990) (score mixer)
- Thelma & Louise (1991) (music recordist)
- Backdraft (1991) (music scoring mixer)
- Backdraft – (Music / / Released / Universal Pictures Distribution)
- Regarding Henry (1991) (music scoring mixer)
- The Power of One (1992) (music recordist)
- The Power of One – (Music / 1992 / Released / Warner Home Video)
- A League of Their Own (1992) (music mixer)
- Toys (1992) (score mixer) (score recordist)
- Toys – (Sound Mixer / 1992 / Released / 20th Century Fox International)
- True Romance (1993) (score mixer) (score recordist) ... aka Breakaway (Philippines: English title)
- The Lion King (1994) (producer, song "Hakuna Matata")
- Speed (1994/I) (music mixer) (music recordist)
- Speed – (Sound Mixer / 1994 / Released / 20th Century Fox Home Video)
- Renaissance Man – (Other / 1994 / Released / Buena Vista Pictures Distribution)
- Something to Talk About – (Sound Mixer / 1995 / Released / Warner Home Video)
- Man of the House (1995) (score mixer)
- Nine Months (1995) (score mixer)
- Crimson Tide – (Music / 1995 / Released / Hollywood Pictures Home Video)
- Antz – (Song (("I Can See Clearly Now")) / 1998 / Released / DreamWorks SKG)
- BASEketball (1998) (executive music producer)
- King of the Jungle – (Executive Producer / 2001 / Released / Urbanworld Films)
- The Lion King II: Simba's Pride (1998) (music and lyrics, song "He Lives in You")
- The Lion King II: Simba's Pride – (Songs / 1998 / Released / Walt Disney Home Video)
- Spirit: Stallion of the Cimarron – (Music Producer / 2002 / Released / DreamWorks SKG)
- Tears of the Sun – (Music Producer((Media Ventures)) / 2003 / Released / Sony Pictures Releasing)
- A League of Their Own – (Music / 2003 / Released / Sony Pictures Releasing)
- Waiting... – (Producer / 2005 / Released / Lions Gate Entertainment Corp.)
- Herzog in Wonderland – (Producer / / In-Production /)
- True Romance – (Sound Mixer / / Released / Morgan Creek International)
- Regarding Henry – (Music / / Released / Paramount Pictures)
- Radio Flyer – (Music / / Released / Sony Pictures Releasing)
- Pterodactyl Woman From Beverly Hills – (Executive Producer / / Released / Troma Team Video)
- Pacific Heights – (Music / / Released / 20th Century Fox International)
- Monkey Trouble – (Music Producer / / Released / New Line Home Entertainment)
- Man 2 Man – (Music / / Released / Walt Disney Home Video)
- Incident at Loch Ness – (Executive Producer / / Released / Eden Rock Media)
- I'll Do Anything – (Music / / Released / Sony Pictures Releasing)
- Drop Zone – (Music / / Released / Paramount Pictures)
- Driving Miss Daisy – (Music / / Released / Warner Bros. Pictures International)
- Cool Runnings – (Music / / Released / Walt Disney Home Video)
- Calendar Girl – (Music / / Released / Sony Pictures Releasing)
- Calendar Girl – (Song (("Cry For You")) / / Released / Sony Pictures Releasing)
- Calendar Girl – (Song / / Released / Sony Pictures Releasing)
- Black Rain – (Music / / Released / Paramount Pictures)
- Black Rain – (Song (("Living on the Edge of the Night")) by Jay Rifkin/ / Released / Paramount Pictures)
- Bird on a Wire – (Music / / Released / Universal Pictures Distribution)
- Freakonomics – (Executive Producer / 2010 / Released / Magnolia Pictures)
