= Buckcherry discography =

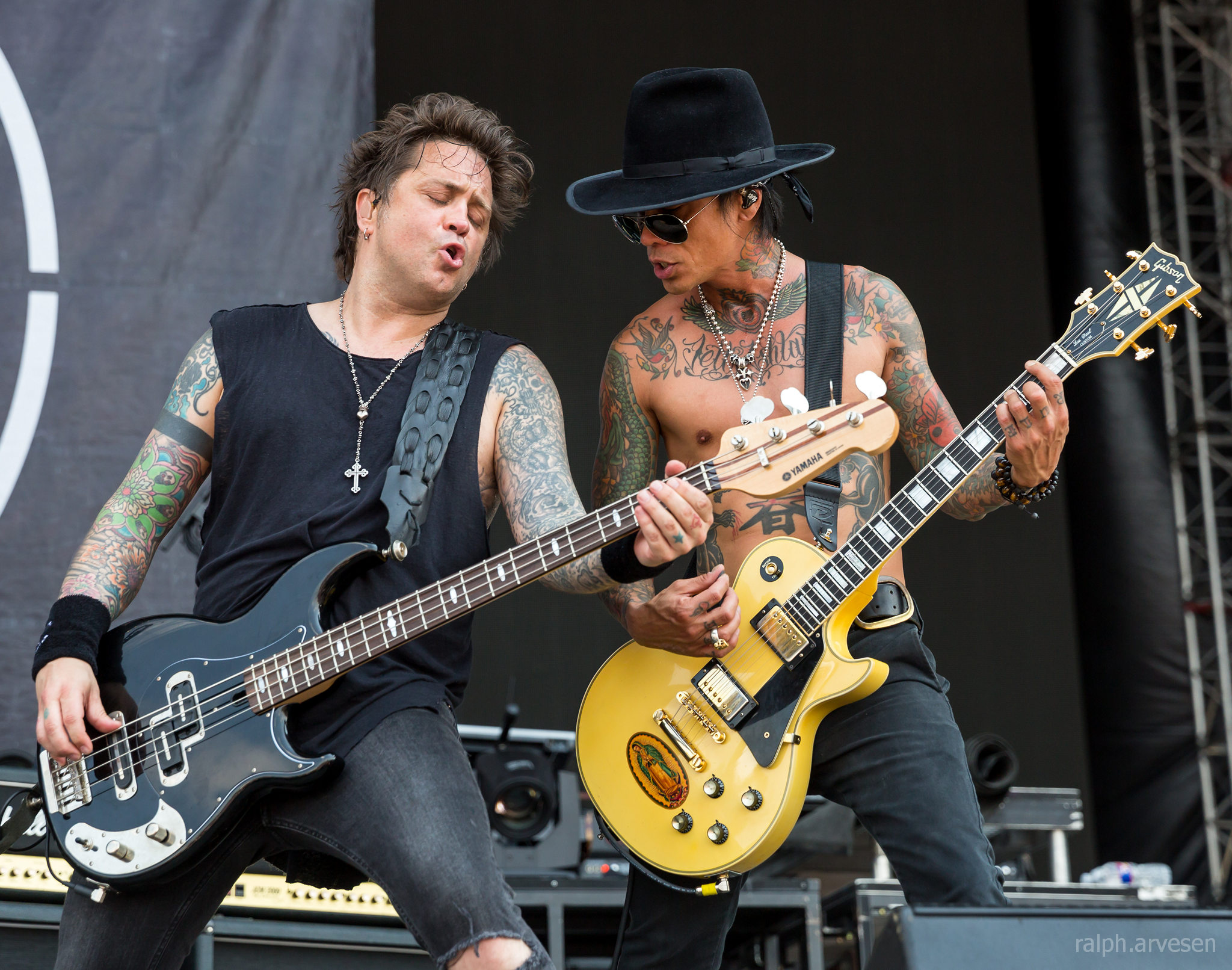
- Buckcherry performing in 2017
- Studio albums: 11
- Extended plays: 3
- Live albums: 1
- Compilation albums: 1
- Singles: 34
- Video albums: 1
- Music videos: 38

The discography of Buckcherry, a rock band from California, includes 11 studio albums, one live album, one video album, thirty-four singles and thirty-eight music videos.

Buckcherry released two albums, Buckcherry (1999) and Time Bomb (2001), before dissolving in the summer of 2002. In 2005, lead vocalist Josh Todd and lead guitarist Keith Nelson formed a new band using the Buckcherry moniker and released a new album on October 17, 2005, 15. It contained Buckcherry's biggest crossover hits to date, "Crazy Bitch", and their first Billboard Hot 100 top ten hit, "Sorry". Their fourth album, Black Butterfly, was released on September 16, 2008. Their fifth album, All Night Long, was released on August 3, 2010. Buckcherry released their sixth album, Confessions, on February 19, 2013. Their seventh studio album, Rock 'n' Roll, was released on August 21, 2015. That album was followed by Warpaint (2019), Hellbound (2021) and Vol. 10 (2023). Roar Like Thunder, their eleventh studio album, was released on June 13, 2025.

== Albums ==
=== Studio albums ===
List of studio albums, with selected details, chart positions and certifications
Title	Album details	Peak chart positions							Certifications
Title	Album details	US	US Rock	US Indie	US Heat	CAN	JPN	UK	Certifications
Buckcherry	Release date: April 6, 1999; Formats: CD, digital download; Label: DreamWorks	74	—	—	1	—	30	141	RIAA: Gold; MC: Gold
Time Bomb	Release date: March 27, 2001; Formats: CD, digital download; Label: DreamWorks	64	—	—	—	—	14	175	
15	Release date: October 17, 2005; Formats: CD, digital download; Label: Eleven Seven	39	8	2	—	43	20	—	RIAA: 2× Platinum; MC: Platinum
Black Butterfly	Release date: September 16, 2008; Formats: CD, digital download; Label: Eleven Seven	8	3	—	—	6	20	—	MC: Gold
All Night Long	Release date: August 3, 2010; Formats: CD, digital download; Label: Eleven Seven	10	3	3	—	7	39	57	
Confessions	Release date: February 19, 2013; Formats: CD, digital download; Label: Eleven Seven	20	7	5	—	—	49	—	
Rock 'n' Roll	Release date: August 21, 2015; Formats: CD, digital download; Label: F-Bomb	93	17	6	—	—	35	—	
Warpaint	Release date: March 8, 2019; Formats: CD, digital download; Label: Century Media	55	—	—	—	—	—	—	
Hellbound	Release date: June 25, 2021; Formats: CD, digital download; Label: Round Hill	—	—	—	—	—	—	30	
Vol. 10	Release date: June 2, 2023; Formats: CD, digital download; Label: Round Hill	—	—	—	—	—	—	63	
Roar Like Thunder	Release date: June 2025; Formats: CD, digital download; Label: Round Hill	—	—	—	—	—	47	—	
"—" denotes releases that did not chart

=== Live albums ===
List of live albums, with selected details and chart positions
Title	Album details	Peak chart positions	
Title	Album details	US	US Indie
Live & Loud 2009	Release date: September 29, 2009; Formats: CD, digital download; Label: Eleven Seven	172	30

=== Compilation albums ===
List of compilation albums
Title	Album details
The Best of Buckcherry	Release date: November 19, 2013; Formats: CD, digital download; Label: Eleven Seven
The Covers: Volume 1	Release date: July 1, 2014; Formats: CD; Label:

== Extended plays ==
List of EPs, with selected chart positions
Title	EP details	Peak chart positions
Title	EP details	US
Fuck	Release date: August 19, 2014; Formats: CD, digital download; Label: F-Bomb	38

== Singles ==
List of singles, with selected chart positions and certifications, showing year released and album name
Title	Year	Peak chart positions									Certifications	Album
Title	Year	US	US Adult	US Alt.	US Pop	US Main.	CAN	CAN Rock	NZ	UK	Certifications	Album
"Lit Up"	1999	—	—	33	—	1	—	1	—	87	RIAA: Gold	Buckcherry
"For the Movies"	1999	—	—	24	—	25	—	—	—	—		Buckcherry
"Dead Again"	1999	—	—	—	—	38	—	—	—	—		Buckcherry
"Check Your Head"	2000	—	—	—	—	29	—	—	—	—		Buckcherry
"Ridin'"	2001	—	—	—	—	9	—	—	—	—		Time Bomb
"Crazy Bitch"	2006	59	—	13	52	3	—	30	—	—	RIAA: 4× Platinum; RMNZ: Gold	15
"Next 2 You"	2006	—	—	—	—	18	—	—	—	—		15
"Everything"	2007	— (Note: "Everything" peaked at number 17 on the Billboard Bubbling Under Hot 100 Singles chart, which acts as an extension of the Billboard Hot 100.)	—	23	—	6	50	2	—	—		15
"Broken Glass"	2007	—	—	—	—	28	—	—	—	×		15
"Sorry"	2007	9	2	31	5	32	7	12	15	—	RIAA: 2× Platinum	15
"Too Drunk..."	2008	96	—	25	—	7	52	19	—	—		Black Butterfly
"Don't Go Away"	2008	—	28	—	—	—	—	—	—	—		Black Butterfly
"Rescue Me"	2008	—	—	—	—	11	—	11	—	—		Black Butterfly
"Talk to Me"	2009	—	—	—	—	17	—	17	—	—		Black Butterfly
"All Night Long"	2010	—	—	—	—	10	87	5	—	—		All Night Long
"Dead"	2010	—	—	—	—	17	—	30	—	—		All Night Long
"Christmas Is Here"	2010	—	—	—	—	—	—	49	—	—		Non-album single
"It's a Party"	2011	—	—	—	—	30	—	36	—	—		All Night Long
"Gluttony"	2012	—	—	—	—	24	—	3	—	—		Confessions
"Nothing Left But Tears"	2013	—	—	—	—	—	—	—	—	—		Confessions
"Wrath"	2013	—	—	—	—	—	—	—	—	—		Confessions
"Dreamin' of You"	2013	—	—	—	—	—	—	—	—	—		Confessions
"Bring It On Back"	2015	—	—	—	—	30	—	47	—	—		Rock 'n' Roll
"The Madness"	2015	—	—	—	—	—	—	—	—	—		Rock 'n' Roll
"The Feeling Never Dies"	2016	—	—	—	—	—	—	—	—	—		Rock 'n' Roll
"Head Like a Hole"	2018	—	—	—	—	—	—	—	—	—		Warpaint
"Bent"	2019	—	—	—	—	31	—	—	—	—		Warpaint
"Right Now"	2019	—	—	—	—	—	—	—	—	—		Warpaint
"Radio Song"	2019	—	—	—	—	—	—	—	—	—		Warpaint
"So Hott"	2021	—	—	—	—	—	—	—	—	—		Hellbound
"Hellbound"	2021	—	—	—	—	—	—	—	—	—		Hellbound
"Wasting No More Time"	2021	—	—	—	—	—	—	—	—	—		Hellbound
"Gun"	2021	—	—	—	—	—	—	—	—	—		Hellbound
"54321"	2022	—	—	—	—	—	—	—	—	—		Hellbound
"Good Time"	2023	—	—	—	—	—	—	—	—	—		Vol. 10
"Let's Get Wild"	2023	—	—	—	—	—	—	—	—	—		Vol. 10
"Shine Your Light"	2023	—	—	—	—	—	—	—	—	—		Vol. 10
"With You"	2023	—	—	—	—	—	—	—	—	—		Vol. 10
"Tell 'Em It's Christmas"	2023	—	—	—	—	—	—	—	—	—		Non-album single
"Roar Like Thunder"	2025	—	—	—	—	—	—	—	—	—		Roar Like Thunder
"Come On"	2025	—	—	—	—	—	—	—	—	—		Roar Like Thunder
"Set It Free"	2025	—	—	—	—	—	—	—	—	—		Roar Like Thunder
"—" denotes a recording that did not chart or was not released in that territory.

=== As featured artist ===
List of singles, with selected chart positions and certifications, showing year released and album name
Title	Year	Album
"Wild" (Moonshine Bandits featuring Buckcherry)	2023	Pour Decisions

== Promotional singles ==
Year	Single	Album
2001	"Slit My Wrists"	Time Bomb
2013	"Greed"	Confession
2013	"Lust"	Confession
2015	"Tight Pants"	Rock N Roll
2019	"Warpaint"	Warpaint

== Music videos ==
Title	Year	Director(s)	Album
"Lit Up"	1999	Mark Racco	Buckcherry
"For the Movies"	1999	David Meyers	Buckcherry
"Dead Again"	1999	Unknown	Buckcherry
"Check Your Head"	2000	David Meyers	Buckcherry
"Ridin'"	2001	Unknown	Time Bomb
"Crazy Bitch"	2006	P.R. Brown	15
"Next 2 You"	2006	Randee St. Nicholas	15
"Everything"	2007	Unknown	15
"Broken Glass"	2007	Unknown	15
"Sorry" (version 1)	2007	Unknown	15
"Sorry" (version 2)	2007	Unknown	15
"Too Drunk..."	2008	Unknown	Black Butterfly
"Don't Go Away"	2008	Unknown	Black Butterfly
"Rescue Me"	2008	Unknown	Black Butterfly
"Talk To Me"	2009	Unknown	Black Butterfly
"Highway Star" (version 1)	2009	Craig Barry	Black Butterfly
"Highway Star" (version 2)	2009	Craig Barry	Black Butterfly
"All Night Long"	2010	Unknown	All Night Long
"Dead"	2010	Unknown	All Night Long
"It's a Party"	2011	Unknown	All Night Long
"Gluttony"	2013	Billy Jayne	Confessions
"Nothing Left But Tears"	2013	Daniel Andres Gomez Bagby	Confessions
"Wrath"	2014	Billy Jayne	Confessions
"Dreamin' of You"	2014	Shan Dan	Confessions
"Say Fuck It"	2014	Billy Jayne	Fuck
"Somebody Fucked With Me"	2014	Unknown	Fuck
"Bring It On Back"	2015	Billy Jayne	Rock 'n' Roll
"The Madness"	2015	Unknown	Rock 'n' Roll
"Tight Pants"	2015	Daniel Kaufman	Rock 'n' Roll
"The Feeling Never Dies" (featuring Gretchen Wilson)	2016	Unknown	Rock 'n' Roll
"Head Like a Hole"	2018	Jeremy Saffer	Warpaint
"Bent"	2019	Phil Wallis	Warpaint
"Right Now"	2019	Billy Jayne	Warpaint
"Radio Song"	2019	Kurtis Imel	Warpaint
"So Hott"	2021	KasterTroy	Hellbound
"Hellbound"	2021	KasterTroy	Hellbound
"Wasting No More Time"	2021	KasterTroy	Hellbound
"Gun"	2021	Unknown	Hellbound
"54321"	2022	KasterTroy	Hellbound
"Good Time"	2023	Mike Watts and Tom Flynn	Vol. 10
"Shine Your Light"	2023	Unknown	Vol. 10
"Summer of '69"	2023	Mike Watts and Tom Flynn	Vol. 10
"Let's Get Wild"	2023	Unknown	Vol. 10
"Roar Like Thunder"	2025	Tom Flynn	Roar Like Thunder
"Set It Free"	2025	Mike Watts and Tom Flynn	Roar Like Thunder

== Soundtrack appearances ==
Year	Album details
2000	Road Trip "Anything, Anything (I'll Give You)" (Dramarama cover)
2000	Mission: Impossible 2 "Alone" (co-written with Hans Zimmer)
2002	The Banger Sisters "Crushed"
2012	Avengers Assemble "Wherever I Go"

== Video albums ==
Year	Album details
2009	Crüe Fest: Released: March 24, 2009; Label: Mötley, Eleven Seven; Format: DVD
