= Live & Loud 2009 =

Live album by Buckcherry
- Released: September 29, 2009
- Genre: Hard rock
- Length: 68:13
- Label: Eleven Seven; Atlantic

Buckcherry chronology
Black Butterfly (2008)	Live & Loud 2009 (2009)	All Night Long (2010)

Professional ratings
Review scores
Source	Rating
Allmusic	2/5 stars

Live & Loud 2009 is Buckcherry's first live album, released on September 29, 2009. The tracks were recorded during the band's live performance on May 5 at the Shaw Conference Centre in Edmonton, Alberta, Canada for the Cinco De Mayo Bash held by local radio station CFBR-FM as well as from performances in Medicine Hat, Calgary, Regina, Saskatoon and Vancouver. It features singles from past albums such as "Lit Up", "Ridin'", "Sorry", "Crazy Bitch", and "For the Movies" and songs from their 2008 album Black Butterfly.

== Track listing ==
1. "Tired of You" – 3:44
2. "Next 2 You" – 3:56
3. "Broken Glass" – 4:39
4. "Check Your Head" – 4:56
5. "Lit Up" – 4:42
6. "Talk to Me" – 3:48
7. "Rescue Me" – 3:48
8. "Rose" – 4:02
9. "For the Movies" – 5:13
10. "Ridin'" – 4:41
11. "Lawless and Lulu" – 4:27
12. "Everything" – 4:31
13. "Sorry" – 4:04
14. "Crazy Bitch" – 7:37
15. "Cream" – 4:05
