= Confessions (Buckcherry album) =

Studio album by Buckcherry
- Released: February 19, 2013
- Recorded: 2012
- Genre: Hard rock
- Length: 50:44
- Label: Century Media; Eleven Seven
- Producer: Buckcherry

Buckcherry chronology
| All Night Long (2010) | Confessions (2013) | Fuck (2014) |

Alternate cover
- Outer cover artwork for Confessions.

Singles from Confessions
- 1. "Gluttony" Released: December 19, 2012; 2. "Nothing Left But Tears" Released: 2013; 3. "Wrath" Released: October 2013; 4. "Dreamin of You" Released: 2014

Professional ratings
Review scores
| Source | Rating |
|---|---|
| AllMusic | 3/5 stars |

Confessions is the sixth studio album by the American hard rock band Buckcherry. The album was released on February 19, 2013. It is the last Buckcherry album to feature the 15-era lineup, as bassist Jimmy Ashhurst departed the group later in 2013. Additionally, all other members of this lineup other than vocalist Josh Todd and guitarist Stevie D left by the end of 2017 shortly after the release of the band's follow-up album Rock 'n' Roll.

Seven of the tracks on the album are named after the seven deadly sins.

== Artwork ==
Before posting the official cover art on January 25, 2013, Buckcherry also posted artwork for an outer cover, they described as a "...book "cover" - and then when it's opened you'll get the true cover of the album itself." The day after, the band posted a picture of the official artwork, stating "We wanted our album cover artwork to be symbolic and encompass the subject matter of the record in an image that's cool enough to be tattooed. Hope you like it."

== Commercial performance ==
The album debuted at No. 20 on Billboard 200, as well as No. 1 on the Hard Rock Albums chart, with 18,000 copies sold in its first week. The album has sold 55,000 copies in the U.S. as of August 2015.

== Track listing ==
| No. | Title | Writer(s) | Length |
|---|---|---|---|
| 1. | "Gluttony" | Josh Todd; Keith Nelson | 2:41 |
| 2. | "Wrath" | Todd; Nelson; James Ashhurst | 3:53 |
| 3. | "Nothing Left but Tears" | Todd; Nelson; Ashhurst | 3:12 |
| 4. | "The Truth" | Todd; Nelson; Marti Frederiksen | 4:05 |
| 5. | "Greed" | Todd; Nelson | 4:22 |
| 6. | "Water" | Todd; Nelson; Ashhurst | 4:38 |
| 7. | "Seven Ways to Die" | Todd; Nelson | 3:53 |
| 8. | "Air" | Todd; Nelson; Ashhurst; Frederiksen | 4:14 |
| 9. | "Sloth" | Todd; Nelson | 4:03 |
| 10. | "Pride" | Todd; Nelson; Ashhurst | 4:34 |
| 11. | "Envy" | Todd; Nelson; Ashhurst; Steve Dacanay | 4:16 |
| 12. | "Lust" | Todd; Nelson; Dacanay | 3:32 |
| 13. | "Dreamin' of You" | Todd; Nelson; Frederiksen | 3:21 |
| Total length: | | | 50:44 |

Deluxe edition bonus tracks
| No. | Title | Length |
|---|---|---|
| 14. | "Give 'Em What They Want" |
| 15. | "When the Fire Starts" |

iTunes deluxe edition bonus tracks
| No. | Title | Length |
|---|---|---|
| 16. | "Gluttony (radio edit)" | 2:44 |
| 17. | "Gluttony (music video)" | 2:44 |
| 18. | "Making of Gluttony (video)" | 3:54 |

Record Store Day stores exclusive download-only track
| No. | Title | Length |
|---|---|---|
| 14. | "Greed (demo version)" | 4:30 |

Japanese edition bonus tracks
| No. | Title | Length |
|---|---|---|
| 14. | "Wherever I Go" (from The Avengers Assemble Soundtrack) | 4:13 |
| 15. | "Rescue Me" (live) | 3:48 |
| Total length: | | 58:56 |

Deluxe edition DVD
| No. | Title | Length |
|---|---|---|
| 1. | "The Story Behind "Confessions"" |
| 2. | "Gluttony" (official music video) |
| 3. | "On the Set: Gluttony Video Shoot" |
| 4. | "Gluttony" (official lyric video) |

== Personnel ==
- Josh Todd – lead vocals
- Keith Nelson – lead guitar, backing vocals
- Stevie D. – rhythm guitar, backing vocals
- Jimmy "Two Fingers" Ashhurst – bass guitar, backing vocals
- Xavier Muriel – drums, percussion

== Charts ==
| Chart (2013) | Peak position |
|---|---|
| US Billboard 200 | 20 |
| US Top Alternative Albums (Billboard) | 6 |
| US Independent Albums (Billboard) | 5 |
| US Top Hard Rock Albums (Billboard) | 1 |
| US Top Rock Albums (Billboard) | 7 |
