= Too Drunk... =

Single by Buckcherry

from the album Black Butterfly
- Released: July 2008
- Recorded: 2008
- Genre: Hard rock
- Length: 4:01
- Label: Eleven Seven; Atlantic
- Songwriters: Josh Todd; Keith Nelson; Marti Frederiksen

Buckcherry singles chronology
"Sorry" (2007)	"Too Drunk..." (2008)	"Don't Go Away" (2008)

"Too Drunk..." is a song by American rock band Buckcherry. It was released in July 2008 as the lead single from the band's fourth album Black Butterfly. The song is about a man drinking all night and all day, and having the girl of his desire walk away because he's "too drunk to fuck". The song was apparently leaked by the band's manager in 2008, yet the band later claimed that the track was pirated.

The song was removed from re-releases and clean versions of the album and replaced by their cover of "Highway Star" from Deep Purple that was used by NASCAR on TNT as its 2009 theme song. "Too Drunk..." also does not appear on the Spotify version of the album.

== Background ==
Lead singer Josh Todd said the song was inspired by his experiences playing house parties in Orange County, California when he was too young to perform in clubs. It contains sexual lyrics such as "I got so many women coming after me I put some pussy on layaway", but Todd defended himself and said he was not sexist, as he has "lived a colorful life, so it’s fun to talk about it and then beat it into shape, so that a lot of people can relate to it."

The song was leaked online ahead of its scheduled release date, with speculations that it was done so by the band's management team.

The song was removed from the Black Butterfly album for its second pressing, replaced by a cover of Deep Purple's "Highway Star", which the band recorded for TNT's coverage of the 2009 NASCAR Sprint Cup Series. Todd said, "That was our [then] manager’s idea at the time. Actually, I don’t know why he took that off the record. 'Too Drunk…' is a great song if you ask me."

== Music video ==
The video features a house party, during which the band is shown playing, and a couple are shown having sex in various places. Pornographic actors Ashlynn Brooke and Tommy Gunn (her then boyfriend) make cameos as the couple engaged in the act. Brooke and Gunn engaged in simulated sex for the video.

== Reception ==
The Salt Lake City Weekly gave a negative review of the song, stating: "OK, you’re badasses. Too drunk to fuck and you'll be in rehab by 30, but badasses."

== Charts ==
=== Weekly charts ===
Weekly chart performance for "Too Drunk..."
Chart (2008)	Peak position
Canada Hot 100 (Billboard)	52
Canada Rock (Billboard)	19
US Billboard Hot 100	96
US Alternative Airplay (Billboard)	25
US Mainstream Rock (Billboard)	7

=== Year-end charts ===
Year-end chart performance for "Too Drunk..."
Chart (2008)	Position
US Mainstream Rock Songs (Billboard)	36
