= Year of the Tiger (disambiguation) =

Year of the Tiger is a year in the Chinese zodiac.

== Film and television ==
- A Yank in Viet-Nam, originally to be called Year of the Tiger, a 1964 film
- The Year of the Tiger (2011 film), a Chilean drama film
- The Year of the Tiger (2023 film), a Peruvian-Dominican crime comedy film
- A Yank in Viet-Nam, originally to be called Year of the Tiger, a 1964 film

== Music ==
- Year of the Tiger (La! Neu? album), 1998
- Year of the Tiger (Josh Todd & The Conflict album), 2017
- Year of the Tiger (Myles Kennedy album), 2018
