= Liacouras Center =

Multi-purpose indoor arena in Philadelphia, Pennsylvania, U.S.

- The Apollo; The Pete
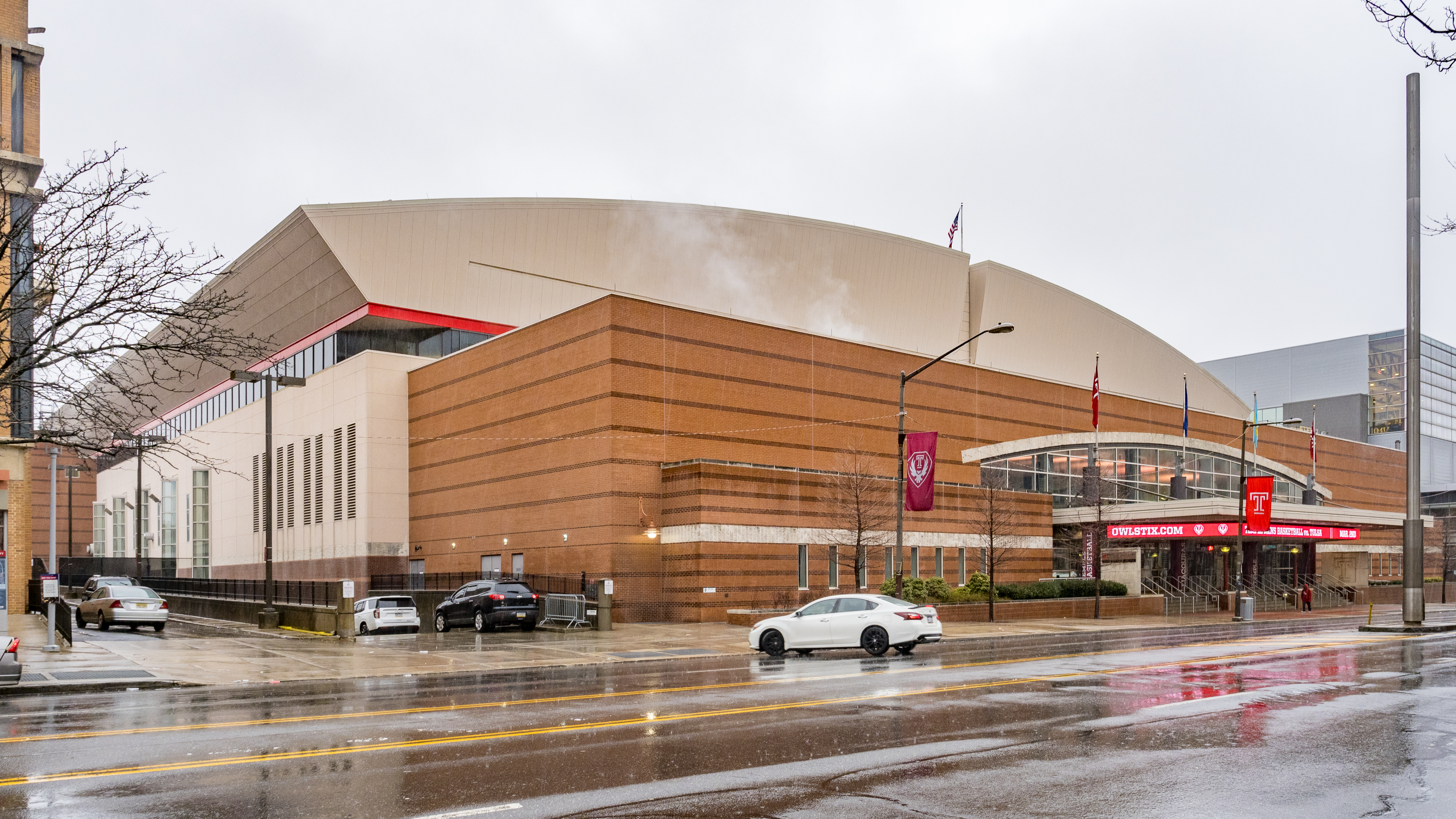
- Interactive map of Liacouras Center
- Former names: The Forum at The Apollo of Temple (1997–2000)
- Address: 1776 North Broad Street
- Location: Philadelphia, Pennsylvania, U.S.
- Coordinates: 39°58′47″N 75°9′31″W
- Owner: Temple University
- Operator: Oak View Group
- Capacity: 10,206; ~5,000 (theater mode)
- Public transit: SEPTA Metro: (Cecil B. Moore); SEPTA bus: 3, 4, 16

Construction
- Groundbreaking: January 25, 1996
- Opened: November 11, 1997
- Cost: $73 million
- Architects: Vitetta Group; Thompson, Ventulett, Stainback & Associates
- General contractor: LF Driscoll

Tenants
- Temple Owls (NCAA) (1997–present); Philadelphia KiXX (MISL) (2009–2010)

Website
- liacourascenter.com

The Liacouras Center is a 10,206-seat multi-purpose venue located on the campus of Temple University in North Philadelphia. Opened in 1997, the arena was originally named The Forum at The Apollo of Temple and was renamed in 2000 for university president Peter J. Liacouras. It is part of a $107 million, four-building complex along North Broad Street. The Liacouras Center is the largest indoor, public assembly venue in Philadelphia north of City Hall.

== History ==
During the 1980s, Temple basketball coach John Chaney sought to raise the profile of the men's basketball program through aggressively scheduling top-tier, out of conference opponents. Some programs, however, scoffed at the idea of playing at Temple's 3,900-seat on-campus arena, McGonigle Hall. Temple's president at the time, Peter J. Liacouras, supported the idea of a larger basketball facility in hopes of building Temple's national presence. Temple considered several locations and a site was purchased in 1988 for $7.3 million. The state of Pennsylvania awarded Temple $31.1 million in October 1992, despite disagreements between Chaney and then-City Council president John Street.

The project was approved in 1995, with a January 25, 1996 groundbreaking. Two nationally recognized architectural firms designed the building: Vitetta Group of Philadelphia, and Thompson Ventulett Stainback & Associates of Atlanta. The 340,000 sq ft (32,000 m^{2}) venue opened in the 1997–98 season. The first game played was a 76–61 Temple win over Fresno State.

The venue was originally named The Forum at The Apollo of Temple. The name changed to the Liacouras Center just prior to Liacouras' retirement on February 13, 2000.

The Liacouras Center is managed by Spectra Experiences (previously called Global Spectrum), a subsidiary of Comcast-Spectacor. The Liacouras Center is Philadelphia's largest indoor venue north of City Hall and hosts home games for all of Temple men's basketball, along with some women's games. As of the end of the 2016-17 season, the Owls have amassed a 206–69 record in the building. The Esther Boyer Theater at the Liacouras Center is a small theater setup of 1,000 to 5,000 seats for more intimate presentations. The complex also houses the Independence Blue Cross Recreation Center (IBC), which includes a gym, basketball court, racquetball courts, and more. The IBC opened in the spring semester of 1998. The fourth building in the complex is a 1,200-space parking garage.

== Use beyond basketball ==
Besides hosting Temple basketball games, the Liacouras Center is a full entertainment arena featuring concerts, family shows, Philadelphia KiXX games, Philly Roller Derby bouts, dramatic presentations, and family shows. Additionally, several high school graduations, as well as university graduations and convocation ceremonies, are held there.

=== Professional wrestling ===
On October 16, 2019, All Elite Wrestling (AEW) held its third televised professional wrestling event at the Liacouras Center, broadcast on the TNT network in the United States. AEW returned to the Liacouras Center for its second anniversary show on October 6, 2021.

On April 5, 2024, Ring of Honor (ROH - the sister promotion of AEW), promoted its Supercard of Honor event at the Liacouras Center.

On April 6, 2025, AEW return with their pay-per-view, Dynasty.

=== Sport wrestling ===
On April 18, 2026, Real American Freestyle presented RAF 08 from the venue, an event that was broadcast live on Fox Nation.

=== Pandemic era hospital ===
In March 2020, the Liacouras Center was transformed into a field hospital with 200 beds arranged on the court in anticipation of a surge in need during the onset of the COVID-19 pandemic and shortages in city hospitals. At the end of April 2020, operations of the field hospital began winding down as the rate of new COVID-19 cases in Philadelphia began to decline.

== Past events ==
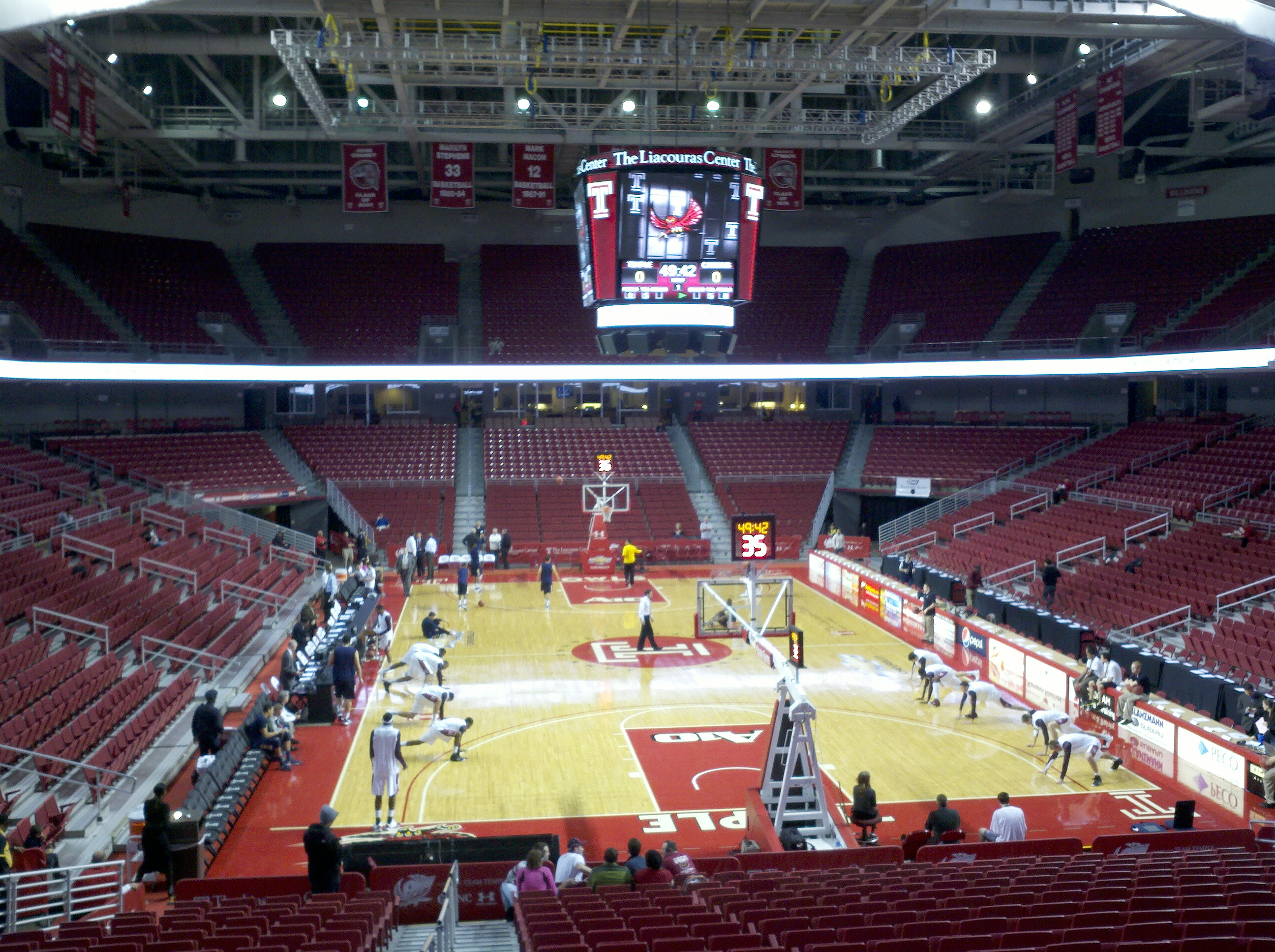
December 2012

=== Music ===
==== Rap and hip-hop ====
- 50 Cent
- Fat Joe
- Fetty Wap
- Bow Wow and Omarion
- Kid Cudi
- Method Man & Redman
- Kanye West
- Wale
- Wiz Khalifa
- Big Sean
- Super Jam 2010, featuring Trey Songz and Ludacris
- T.I.
- Nelly
- Ludacris (October 2014)
- A$AP Rocky
- Playboi Carti
- A Boogie wit da Hoodie
- Sexyy Red

==== Rock and pop ====
- Bob Dylan
- Phil Lesh and Friends
- Maroon 5
- John Mayer
- Counting Crows
- Natalie Merchant
- Muse
- Goo Goo Dolls
- Green Day
- R.E.M.
- Automatic Black
- Clay Aiken/Kelly Clarkson
- Of Monsters and Men
- My Chemical Romance
- Bastille
- The Chainsmokers
- Bassnectar

==== R&B ====
- Sam Smith (January 13, 2015)
- Alicia Keys
- Patti LaBelle
- Luther Vandross

==== Country ====
- LeAnn Rimes
- Carrie Underwood with Little Big Town

=== Entertainment ===
- Jamie Foxx
- Fat Albert (film; world premiere)
- Wheel of Fortune
- Steve Harvey
- Katt Williams
- Theresa Caputo (October 2014)
- Martin Lawrence

=== Politics and government ===
- Barack Obama (November 2, 2014)
- Bernie Sanders (April 6, 2016)
- Barack Obama, Joe Biden, Josh Shapiro, and John Fetterman (November 5, 2022)
- Donald Trump (June 22, 2024)
- Kamala Harris (August 6, 2024, to introduce Tim Walz as vice-presidential nominee)
- Barack Obama, Cherelle Parker, Bob Casey Jr, Bruce Springsteen, and John Legend in support of Kamala Harris (October 28, 2024)

=== Sports ===
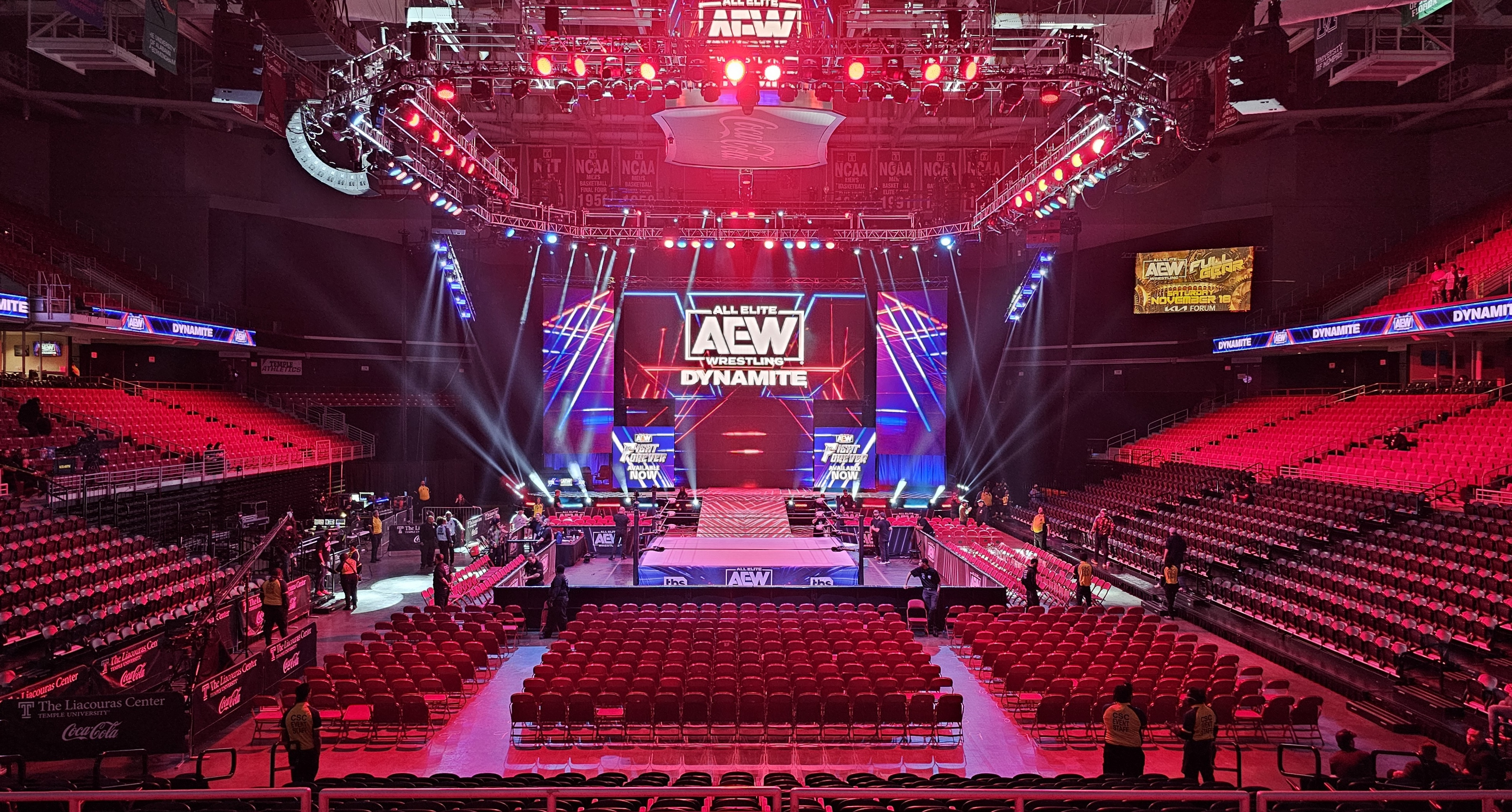
The Liacouras Center prior to the filming of AEW Dynamite and Rampage, October 25, 2023

- Bernard Hopkins vs. Enrique Ornelas (December 2, 2009)
- NCAA Women's Division I Basketball Tournament (2004; Opening Round)
- TNA Wrestling's Lockdown (April 19, 2009)
- TNA Wrestling's Bound for Glory (October 16, 2011)
- The Harlem Globetrotters
- U.S. Gymnastics Championships (2001)
- USA Gymnastics American Cup
- Sugar Ray Leonard Boxing
- David Reid Boxing
- Philadelphia 76ers Exhibition Game
- 2017 International WFTDA Championships (roller derby)
- AEW's Dynamite (October 16, 2019)
- AEW's Dynamite Special Episode: 2 Year Anniversary (October 6, 2021)
- AEW's Dynamite and Rampage (October 25, 2023)
- ROH's Supercard of Honor (April 5, 2024)
- AEW's Dynasty (April 6, 2025)

== See also ==
- List of NCAA Division I basketball arenas
