= William Jacoby (actor) =

American actor (born 1969)

Billy Jayne
- Born: William Jayne; April 10, 1969 (age 57); Flushing, Queens, New York City, U.S.
- Other name: Billy Jacoby
- Occupation: Actor
- Years active: 1972–present

William Jayne (born April 10, 1969), known professionally as Billy Jayne and previously Billy Jacoby, is an American actor, known for his roles in the teen comedy film Just One of the Guys (1985) and in the teen sitcom Parker Lewis Can't Lose (1990–1993). His siblings, Robert Jayne, Susan Jayne, Laura Jacoby, and his half-brother Scott Jacoby are also actors.

== Early life ==
Jayne was born in Flushing, Queens, New York City, on April 10, 1969. He is of Jewish descent. At the age of three, he was visiting his older half-brother Scott Jacoby on the set of That Certain Summer, for which Scott won an Emmy for Best Supporting Actor. The director needed someone to play Jacoby in flashbacks, and Jayne was selected and began his career.

Although Jayne's birth name was not Jacoby, when he started his career his mother thought it would be best if he used Jacoby, the last name of his already established half-brother. At the age of 17, Billy Jacoby changed his professional name to Billy Jayne to coincide with his birth name.

== Career ==
Jayne was a child actor from the early to late 1980s, starring in numerous guest appearances on TV shows such as Trapper John, M.D., The Golden Girls as Blanche's 14-year-old rebellious grandson David, The A-Team, and 21 Jump Street. He is also known for the role of Buddy, the brother of Terry, in Just One of the Guys from 1985.

From 1990 to 1993, Jayne starred in the teen sitcom Parker Lewis Can't Lose alongside actor Corin Nemec. After the series ended, he had smaller roles in shows such as Renegade, Murder One (1995), Walker, Texas Ranger (1996), Charmed (1999) and Cold Case (2009).

== Filmography ==
=== Film ===
Year	Title	Role
1979	The Runner Stumbles	James
1979	Sunnyside	Billy Martin
1981	Back Roads	Boy Thief
1981	Bloody Birthday	Curtis Taylor
1982	Hospital Massacre	Young Harold Rusk
1982	The Beastmaster	Young Dar
1982	Superstition	Justin Leahy
1983	Man, Woman and Child	Davey Ackerman
1983	Cujo	Brett Camber
1983	Nightmares	Zock Maxwell
1984	Reckless	David Prescott
1985	Just One of the Guys	Buddy Griffith
1987	Party Camp	District Attorney
1988	Demonwarp	Tom Phillips
1989	Dr. Alien	Wesley Littlejohn
1989	The 'Burbs	voice
1999	Road Kill	Lars
2000	The Crew	Young Tony 'Mouth' Donato

=== Television ===
Year	Title	Role	Notes
1977	ABC Afterschool Specials	Ivan	Episode "The Horrible Honchos"
1978	Little Lulu	Alvin	TV movie
1979	The Big Hex of Little Lulu	Alvin	TV movie
1979–1980	Scooby-Doo and Scrappy-Doo	Additional voices	
1979–1980	The Bad News Bears	Rudi Stein	Main role
1980	Lou Grant	Mike	Episode "Cover-Up"
1980	Galactica 1980	Tucker	Episode "Galactica Discovers Earth: Part 3"
1980	CBS Library	Oscar	Episode "Animal Talk"
1980	The Magical World of Disney	David Williams	2 episodes
1980	The Ghosts of Buxley Hall	David Williams	TV movie
1980	Angel on My Shoulder	Joe Navotny	TV movie
1980	Trapper John, M.D.	Tommy	Episode "Hot Line"
1981	Hart to Hart	Herbie Geller	Episode "Hart-Shaped Murder"
1981	Crazy Times	Older Boy	TV movie
1981	Murder in Texas	Mel Kurth	TV movie
1981	How to Eat Like a Child	Billy	TV movie
1981–1982	Maggie	Mark Weston	Main role
1981	Alice	Jeff	Episode "Alice's Halloween Surprise"
1982	Code Red	Luther	Episode "My Life Is Yours"
1982	American Playhouse	Newsboy	Episode "Working"
1982	Seven Brides for Seven Brothers	Eddie Barton	Episode "Neighbors"
1982–1983	The Scooby & Scrappy-Doo/Puppy Hour	voice, Petey the Puppy	
1982–1984	The Puppy's Further Adventures	voice, Petey the Puppy	
1983	ABC Weekend Special	Bill	Episode "The Red Room Riddle"
1983	Benson	'Buzzy' Sheridan	Episode "Katie's Boyfriend"
1983	The A-Team	Nicky	Episode "The Out-of-Towners"
1983	It's Not Easy	Matthew Townsend	Main role
1984	Tales from the Darkside	Petey Coombs	Episode "The New Man"
1984	Highway to Heaven	Brad Gaines	Episode "Dust Child"
1985	The Golden Girls	David	Episode "On Golden Girls"
1986	The A-Team	Jeffrey Sullivan	Episode "The Trouble with Harry"
1986	The Wizard	Jack Craig	Episode "El Dorado"
1986	The Magical World of Disney	Whittle	Episode "The B.R.A.T. Patrol"
1986	Lazer Tag Academy	voice, Tom Jaren	
1985–1987	Silver Spoons	Brad Langford	Recurring role (Seasons 4–5)
1987	Rags to Riches	Jim	Episode "Bad Blood"
1987	21 Jump Street	Mark Dorian	Episode "America, What a Town"
1987	A Year in the Life	Jerry	Episode "EM7, Raiders Minus 3 and a Half for a Nickel"
1988	The Charmings	Al	Episode "The Charmings Get Robbed"
1988	The Bronx Zoo	Brad	Episode "On the Land, on the Sea and in the Halls"
1989	The Young Riders	Bil	Episode "Ten-Cent Hero"
1990	CBS Schoolbreak Special	Bill McCallister	Episode "The Girl with the Crazy Brother", as William Jayne
1990–1993	Parker Lewis Can't Lose	Mikey Randall	Main role
1995	Renegade	Otis Moon	Episode "Living Legend"
1995	Spring Fling!	Chris	TV movie
1995	The Client	T.J. Rutherford	Episode "A Perfect World"
1995	Murder One	Billy McBride	Episode "Chapter Five"
1996	Walker, Texas Ranger	Derek Malloy	Episode "Flashpoint"
1996	Breaking Through	Mike	TV movie
1997	Extreme Ghostbusters	voice	Episode "Bird of Prey"
1999	Charmed	Billy Waters	Episode "The Wendigo"
2003	The Bernie Mac Show	Coach	Episode "Eye of the Tiger"
2009	Cold Case	Al 'Baltimore Red'	Episode "November 22nd"
2010	United States of Tara	Ed	Episode "Open House"
2016	Conspiracy	John 'John Q'	TV movie
2023	MILF Manor	Himself	Episode "I Ain't Your MILF"

=== As director ===
Year	Title	Notes
2013	Buckcherry: Gluttony	music video
2014	BuckCherry: Wrath	music video
2014	Buckcherry: Say Fuck It	music video
2015	Buckcherry: Bring It On Back	music video
2018	Josh Todd and The Conflict: Story of my Life	music video
2017	Louise Goffin: Let Me in Again	music video
2017	Josh Todd and The Conflict: rain	music video

== Bibliography ==
- Holmstrom, John. The Moving Picture Boy: An International Encyclopaedia from 1895 to 1995. Norwich, Michael Russell, 1996, p. 371.
