= Gregg Cash =

- Genres: Hard rock, Rock, R&B, Funk
- Occupations: Musician, Music Director
- Instrument: Bass guitar
- Labels: Century Media, Roc Nation

Gregg Cash (born September 6, 1985) is a Philadelphia born, Los Angeles based bass guitarist & Music Director best known as a current member of the hard rock band Josh Todd and the Conflict alongside Buckcherry founder Josh Todd and Buckcherry guitarist Stevie D. The band's debut album Year Of The Tiger was released September 2017. Cash is also known for his work as the former bassist in Dorothy on Jay Z's Roc Nation record label. Dorothy was ranked #14 on RollingStone Magazine's 50 best new bands in 2014. Cash is currently a sponsored player by Orange Amps.

== Equipment ==
Cash is known for his aggressive playing and low hanging bass.

Bass guitars

- Vintage Fender Precision Bass
- Fender Precision Bass
- Fender Jazz Bass
- Vintage JB Player
- Guild Starfire bass
- Wild Custom Guitars Press TV-Bass
- The Jit Bag (signature)

Amplifiers

- Orange OB1-500 (Bass Head)
- Orange OBC410 (bass cabinets)

Effects

- Tech 21 SansAmp Bass Driver DI
- One Pot- Ca$h Hyper Fuzz (Signature pedal)
- MXR M89 Bass Overdrive
