= Spraygun War =

American hip hop group

Spraygun War is an American electronic/rap band from Los Angeles. It consists of members Josh Todd and Stevie D (Stevie Dacanay). The two are also members of the rock band Buckcherry. The band's debut recording, Into the Blackness, was released on June 10, 2016, without a label. Conceptually, the EP deals with Josh Todd's path to enlightenment, and features their single "OMG". The majority of the critical response towards Spraygun War has been coarse, with website MetalSucks referring to them as "terrible".

== Band members ==
- Josh Todd – lead vocals, piano, additional guitar (2015–present)
- Stevie D. – rhythm and lead guitar, backing vocals (2015–present)

== Discography ==
- Into the Blackness (EP) (2016)
- OMG (single) (2016)
