= Margie Impert =

American film, stage and television actress

- Impert in Spencer's Pilots, 1976
- Born: Mary Margaret Impert; June 4, 1946 (age 80); Horseheads, New York, U.S.
- Education: Rollins College; New York University
- Occupations: Film, stage and television actress
- Years active: 1961–1986

Mary Margaret Impert (born June 4, 1946) is an American film, stage and television actress. She is best known for playing the recurring role of Mark Gordon's cousin Diane in the American fantasy drama television series Highway to Heaven.

== Life and career ==
Impert was born in Horseheads, New York. She attended and graduated from Horseheads High School. After graduating Rollins College and New York University. She began her stage career in 1961, appearing in the stage play Happy Journey. She appeared in such other plays as Look We've Come Through and Under the Yum Yum Tree. She then began her screen career in 1967, appearing in the ABC crime drama television series N.Y.P.D. In 1969, she appeared in the CBS soap opera television series Guiding Light.

Later in her career, in 1976, Impert starred as Linda Dann in the CBS adventure television series Spencer's Pilots, starring along with Gene Evans, Christopher Stone, Todd Susman and Britt Leach. From 1981 to 1982, she starred as Chris in the ABC sitcom television series Maggie, starring along with Miriam Flynn, James Hampton, Doris Roberts, Judith-Marie Bergan, Billy Jayne and Christian Jacobs. She guest-starred in television programs including Another World, M*A*S*H, Barnaby Jones, The Rockford Files, Kolchak: The Night Stalker and Knots Landing, and played the recurring role of Madeline Jones in the CBS crime drama television series Magnum, P.I. She also appeared in films such as The Howling and The Star Chamber.

Impert last appeared in the NBC fantasy drama television series Highway to Heaven, playing Mark Gordon's cousin Diane from 1985 to 1986.

== Filmography ==
=== Film ===
Year	Title	Role	Notes
1981	The Howling	Donna	
1983	The Star Chamber	Louise Rachmil	

=== Television ===
Year	Title	Role	Notes
1967–1969	N.Y.P.D.	Roomate / Roommate	2 episodes; credited as Margaret Impert
1969	Guiding Light	Maggie Wexler	1 episode; credited as Margaret Impert
1970–1971	Search for Tomorrow	Maggie	2 episodes
1971–1972	Another World	Rachel Davis Matthews	2 episodes
1975	Kolchak: The Night Stalker	Betty Walker	1 episode; credited as Margaret Impert
1975	The Six Million Dollar Man	2nd Nurse	1 episode; credited as Margaret Impert
1975	Doctors' Hospital		1 episode
1975	Cannon	Sondra Munson	1 episode; credited as Margaret Impert
1976	Spencer's Pilots	Linda Dann	11 episodes; credited as Margaret Impert
1977	Rosetti and Ryan	Helen	1 episode
1977	The Rockford Files	Susan Kenniston	1 episode; credited as Margaret Impert
1977	Vanities		Television film
1979	Barnaby Jones	Adrienne Rexford	2 episodes; credited as Margaret Impert
1979	Crisis in Mid-air	Maggie Johnson	Television film; credited as Margaret Impert
1979	The Incredible Hulk	Jean	1 episode
1979	A Christmas for Boomer	Marsha Sinclair	Television film
1980	Knots Landing	Lt. Larkin	1 episode
1980	Lou Grant	Marcy	1 episode
1981	M*A*S*H	Lt. Sandra Palmer, RN	1 episode
1981	Palmerstown, U.S.A.	Katey Bragdon	1 episode
1981–1982	Maggie	Chris	8 episodes
1982–1985	Magnum, P.I.	Madeline Jones	3 episodes
1983	Trauma Center	Mrs. Evans	1 episode
1984	Too Close for Comfort	Joanna McGill	1 episode
1984	A Doctor's Story	Magda	Television film
1984	Santa Barbara	News Reporter	1 episode
1985	Berrenger's	Reporter	1 episode
1985	Michael Nesmith in Television Parts		1 episode
1985–1986	Highway to Heaven	Diane Wilson	5 episodes
