= Josh Todd and the Conflict =

American hard rock band

- Origin: Los Angeles, California, U.S.
- Genres: Hard rock, rap rock
- Years active: 2017 –present
- Labels: Century Media
- Members: Josh Todd; Stevie D Gregg Cash; Sean Winchester
- Website: http://www.centurymedia.com/artist.aspx?IdArtist=1951

Josh Todd and the Conflict is an American hard rock band formed by Buckcherry members Josh Todd (vocals) and Stevie D (guitarist). The band released their debut album Year of The Tiger in September 2017. The album was co-produced by Stevie D and Stone Temple Pilots drummer Eric Kretz.

== Band members ==
=== Current members ===
- Josh Todd – lead vocals
- Stevie D. – guitar, backing vocals
- Gregg Cash – Bass guitar
- Sean Winchester – drums

== Discography ==
Studio albums

- Year of The Tiger (2017)
