= All Night Long (Buckcherry album) =

Studio album by Buckcherry
- Released: August 3, 2010
- Recorded: Late 2009 – early 2010
- Genre: Hard rock
- Length: 43:00
- Label: Eleven Seven; Atlantic
- Producer: Buckcherry

Buckcherry chronology
Live & Loud 2009 (2009)	All Night Long (2010)	Confessions (2013)

Singles from All Night Long
- 1. "All Night Long" Released: May 18, 2010; 2. "Dead" Released: October 2010; 3. "It's a Party" Released: December 2010

Professional ratings
Aggregate scores
Source	Rating
Metacritic	(64/100)
Review scores
Source	Rating
Allmusic	3/5 stars
Sleaze Roxx	4/5 stars
The New Review	4/5 stars
They Will Rock You	3.5/5 stars
Hard Rock Hideout	8/10 stars
Rock Sound	9/10 stars
OneMetal	4/5 stars
Mojo Radio	9.5/10 stars
SPIN	5/10 stars
Entertainment Weekly	C+
Rolling Stone	3/5 stars

All Night Long is the fifth studio album by the American hard rock band Buckcherry. It was released worldwide on August 3, 2010.

== Promotion and release ==
In an online video singer Josh Todd and guitarist Keith Nelson heavily hinted at several track titles that will feature on the upcoming album. The title track was available for free download on May 4, 2010, via their Facebook and Twitter accounts.

They also released another new song called "Our World" in aid of the BP disaster in the Gulf of Mexico. "As musicians who have the benefit of the spotlight from time to time, we feel it is our duty to aid in raising awareness and financial support to help remedy the awful situation in the Gulf Of Mexico. It is so important that each and every one of us do what we can to help those out whose lives have been harshly impacted by the oil spill." – Josh Todd on the BP oil spill.

"All Night Long" appeared in a video package highlighting Wrestlemania XXVII.

The album sold around 28,000 units in its first week of release to land at position No. 10 on The Billboard 200 chart.

== Track listing ==
No.	Title	Writer(s)	Length
1.	"All Night Long"	Josh Todd; Keith Nelson	3:54
2.	"It's a Party"	Todd; Nelson; Marti Frederiksen	3:44
3.	"These Things"	Todd; Nelson; Jimmy Ashhurst	3:52
4.	"Oh My Lord"	Todd; Nelson	3:38
5.	"Recovery"	Todd; Nelson; Stevie D.	3:01
6.	"Never Say Never"	Todd; Nelson; Frederiksen	3:43
7.	"I Want You"	Todd; Nelson; Frederiksen	3:43
8.	"Liberty"	Todd; Nelson; Ashhurst	4:16
9.	"Our World"	Todd; Nelson; Frederiksen; Ashhurst	3:50
10.	"Bliss"	Todd; Nelson; Frederiksen	3:56
11.	"Dead"	Todd; Nelson	5:24
12.	"Lonely" (Japan bonus track)	Todd; Nelson	3:14

Reckless Sons Acoustic EP (deluxe version only)
No.	Title	Length
12.	"These Things" (acoustic)	3:58
13.	"Fire Off Your Guns"	3:46
14.	"Black Butterfly"	3:47
15.	"King of Kings"	4:49
16.	"My Friend"	3:58
17.	"Grace"	4:20

== Personnel ==
- Josh Todd – lead vocals
- Keith Nelson – lead guitar, backing vocals
- Stevie D. – rhythm guitar, backing vocals
- Jimmy "Two Fingers" Ashhurst – bass guitar, backing vocals
- Xavier Muriel – drums, percussion
- Mixed by Mike Fraser
