= Automatic Black =

- Origin: Philadelphia, Pennsylvania, United States
- Genres: Rock, indie, punk
- Years active: 2001–present
- Labels: Arista Records; Nashville NOiR; Per Capita Records
- Members: Jeff Darr; Steve Kitabjian; Mark Biondi
- Past members: Tom Chambers; Stevie D. Rikki Lixx
- Website: Official site

Automatic Black is a rock band from Philadelphia, Pennsylvania.

== History ==
=== 2001-2003 Formation ===
The band formed in 2001 when Vocalist Jeff Darr returned from Europe and met Drummer Tom Chambers and Bassist Steve Kitabjian through mutual friends. Guitarist Stevie D. finalized the lineup after he felt a calling to the band because both the group's members and music had similar feel to his own struggles and hardship.

=== 2003-2004 Minor popularity and De-Evolution ===
In 2003, Automatic Black was the opening act for Kiss and Aerosmith on the second leg of their Rocksimus Maximus Tour.

Their debut album, De-Evolution, intended to be released on April 6, 2004 under Arista Records, was never formally released due to financial difficulties; however, their song "Crash and Burn" was featured in the EA game Tiger Woods PGA Tour 2004 and their song "Go Your Way" was officially released as a single on January 19, 2004.

=== 2005-2007 Lineup changes ===
After not getting their debut album formally on the market and getting released from Arista Records, members Stevie D. and Tom Chambers left the band. Stevie D. reformed the band Buckcherry with long time friend Josh Todd and Tom Chambers left due to differences between him and Jeff Darr.

Rikki Lixx (Richard Thomas) took over on Guitar for Stevie D. With Rikki Lixx they released a few non-album singles on their Myspace such as "What Else"; (However they can no longer be found on their website).

Rikki Lixx left Automatic Black that year to join Rev Theory. He was then replaced by Mark Biondi.

=== 2008-2009 Nashville and Automatic Black EP ===
The group released their self-titled EP in 2008 on independent label Nashville NOiR, and again on September 1, 2009 on independent Nashville record label Per Capita Records.

=== 2010-Present Hiatus ===
The band has been on an unofficial hiatus as of 2011, however in 2013 they released the previously mentioned fan favorite "Crash and Burn" on their Myspace page.

== Discography and Singles ==
April 6, 2004: De-Evolution

1. Dementia
2. Radio Edit
3. Crash and Burn
4. No Brain
5. Antiseptic
6. Low
7. Go Your Way
8. N.T.I.L.
9. Burn Out
10. Lovely Thing
11. Ashtray

September 2008 - September 1, 2009: Automatic Black

1. No Matter What
2. Ruined Everything
3. Bitch Is Dead
4. White Trash Vacation
5. The One

Singles

- Crash and Burn - September 22, 2003, re-released 2013
- Go Your Way - January 19, 2004
- What Else - 2006
- No Matter What - 2009

== Members ==
=== Current members ===
- Jeff Darr - Vocals, Rhythm Guitar (2001–Present), Lead Guitar (2001-2003)
- Steve Kitabjian - Bass, Backing Vocals (2001–Present)
- Mark Biondi - Lead Guitar, Backing Vocals (2006–Present)

=== Past members ===
- Tom Chambers - Drums, Percussion, Backing Vocals (2001-2005)
- Stevie D. - Lead Guitar, Backing Vocals (2003-2005)
- Rikki Lixx - Lead Guitar (2005-2006)

=== Studio Musicians ===
- Dan O'Neill - Bass, Backing Vocals (2003) on De-Evolution
- Dan Showell - Guitar, Backing Vocals (2003) on De-Evolution
