= Fuck (EP) =

EP by Buckcherry
- Released: August 19, 2014
- Recorded: January 2014
- Studio: The Bastard Ranch, Los Angeles
- Genre: Hard rock
- Length: 19:15
- Label: F-Bomb
- Producer: Keith Nelson

Buckcherry chronology
Confessions (2013)	Fuck (2014)	Rock 'n' Roll (2015)

Fuck is an extended play album by American hard rock band Buckcherry, released on August 19, 2014, on F-Bomb Records. Every song on the EP has the word "Fuck" in their titles, except for the bonus track, a cover of the Aerosmith song "Mama Kin". The song "Say Fuck It" is a cover of the Icona Pop song "I Love It" with modified lyrics. It is their first release with Kelly LeMieux on bass guitar.

== Track listing ==
No.	Title	Writer(s)	Length
1.	"Somebody Fucked with Me"		3:43
2.	"Say Fuck It" (Icona Pop cover with modified title and lyrics)	Charlotte Aitchison; Patrik Berger; Buckcherry	2:55
3.	"The Motherfucker"		3:08
4.	"I Don't Give a Fuck"		3:19
5.	"It's a Fucking Disaster"		4:52
6.	"Fist Fuck"		2:22
7.	"Mama Kin" (Best Buy bonus track)	Steven Tyler	4:32
Total length:			19:15

== Personnel ==
Buckcherry

- Josh Todd – vocals
- Keith Nelson – guitars
- Stevie D – guitars
- Xavier Muriel – drums
- Kelly LeMieux – bass

== Charts ==
Chart (2014)	Peak position
US Billboard 200	38
US Independent Albums (Billboard)	6
US Top Alternative Albums (Billboard)	8
US Top Hard Rock Albums (Billboard)	5
US Top Rock Albums (Billboard)	13
