= Sorry (Buckcherry song) =

2007 single by Buckcherry

Single by Buckcherry

from the album 15
- Released: November 9, 2007
- Length: 3:46
- Label: Eleven Seven; Atlantic
- Songwriter(s): Josh Todd; Keith Nelson; Marti Frederiksen
- Producer(s): Mike Plotnikoff; Paul DeCarli; Keith Nelson

Buckcherry singles chronology
"Broken Glass" (2007)	"Sorry" (2007)	"Too Drunk..." (2008)

Audio sample
- file; help

"Sorry" is a song by American rock band Buckcherry. It is their fifth and final single from their third album, 15. Initially, "Sorry" was not planned to be a single, but after increasing popularity on mainstream radio, the band made a video and officially released the song in November 2007.

== Chart performance ==
"Sorry" was highly successful on mainstream radio and in digital sales, reaching the top 10 on the Billboard Hot 100 at number nine and ranked number 44 on the Billboard Year-End chart of 2008, becoming only the second song of the band's career to chart on the Hot 100, and besting the number 59 peak of their first Hot 100 charter "Crazy Bitch".

"Sorry" is Buckcherry's only Hot 100 top 10 hit as well as their only top 10 hit on the Pop 100 as well, reaching number eight. It also reached number two on the Adult Top 40, becoming the first Buckcherry single to register on that chart.

"Sorry" is the second Buckcherry song to enter the Canadian Hot 100 chart, where it debuted at number 97 and climbed to number seven, their first top 10 single there. "Sorry" debuted on Mainstream Rock Tracks at number 39 and climbed to number 32, and on Modern Rock Tracks at number 37, where it climbed to number 31. It is Buckcherry's first song to reach the adult contemporary charts, peaking at number 26.

== Charts ==
=== Weekly charts ===
Chart (2008)	Peak position
Canada (Canadian Hot 100)	7
Canada CHR/Top 40 (Billboard)	10
Canada Hot AC (Billboard)	1
Canada Rock (Billboard)	12
France Radio (SNEP)	84
New Zealand (Recorded Music NZ)	15
US Billboard Hot 100	9
US Adult Contemporary (Billboard)	26
US Adult Pop Airplay (Billboard)	2
US Alternative Airplay (Billboard)	31
US Mainstream Rock (Billboard)	32
US Pop Airplay (Billboard)	5

=== Year-end charts ===
Chart (2008)	Position
Canada (Canadian Hot 100)	45
Canada Hot AC (Billboard)	6
US Billboard Hot 100	44
US Adult Top 40 (Billboard)	5
US Mainstream Top 40 (Billboard)	20

== Certifications ==
Region	Certification	Certified units/sales
United States (RIAA)	2× Platinum	2,000,000^{‡}
^{‡} Sales+streaming figures based on certification alone.
