= Warpaint (Buckcherry album) =

Studio album by Buckcherry
- Released: March 8, 2019
- Studio: West Valley Recording Studios; (Los Angeles, California)
- Genre: Hard rock
- Length: 43:34
- Label: Century Media
- Producer: Mike Plotnikoff

Buckcherry chronology
Rock 'n' Roll (2015)	Warpaint (2019)	Hellbound (2021)

Singles from Warpaint
- 1. "Head Like a Hole" Released: November 2, 2018; 2. "Bent" Released: January 10, 2019; 3. "Warpaint" Released: February 8, 2019; 4. "Right Now" Released: June 18, 2019

Professional ratings
Review scores
Source	Rating
AllMusic	3/5 stars

Warpaint is the eighth studio album by American hard rock band Buckcherry, released on March 8, 2019, by Century Media Records. It is their only album to feature guitarist Kevin Roentgen and drummer Sean Winchester.

== Track listing ==
No.	Title	Length
1.	"Warpaint"	3:52
2.	"Right Now"	3:38
3.	"Head Like a Hole" (Nine Inch Nails cover)	3:53
4.	"Radio Song"	4:33
5.	"The Vacuum"	3:50
6.	"Bent"	3:29
7.	"Backdown"	3:43
8.	"The Alarm"	3:14
9.	"No Regrets"	2:59
10.	"The Hunger"	3:33
11.	"Closer"	3:39
12.	"The Devil's in the Details"	3:11
13.	"Jungle Love * (Morris Day/Prince)"	3:25
14.	"Burn Rate *"	2:55
15.	"Kamikaze *"	2:56
Total length:		43:34

- * Japanese bonus tracks

== Personnel ==
- Josh Todd – vocals
- Stevie D – guitars, backing vocals
- Kelly LeMieux – bass, backing vocals
- Kevin Roentgen – guitars, backing vocals
- Sean Winchester – drums

Additional musicians

- Igor Khoroshev – orchestration, strings

Recording personnel

- Johnny Andrews – composer
- Stevie Dacanay – composer
- Hatsukazu "Hatch" Inagaki – engineering, mixing
- Howie Weinberg – mastering
- Mike Plotkinoff – mixing, producing
- Trent Reznor – composer

Additional personnel

- Aaron Marsh – art direction, layout design
- Amy Mazer – assistant
- Jeremy Staffer – photography

== Charts ==
Chart (2019)	Peak position
Scottish Albums (OCC)	45
Swiss Albums (Schweizer Hitparade)	99
