= Maggie (1981 American TV series) =

- Genre: Sitcom
- Created by: Erma Bombeck
- Starring: Miriam Flynn; James Hampton; Doris Roberts; Margie Impert; Judith-Marie Bergan; Billy Jayne; Christian Jacobs
- Composer: Patrick Williams
- Country of origin: United States
- Original language: English
- No. of seasons: 1
- No. of episodes: 8

Production
- Executive producers: Tom Whedon; Erma Bombeck
- Running time: 30 minutes
- Production companies: Erma Bombeck Productions; Marble Arch Productions

Original release
- Network: ABC
- Release: October 24, 1981 – May 21, 1982

Maggie is an American sitcom broadcast on ABC from October 24, 1981, to May 21, 1982.

== Premise ==
Miriam Flynn stars as Maggie Weston, a Dayton, Ohio, housewife. Based on the humorous books of Erma Bombeck, this sitcom portrayed the life of a harried housewife, Maggie Weston, as she coped with her husband and her three children in the suburbs outside of Dayton, Ohio. L.J. was the 16-year-old son of the Westons who was referred to but never seen or heard on the program because he was always in the bathroom. Doris Roberts co-starred as Loretta, Maggie's friend and hairdresser.

== Cast ==
- Miriam Flynn as Maggie Weston
- James Hampton as Len Weston
- Doris Roberts as Loretta Davenport
- Judith-Marie Bergan as Buffy Croft
- Margie Impert as Chris
- Billy Jayne as Mark Weston
- Christian Jacobs as Bruce Weston

== Episodes ==
No.	Title	Directed by	Written by	Original release date
1	"The School Conference"	John Tracy	Erma Bombeck	October 24, 1981
2	"A Tooth for a Tooth"	John Tracy	Bill Davenport & Tom Whedon	October 31, 1981
3	"Career"	John Tracy	Erma Bombeck	November 7, 1981
4	"Bruce's Birthday Party"	John Tracy	Korby Siamis	November 14, 1981
5	"Marriage Encounter"	John Tracy	Erma Bombeck	April 30, 1982
6	"Alienation of Affection"	John Tracy	Erma Bombeck	May 7, 1982
7	"Mark's Shrink"	John Tracy	Karyl Miller	May 14, 1982
8	"Maggie the Poet"	John Tracy	Erma Bombeck	May 21, 1982
