= Spencer's Pilots =

- Genre: Adventure
- Created by: Larry Rosen
- Starring: Gene Evans; Christopher Stone; Todd Susman; Britt Leach; Margie Impert
- Theme music composer: Morton Stevens
- Composers: Morton Stevens Bruce Broughton Jerrold Immel Dick DeBenedictis Harry Geller
- Country of origin: United States
- Original language: English
- No. of seasons: 1
- No. of episodes: 8 (list of episodes)

Production
- Executive producers: Bob Sweeney; Edward H. Feldman
- Producer: Larry Rosen
- Camera setup: Single-camera
- Running time: 48 minutes

Original release
- Network: CBS
- Release: September 17 – November 19, 1976

Spencer's Pilots is an American adventure series that aired on CBS from September 17 to November 19, 1976. Created by Larry Rosen and developed by Alvin Sapinsley, the series stars Gene Evans.

== Episodes ==
| No. | Title | Directed by | Written by | Original release date | Prod. code |
|---|---|---|---|---|---|
| 0 | "Spencer's Pilots" | Unknown | Unknown | April 9, 1976 | 1310-5876-2448 |
| 1 | "The Drone" | Unknown | Unknown | September 17, 1976 | 1310-2817-0108 |
| 2 | "The Prisoner" | Unknown | Unknown | September 24, 1976 | 1310-2817-0107 |
| 3 | "The Matchbook" | Unknown | Unknown | October 1, 1976 | 1310-2817-0115 |
| 4 | "The Crop Duster" | Don Weis | Karl & Terence Tunberg | October 8, 1976 | 1310-2817-0111 |
| 5 | "The Search" | Bruce Bilson | William Froug | October 29, 1976 | 1310-2817-0117 |
| 6 | "The Hunted" | Unknown | Unknown | November 5, 1976 | 1310-2817-0114 |
| 7 | "The Code" | Bruce Bilson | Larry Rosen | November 12, 1976 | 1310-2817-0109 |
| 8 | "The Explosives" | Unknown | Unknown | November 19, 1976 | 1310-2817-0105 |
