= Year of the Tiger (Josh Todd and the Conflict album) =

Studio album by Josh Todd and the Conflict
- Released: September 15, 2017
- Recorded: 2017
- Genre: Hard rock
- Length: 36:00
- Label: Century Media Records
- Producer: Eric Kretz, Stevie D.

Year of the Tiger is the debut studio album by American hard rock band Josh Todd and the Conflict, released on September 15, 2017, by Century Media Records.

== Track listing ==
No.	Title	Writer(s)	Length
1.	"Year of the Tiger"	Josh Todd, Stevie D.	2:33
2.	"Inside"	Josh Todd, Stevie D.	3:04
3.	"Fucked Up"	Josh Todd, Stevie D.	3:41
4.	"Rain" (Explicit version)	Josh Todd, Stevie D.	3:46
5.	"Good Enough"	Josh Todd, Stevie D.	4:14
6.	"The Conflict"	Josh Todd, Stevie D.	2:32
7.	"Story of my Life"	Josh Todd, Stevie D.	2:56
8.	"Erotic City" (Prince cover)	Prince	3:42
9.	"Push It"	Josh Todd, Stevie D.	3:16
10.	"Atomic"	Josh Todd, Stevie D.	2:53
11.	"Rain" (Clean version)	Josh Todd, Stevie D.	3:46
Total length:			36:07

== Personnel ==
- Josh Todd – lead vocals
- Stevie D. – guitar, backing vocals
- Gregg Cash - Bass guitar
- Sean Winchester – drums
