= Roar Like Thunder =

Studio album by Buckcherry
- Released: June 13, 2025
- Genre: Rock
- Length: 31:33
- Label: Round Hill (North America); Sony (Japan); Earache (global)
- Producer: Marti Frederiksen

Buckcherry chronology
Vol. 10 (2023)	Roar Like Thunder (2025)

Singles from Roar Like Thunder
- 1. "Roar Like Thunder" Released: March 18, 2025; 2. "Come On" Released: April 15, 2025; 3. "Set It Free" Released: May 13, 2025

Roar Like Thunder is the eleventh studio album by American hard rock band Buckcherry. It was released on June 13, 2025, via Round Hill Records in North America, Sony Music in Japan and Earache Records elsewhere globally, in LP, CD and digital formats.

== Background ==
Consisting of tracks ranging between two and four minutes each, with a total runtime of approximately thirty-one minutes, Roar Like Thunder was produced by Marti Frederiksen, who recorded it at a studio in Nashville in November 2024. It was noted as a rock album.

The title track and first single was released on March 18, 2025, alongside a music video directed by Tom Flynn. The album's second single, "Come On", was released on April 15, 2025. "Set It Free" was released as the third single on May 13, 2025.

== Reception ==
Professional ratings
Review scores
Source	Rating
Blabbermouth	8/10 stars
Classic Rock	4/5 stars
Kerrang!	2/5 stars

Writing for Classic Rock, Chris Lord noted that "Buckcherry are certainly showing no signs of decline, and Roar Like Thunder is as rollickingly focused as they've ever sounded," giving it a four-star rating.

Blabbermouth assigned the album a rating of eight out of ten, describing it as "full of songs with real character and a clear desire to lift spirits" and noting it "wipes the floor with most of the competition."

Steve Beebee of Kerrang! stated, "Taken for what it is, a retro-flavoured sleaze rock album, Roar Like Thunder hits the mark. But it's an echo from an era in rock that ain't ever coming back," giving it a rating of two out of five.

== Track listing ==
All tracks are written by Stevie Dacanay, Josh Todd, and Marti Frederiksen.

No.	Title	Length
1.	"Roar Like Thunder"	3:07
2.	"When the Sun Goes Down"	2:16
3.	"Come On"	3:27
4.	"Talking Bout Sex"	2:48
5.	"Blackout"	3:32
6.	"I Go Boom"	2:54
7.	"Set It Free"	3:29
8.	"Hello Goodbye"	4:04
9.	"Machine Gun"	3:11
10.	"Let It Burn"	2:45
Total length:		31:33

== Personnel ==
Credits adapted from Tidal.

Buckcherry

- Josh Todd – lead vocals
- Stevie Dacanay – electric guitar, background vocals
- Kelly LeMieux – electric bass, background vocals
- Francis Ruiz – drums
- Billy Rowe – slide guitar, background vocals

Technical

- Marti Frederiksen – production
- Evan Frederiksen – mixing, engineering
- Anthony Focx – mastering
