= 15 (Buckcherry album) =

Studio album by Buckcherry
- Released: October 17, 2005
- Recorded: 2005
- Studio: Mad Dog Studios Burbank, California; Studio Atlantis Los Angeles, California
- Genre: Hard rock
- Length: 42:28
- Label: Universal Japan; Eleven Seven; Atlantic
- Producer: Mike Plotnikoff; Paul DeCarli; Keith Nelson

Buckcherry chronology
Time Bomb (2001)	15 (2005)	Black Butterfly (2008)

Singles from 15
- 1. "Crazy Bitch" Released: January 31, 2006; 2. "Next 2 You" Released: 2006; 3. "Everything" Released: January 23, 2007; 4. "Broken Glass" Released: 2007; 5. "Sorry" Released: September 2007

Professional ratings
Review scores
Source	Rating
AllMusic	4/5 stars
Ultimate Guitar	9/10 stars
IGN	(8.6/10)
Rolling Stone	3/5 stars
Sleaze Roxx	4/5 stars

15 is the third studio album by American rock band Buckcherry. It was released in Japan on October 17, 2005, through Universal Japan and on April 6, 2006, in North America, through Eleven Seven Music, as the label's first release. It features a new line-up. "Crazy Bitch" was the first single off the album and enjoyed success on the pop charts. The second single was "Next 2 You" which peaked at No. 18 on the Hot Mainstream Rock Tracks chart.

The band confirmed, via Myspace, that the album has been certified Platinum by the RIAA for sales of 1,000,000 copies surpassing their debut album and since then it has been certified double platinum. The fifth and last single, "Sorry", has become their highest charting single to date on the US Hot 100. After 98 weeks on the Billboard 200, the album became the first Buckcherry album to reach the top 40, peaking at 39. "Pump it Up", a Japanese edition bonus track, is used by the NHL's Edmonton Oilers as their introduction song.

== Title ==
The name of the album comes from the number of days it took the band to record it.

== Track listing ==
No.	Title	Writer(s)	Length
1.	"So Far"	Josh Todd; Keith Nelson	3:19
2.	"Next 2 You"	Todd; Nelson; Jimmy Ashhurst; Marti Frederiksen	3:28
3.	"Out of Line"	Todd; Nelson; Ashhurst; Stevie Dacanay	4:22
4.	"Everything"	Todd; Nelson; Ashhurst	4:23
5.	"Carousel"	Todd; Ashhurst	4:31
6.	"Sorry"	Todd; Nelson; Frederiksen	3:46
7.	"Crazy Bitch"	Todd; Nelson	3:22
8.	"Onset"	Todd; Nelson; Dacanay	3:35
9.	"Sunshine"	Todd; Nelson; Ashhurst	4:12
10.	"Brooklyn"	Todd; Nelson; Ashhurst; Dacanay	3:59
11.	"Broken Glass"	Todd; Nelson; Dacanay	3:31
Total length:			42:28

Japanese only bonus tracks
No.	Title	Writer(s)	Length
12.	"Back in the Day"		2:55
13.	"Pump It Up"	Elvis Costello	3:03

Edited version
No.	Title	Length
1.	"Onset"	3:35
2.	"Next 2 You"	3:28
3.	"Out of Line"	4:22
4.	"Everything"	4:23
5.	"Carousel"	4:31
6.	"Sorry"	3:46
7.	"Crazy Bitch"	3:22
8.	"Sunshine"	4:12
9.	"Back in the Day" (replacing "So Far")	2:55
10.	"Brooklyn"	3:59
11.	"Broken Glass"	3:31

iTunes version
No.	Title	Length
12.	"Sorry" (acoustic)	3:43
13.	"Brooklyn" (electric)	3:52

== Personnel ==
Buckcherry

- Josh Todd – lead vocals
- Keith Nelson – lead guitar
- Jimmy Ashhurst – bass guitar
- Stevie Dacanay – rhythm guitar
- Xavier Muriel – drums

Additional musicians

- Mark Watrous – keyboards
- Jim Cox – string arrangements

Production

- Paul DeCarli – producer
- Mike Plotnikoff – producer, engineer, mixing
- Ted Jensen – mastering
- Bruce Sugar – engineer
- Chris Henry – assistant engineer

== Charts ==
=== Weekly charts ===
Weekly chart performance for 15
Chart (2006–2008)	Peak position
Japanese Albums (Oricon)	20
US Billboard 200	39
US Independent Albums (Billboard)	2
US Top Rock Albums (Billboard)	8

=== Year-end charts ===
2007 year-end chart performance for 15
Chart (2007)	Position
US Billboard 200	131

2008 year-end chart performance for 15
Chart (2008)	Position
US Billboard 200	96
US Top Hard Rock Albums (Billboard)	12

== Certifications ==
Certifications for 15
Region	Certification	Certified units/sales
Canada (Music Canada)	Platinum	100,000^{^}
United States (RIAA)	2× Platinum	2,000,000^{‡}
^{^} Shipments figures based on certification alone.^{‡} Sales+streaming figures based on certification alone.
