= Black Butterfly (Buckcherry album) =

Studio album by Buckcherry
- Released: September 16, 2008
- Recorded: Late 2007 – early 2008
- Studio: Drive-By Studios; Studio 606; Northridge, California
- Genre: Hard rock
- Length: 42:23
- Label: Eleven Seven; Atlantic
- Producer: Marti Frederiksen; Buckcherry

Buckcherry chronology
| 15 (2006) | Black Butterfly (2008) | Live & Loud 2009 (2009) |

Singles from Black Butterfly
- 1. "Too Drunk..." Released: July 2008; 2. "Don't Go Away" Released: 2008; 3. "Rescue Me" Released: 2008; 4. "Talk to Me" Released: September 20, 2009

Professional ratings
Aggregate scores
| Source | Rating |
|---|---|
| Metacritic | (50/100) |
Review scores
| Source | Rating |
| AllMusic | 1.5/5 stars |
| Blender | 2.5/5 stars |
| Entertainment Weekly | B− |
| IGN | (7.1/10) |
| Los Angeles Times | 2/4 stars |
| Rolling Stone | 3/5 stars |
| Spin | (7/10) |
| Ultimate Guitar | (7.7/10) |

Black Butterfly is the fourth studio album by American hard rock band Buckcherry. The album was released on September 12, 2008, in Japan, Canada, and the United Kingdom while being released on September 16 in the United States. It had been in production since late 2007. The limited fan edition was included with two demo songs, "Nothing" and "Stayin' High". Along with the bonus songs, the case came with a year free membership to the Buckcherry Fan Club, "Buckcherry's Bomb Squad". Black Butterfly debuted at number eight on the Billboard 200, making it the band's highest-charting album in the United States.

== Singles ==
The songs "Rescue Me" and "Don't Go Away" were eventually placed on the band's MySpace page. "Rescue Me" was released for download in the video game series Rock Band. "Don't Go Away" was selected as the second single to be released from the album.

== Composition ==
Vocalist Josh Todd has mentioned that the songs "Rescue Me" and "A Child Called 'It'" were both inspired by the Dave Pelzer book, A Child Called "It". "There were times when I had to put the book down because the abuse of this boy was so bad, but I felt like the book found me… I was compelled to write this song out of inspiration from this guy's incredible journey."

"Rescue Me" was used as the official theme song for the WWE Judgment Day 2009 pay-per view.

== Track listing ==
| No. | Title | Writer(s) | Length |
|---|---|---|---|
| 1. | "Rescue Me" | Josh Todd; Keith Nelson; James Ashhurst; Steve Dacanay | 3:12 |
| 2. | "Tired of You" | Todd; Nelson; Marti Frederiksen; Dacanay | 3:07 |
| 3. | "Too Drunk..." (replaced with a cover of "Highway Star" in the re-released version/"clean" version (originally featured on the 1972 album Machine Head by the British rock band Deep Purple. This song also does not feature on the Spotify version.) | Todd; Nelson; Dacanay | 4:02 |
| 4. | "Dreams" | Todd; Nelson; Ashhurst | 3:51 |
| 5. | "Talk to Me" | Todd; Nelson; Frederiksen | 3:28 |
| 6. | "A Child Called 'It'" | Todd; Nelson | 2:55 |
| 7. | "Don't Go Away" | Todd; Nelson; Frederiksen | 3:49 |
| 8. | "Fallout" | Todd; Nelson | 3:36 |
| 9. | "Rose" | Todd; Nelson; Frederiksen | 3:53 |
| 10. | "All of Me" | Todd; Nelson | 3:45 |
| 11. | "Imminent Bail Out" | Todd; Nelson | 3:11 |
| 12. | "Cream" | Todd; Nelson; Ashhurst | 3:34 |
| Total length: | | | 42:23 |

Limited fan club edition
| No. | Title | Length |
|---|---|---|
| 13. | "Nothing" (demo) | 3:30 |
| 14. | "Stayin' High" (demo) | 4:01 |

== Personnel ==
Buckcherry

- Josh Todd – lead vocals
- Keith Nelson – lead guitar
- Jimmy Ashhurst – bass guitar
- Stevie Dacanay – rhythm guitar
- Xavier Muriel – drums

== Certifications ==
| Region | Certification | Certified units/sales |
|---|---|---|
| Canada (Music Canada) | Gold | 40,000^{^} |
^{^} Shipments figures based on certification alone.

== Chart positions ==
| Chart (2008) | Peak position |
|---|---|
| U.S. Billboard 200 | 8 |
| U.S. Billboard Top Rock Albums | 3 |
| Canadian Albums Chart | 6 |
