= Crazy Bitch =

Single by Buckcherry

from the album 15
- Released: 2006
- Recorded: 2005
- Genre: Hard rock
- Length: 3:22
- Label: Eleven Seven; Atlantic
- Songwriters: Josh Todd; Keith Nelson
- Producers: Mike Plotnikoff; Paul DeCarli; Keith Nelson

Buckcherry singles chronology
"Ridin'" (2001)	"Crazy Bitch" (2006)	"Next 2 You" (2006)

"Crazy Bitch" is a song by American hard rock band Buckcherry. It was released in 2006 as the lead single to the band's third studio album, 15. The song was inspired by Paris Hilton's 2004 sex tape 1 Night in Paris.

It was the band's first single to hit the Billboard Hot 100 chart, debuting at No. 99 and peaking at No. 59. It earned a nomination for Best Hard Rock Performance at the 49th Annual Grammy Awards.

== Background ==
Singer Josh Todd said the song was inspired by the 2004 Paris Hilton sex tape. He added, "That kind of sparked the idea. All the guys that we know have had crazy girls like that in their lives, so we wanted to write a song with an idea that people could latch on to." Guitarist Keith Nelson admitted that they didn't plan on "Crazy Bitch" being their first single, as evidenced by the amount of profanity which made the song very radio-unfriendly. However, satellite radio stations could play the song uncensored, and a few in New York City put the song on heavy rotation, garnering exposure.

Todd said that he first recorded himself singing the song's chorus on his mother's answering machine.

Guitarist Keith Nelson disagreed with the song's reputation as misogynist. He said, "It was never meant to be misogynistic, but that was the way a lot of people saw it when the album came out. But since then I’ve heard that so many women love it, and know all the lyrics. Something like that is really gratifying, because it means that females are in on the joke as well. So anyone out there who still thinks we’re sexist? Talk to the girls who go around calling themselves The Crazy Bitch."

In 2014, Buckcherry launched a line of sex toys named "Crazy Bitch Toys" after the song. Its first two products were the "All Night Long Pleasure Cock" and "The Truth Tattoo Care Kit".

== Music videos ==
The original music video was filmed at the Key Club in Los Angeles, which was made to look like a strip club. An open casting call (documented in a video on the band's site called "Behind the Bitch") was held in October 2005, recruiting unpaid dancers and strippers for the low-budget video, which was directed by Ulf Buddensieck. There are two versions of the video: an "explicit" version featuring female nudity (which was made available on the band's website) and a "clean" version that was aired on Fuse TV. The "clean" version, however, was not approved by MTV, who demanded more than 80 cuts, according to the July 13, 2006, issue of Rolling Stone.

In October 2006, a new concept video was created for "Crazy Bitch" and the band's then-single "Next 2 You".

=== Controversy ===
On September 11, 2006, a lawsuit was filed that alleges that a minor was given alcohol to drink and allegedly was filmed exposing her breasts, kissing another female and writhing against a pole while Buckcherry performed the song at the video shoot, which was later to be proven false. According to the lawsuit, the music video was posted on the band's website and distributed widely online, as was a "behind the scenes" program that referred to the girl's first name, featured more nudity and had band members saying, "It's like watching seven hours of porn." Skip Miller of law firm Miller Barondess said, "We had a guy at the door checking IDs, and to get in, this girl had to show a fake identification showing she was over 18. There were signs telling minors to stay out. This woman filled out a release form with false information. And once it was determined this woman was underage, the video was removed." However, the lawsuit alleges that the minor was not asked for identification. Allen Kovac, Buckcherry's manager, said, "There was every opportunity for her not to be in that video. For whatever reason, the girl subverted those efforts, and now her mom is trying to blame everyone but her. This woman is now looking at them as a profit opportunity." A representative of Warner Music Group said it had no role in the video's original production, but that when the music company was contacted by the girl's mother, it immediately re-edited the video to exclude her and removed the original from circulation, hiring an outside group to strip it from websites that had posted it illegally.

== Reception ==
"Crazy Bitch" has received mixed reception. In 2013, Angelica Leicht of Houston Press said the track was the "Worst. Song. Ever." Sam Goblin of Talkhouse called the track "one of the most abhorrent songs ever put to tape." By contrast, Metal Injection referred to it as one of the "greatest divorced dad rock songs of all time," and wrote: "If Nickelback somehow doesn’t get your mistress in the mood, you’ve got a surefire backup with Buckcherry. Josh Todd is the man!"

== Charts ==
=== Weekly charts ===
Weekly chart performance for "Crazy Bitch"
Chart (2006)	Peak position
Canada Rock (Billboard)	30
US Billboard Hot 100	59
US Alternative Airplay (Billboard)	13
US Mainstream Rock Airplay (Billboard)	3

=== Year-end charts ===
Year-end chart performance for "Crazy Bitch"
Chart (2006)	Position
US Mainstream Rock Songs (Billboard)	6

== Certifications ==
Certifications for "Crazy Bitch"
Region	Certification	Certified units/sales
New Zealand (RMNZ)	Gold	15,000^{‡}
United States (RIAA)	4× Platinum	4,000,000^{‡}
^{‡} Sales+streaming figures based on certification alone.
