= Rock 'n' Roll (Buckcherry album) =

Studio album by Buckcherry
- Released: August 21, 2015
- Recorded: 2014–2015
- Studio: The Bastard Ranch; (Los Angeles, California)
- Genre: Hard rock
- Length: 36:07
- Label: F-Bomb; Century Media
- Producer: Keith Nelson

Buckcherry chronology
Fuck (2014)	Rock 'n' Roll (2015)	Warpaint (2019)

Rock 'n' Roll is the seventh studio album by American hard rock band Buckcherry, released on August 21, 2015 by F-Bomb Records and Century Media Records. It is the band's first album with bassist Kelly LeMieux and their last album with guitarist Keith Nelson and drummer Xavier Muriel before they both left Buckcherry in 2017, due to disagreements with vocalist Josh Todd over the band's direction.

Clocking in at 36 minutes, Rock 'n' Roll is Buckcherry’s shortest album.

== Track listing ==
No.	Title	Writer(s)	Length
1.	"Bring It On Back"	Josh Todd; Keith Nelson	3:30
2.	"Tight Pants"	Todd; Nelson; Stevie Dacanay	3:18
3.	"Wish to Carry On"	Todd; Nelson	3:23
4.	"The Feeling Never Dies"	Todd; Nelson	3:57
5.	"Cradle"	Todd; Nelson	3:44
6.	"The Madness"	Todd; Nelson	4:06
7.	"Wood"	Todd; Nelson	3:09
8.	"Rain's Falling"	Todd; Nelson	4:42
9.	"Sex Appeal"	Todd; Nelson	3:24
10.	"Get with It"	Todd; Nelson; Dacanay	2:53
Total length:			36:07

Japanese edition bonus tracks
No.	Title	Writer(s)	Length
11.	"I've Done Everything for You" (Sammy Hagar cover)	Sammy Hagar	3:18
12.	"Mama Kin" (Aerosmith cover)	Steven Tyler	4:30
Total length:			43:58

Best Buy edition bonus tracks
No.	Title	Writer(s)	Length
11.	"Cannonball"		3:14
12.	"I've Done Everything for You" (Sammy Hagar cover)	Sammy Hagar	3:17
Total length:			42:38

Deluxe edition
No.	Title	Length
11.	"The Feeling Never Dies" (featuring Gretchen Wilson)	3:53
12.	"Gettin' Started" (new song)	4:23
13.	"Cannonball" (B-side)	3:13
Total length:		47:34

== Personnel ==
Professional ratings
Aggregate scores
Source	Rating
Metacritic	67/100
Review scores
Source	Rating
AllMusic	3.5/5 stars
Classic Rock Magazine	7/10
Drowned in Sound	6/10
Kerrang!	3/5 stars

Buckcherry

- Josh Todd – vocals
- Keith Nelson – guitars
- Stevie D – guitars
- Xavier Muriel – drums
- Kelly LeMieux – bass

Additional musicians

- Wally Minko – keyboards on "Rain's Falling" and "The Feeling Never Dies", horn arrangement on "Tight Pants"
- Dan Fornero – trumpet on "Tight Pants"
- Tom Evans – saxophone on "Tight Pants"
- Fred Simmons – trombone on "Tight Pants"

Recording personnel

- Keith Nelson – production
- Jun Murakawa – recording
- Joe Barresi – mixing
- Dave Collins – mastering

Additional personnel

- Cyclical – art direction, packaging
- Strati Hovartos – photography
- Stevie D – photography

== Charts ==
Chart (2015)	Peak position
US Billboard 200	93
US Independent Albums (Billboard)	6
US Top Alternative Albums (Billboard)	9
US Top Hard Rock Albums (Billboard)	10
US Top Rock Albums (Billboard)	17
