= Everything (Buckcherry song) =

Single by Buckcherry

from the album 15
- Released: January 23, 2007
- Recorded: 2005
- Genre: Hard rock
- Length: 4:25
- Label: Eleven Seven; Atlantic
- Songwriters: Josh Todd; Keith Nelson
- Producers: Mike Plotnikoff; Paul DeCarli; Keith Nelson

Buckcherry singles chronology
"Next 2 You" (2006)	"Everything" (2007)	"Broken Glass" (2007)

"Everything" is the eighth single by American rock band Buckcherry, and third from their third album, 15. The song is about a relationship that isn't working out as well as the two partners would want it to be, and they say if they had "everything", their drug problems may be solved. The song has received many plays on radio stations across Canada and the United States.

== Chart performance ==
"Everything" was a moderate chart success, reaching No. 6 on Mainstream Rock Tracks, No. 23 on Modern Rock Tracks, No. 17 on Bubbling Under Hot 100, and No. 50 on Canadian Hot 100.

== Charts ==
=== Weekly charts ===
Weekly chart performance for "Everything"
Chart (2007)	Peak position
Canada Hot 100 (Billboard)	50
Canada Rock (Billboard)	2
US Bubbling Under Hot 100 (Billboard)	17
US Alternative Airplay (Billboard)	23
US Mainstream Rock (Billboard)	6

=== Year-end charts ===
Year-end chart performance for "Everything"
Chart (2007)	Position
US Mainstream Rock (Billboard)	21
