= Lit Up =

1999 single by Buckcherry

Single by Buckcherry

from the album Buckcherry
- Released: February 27, 1999
- Genre: Hard rock
- Length: 3:34
- Label: DreamWorks
- Songwriters: Josh Todd, Keith Nelson

Buckcherry singles chronology
"Lit Up" (1999)	"For the Movies" (1999)

Music video
- "Lit Up" on YouTube

"Lit Up" is the debut single by American hard rock band Buckcherry, taken from their self-titled debut album. It was the band's first and only number one song on the Billboard Mainstream Rock Tracks chart. Steve Jones from the Sex Pistols played guitar on the song. The riff was taken from the intro riff to the Kiss song "Shock Me".

== Content ==
Singer Josh Todd said, "'Lit Up' is about the first time I did cocaine. I knew a couple of dealers in high school and had a lot of fun with that until it wasn't fun anymore - haha!"

== Awards ==
The song reached number one on the Billboard Mainstream Rock Tracks chart for three weeks and number 33 on the Modern Rock Tracks in mid-1999. It was ranked number 98 on VH1's list of the 100 Greatest Hard Rock Songs in January 2009.

== Music video ==
The music video for the song features the band playing in front of an audience. MTV censored the lines glorifying cocaine.

== See also ==
- List of RPM number-one alternative rock singles
- List of Billboard Mainstream Rock number-one songs of the 1990s
