= Buckcherry (album) =

Studio album by Buckcherry
- Released: April 6, 1999
- Recorded: 1998–1999
- Studio: Arnyard (Toronto); NRG Recordings Studios (Hollywood)
- Genre: Hard rock
- Length: 53:31
- Label: DreamWorks
- Producer: Terry Date; Steve Jones

Buckcherry chronology
Buckcherry (1999)	Time Bomb (2001)

Singles from Buckcherry
- 1. "Lit Up" Released: February 27, 1999; 2. "For the Movies" Released: 1999; 3. "Dead Again" Released: 1999; 4. "Check Your Head" Released: 2000

Buckcherry is the debut album by American rock band Buckcherry. It was released on April 6, 1999, by DreamWorks Records. "Lit Up", "For the Movies", "Dead Again", and "Check Your Head" were released as singles. As of September 2006, the album has sold in excess of 750,000 copies, and was certified Gold by both the RIAA and Canada, It is the band's only album as a four-piece.

== Critical reception ==
Professional ratings
Review scores
Source	Rating
AllMusic	4/5 stars
Robert Christgau	(choice cut)
Entertainment Weekly	B
Los Angeles Daily News	1/4 stars
Rolling Stone	2.5/5 stars

The Los Angeles Daily News labeled the album "pedestrian '80s hard rock that relies on recycled James Gang licks and the short memory of anyone that hears it."

== Track listing ==
All tracks by Buckcherry

1. "Lit Up" – 3:35
2. "Crushed" – 3:40
3. "Dead Again" – 3:24
4. "Check Your Head" – 4:32
5. "Dirty Mind" – 5:00
6. "For the Movies" – 4:34
7. "Lawless and Lulu" – 4:08
8. "Related" – 3:28
9. "Borderline" – 4:26
10. "Get Back" – 3:08
11. "Baby" – 4:27
12. "Drink the Water" – 4:18
13. "Late Nights in Voodoo" (Japan bonus track) – 4:51

=== Disc two ===
Special re-release November 21, 2006, CD

1. "Lit Up" (video)
2. "For the Movies" (video)
3. "Check Your Head" (video)
4. "Dead Again" (video)
5. "Crushed" (live) (video)
6. "Check Your Head" (live) (video)
7. "For the Movies" (alternate version) (video)
8. "Late Nights in Voodoo"
9. "Fastback 69"
10. "Lit Up" (live)

== Personnel ==
- Josh Todd – vocals
- Keith Nelson – guitar
- Jonathan "J.B." Brightman – bass
- Devon Glenn – drums, percussion

=== Additional members ===
- Steve Jones – guitar, backing vocals
- Kim Bullard – keyboards
- Greg Archilla – mixing
- David Bianco – producer, engineer
- Chris Bilheimer – art direction
- Bruce Bouillet – engineer
- Buckcherry – producer
- Jason Corsaro – mixing
- Joseph Cultice – photography
- Terry Date – producer, engineer, mixing
- Steve Durkee – programming, engineer, assistant engineer
- Kristin Hambsch – creative director
- Ted Jensen – mastering
- Steve Mixdorf – assistant engineer
- Scott Olson – programming, engineer
- Cameron Webb – assistant engineer, mixing assistant
- Ulrich Wild – programming, engineer

== Charts ==
=== Weekly charts ===
Chart (1999)	Peak position
US Billboard 200	74
US Top Heatseekers Albums (Billboard)	1

=== Year-end charts ===
Chart (1999)	Position
US Billboard 200	183

== Certifications ==
Region	Certification	Certified units/sales
Canada (Music Canada)	Gold	50,000^{^}
United States (RIAA)	Gold	500,000^{^}
^{^} Shipments figures based on certification alone.
