= Time Bomb (Buckcherry album) =

Studio album by Buckcherry
- Released: March 27, 2001
- Recorded: 2000–2001
- Studios: Metalworks Studios in Toronto; mixing in Vancouver
- Genre: Hard rock
- Length: 45:27
- Label: DreamWorks
- Producer: John Travis

Buckcherry chronology
| Buckcherry (1999) | Time Bomb (2001) | 15 (2006) |

Singles from Time Bomb
- 1. "Ridin'" Released: 2001

Professional ratings
Aggregate scores
| Source | Rating |
|---|---|
| Metacritic | (66/100) |
Review scores
| Source | Rating |
| AllMusic | 2/5 stars |
| Entertainment Weekly | (B) |
| New York | (mixed) |
| Sonicnet | (very favorable) |
| USA Today | 2/4 stars |
| Yahoo! Music UK | 7/10 stars |

Time Bomb is the second studio album by American rock band Buckcherry. It was produced by John Travis and released on March 27, 2001, by DreamWorks Records. It is the band's only album to feature Yogi Lonich on rhythm guitar and is the final album to feature the original lineup, as bassist Jonathan Brightman and drummer Devon Glenn both left the band in August 2001 and January 2002, respectively. It is also Buckcherry's last album before a three-year hiatus, which lasted from 2002 to 2005.

== Release and reception ==
The album spawned two singles, "Ridin'" and "Slit My Wrists". The lyrics are sleazier and more sordid than on the band's first album, suggesting considerable rock n' roll excess within the band at the time. The bonus track (untitled on the sleeve, but officially called "Open My Eyes") suggests an end to this due to a successful relationship.

== Track listing ==
| No. | Title | Writer(s) | Length |
|---|---|---|---|
| 1. | "Frontside" | Josh Todd; Keith Nelson | 3:26 |
| 2. | "Ridin'" | Josh Todd; Keith Nelson | 3:40 |
| 3. | "Time Bomb" | Josh Todd; Keith Nelson | 4:09 |
| 4. | "Porno Star" | Josh Todd; Yogi | 3:20 |
| 5. | "Place in the Sun" | Josh Todd; Keith Nelson; Yogi | 3:07 |
| 6. | "(Segue) Helpless" (listed as "Helpless" in the iTunes store) | Josh Todd; Keith Nelson | 4:50 |
| 7. | "Underneath" | Josh Todd; Jonathan Brightman; Yogi | 2:38 |
| 8. | "Slit My Wrists" (listed as "@*#! My Wrists" on the back cover and in the iTunes store) | Josh Todd; Keith Nelson; Yogi | 4:00 |
| 9. | "Whiskey in the Morning" | Josh Todd; Keith Nelson | 2:29 |
| 10. | "You" | Josh Todd; Keith Nelson | 4:04 |
| 11. | "Slamin'" | Josh Todd; Keith Nelson | 2:58 |
| 12. | "Fall" | Josh Todd; Keith Nelson | 3:13 |
| 13. | "Open My Eyes" (hidden track) | Josh Todd; Keith Nelson | 3:36 |
| Total length: | | | 45:22 |

Japanese edition bonus tracks
| No. | Title | Writer(s) | Length |
|---|---|---|---|
| 13. | "Good Things" | Josh Todd; Keith Nelson | 3:00 |
| 14. | "Open My Eyes" (hidden track) | Josh Todd; Keith Nelson | 3:36 |
| Total length: | | | 48:58 |

Best Buy edition bonus tracks
| No. | Title | Writer(s) | Length |
|---|---|---|---|
| 13. | "Lit Up (live)" (Woodstock 1999) | Josh Todd; Keith Nelson | 5:15 |
| 14. | "Fastback 69 (live)" | Josh Todd; Keith Nelson | 3:48 |
| 15. | "Good Things" | Josh Todd; Keith Nelson | 3:27 |
| 16. | "Open My Eyes" (hidden track) | Josh Todd; Keith Nelson | 3:36 |
| Total length: | | | 57:24 |

== Personnel ==
- Josh Todd – vocals
- Keith Nelson – lead guitar
- Yogi Lonich – rhythm guitar, backing vocals
- Jonathan "J.B." Brightman – bass
- Devon Glenn – drums, percussion

== Cover versions ==
In 2011, grindcore band Anal Cunt covered the song "Whiskey in the Morning" for an EP that has since been deleted from Bandcamp and has been re-uploaded to YouTube. The song was a favorite of Anal Cunt frontman Seth Putnam.
