= Buckcherry =

American hard rock band

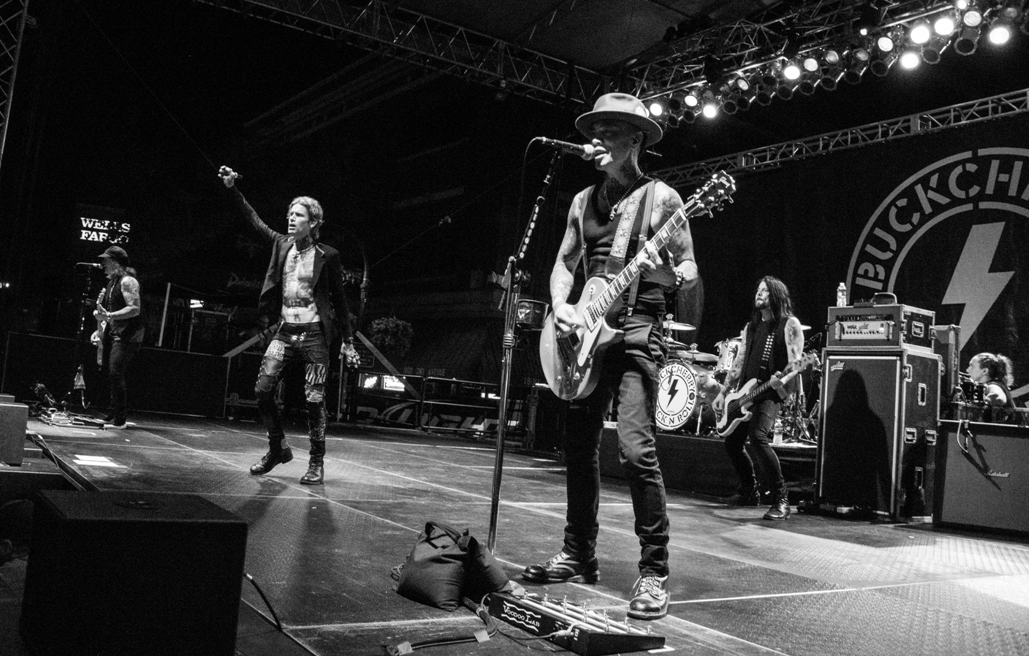
- Buckcherry performing in Rock Island, Illinois in 2016

Background information
- Also known as: Sparrow
- Origin: Anaheim, California, U.S.
- Genres: Hard rock; alternative metal; sleaze rock
- Works: Buckcherry discography
- Years active: 1995–2002; 2005–present
- Labels: Eleven Seven; Atlantic; DreamWorks; Century Media; F-Bomb; Round Hill
- Members: Josh Todd; Stevie D.; Kelly LeMieux; Francis Ruiz; Billy Rowe
- Past members: Keith Nelson; Xavier Muriel; Jonathan Brightman; Devon Glenn; Yogi Lonich; Josh Fleeger; Dave Markasky; Matt Lawrence; Jimmy Ashhurst; Kevin Roentgen; Sean Winchester
- Website: buckcherry.com

Buckcherry is an American hard rock band from Anaheim, California, formed in 1995. The band released two albums, Buckcherry (1999) and Time Bomb (2001), before dissolving in 2002. Buckcherry's first album, Buckcherry, was DreamWorks' first album to go gold. In 2005, lead vocalist Josh Todd and lead guitarist Keith Nelson reformed Buckcherry with a new lineup and released a new album in 2006, 15. It contained Buckcherry's biggest crossover hit to date, "Crazy Bitch", and their first Billboard Hot 100 top ten hit, "Sorry". The band continued to record albums, releasing seven between 2008 and 2023: Black Butterfly in 2008, All Night Long in 2010, Confessions in 2013, Rock 'n' Roll in 2015, Warpaint in 2019, Hellbound in 2021 and Vol. 10 in 2023. Their eleventh album, Roar Like Thunder was released in June 2025.

== History ==
=== 1995–1999: Formation ===
Josh Todd grew up in the Anaheim Hills neighborhood of Anaheim, California and later moved to Lake Forest, California. Early on, Todd fronted the Hollywood glam rock band Slamhound. He eventually met lead guitarist Keith Nelson through their tattoo artist (Kevin Quinn). The duo made a few demos before being joined by bassist Jonathan Brightman and drummer Devon Glenn, calling themselves Sparrow. Sparrow began performing around the Hollywood club scene, receiving a strong, local following due to their old school rock and roll vibe, and were signed to DreamWorks Records shortly after. The group changed its name to Buckcherry after receiving a cease-and-desist letter from a record label called Sparrow (owned by EMI). Although the band's name is a spoonerism of the late Chuck Berry, the group said it was inspired by a drag queen acquaintance of theirs named Buck Cherry.

=== 1999–2002: Breakthrough ===
The band released its self-titled debut in 1999 to critical praise and certified gold sales. The album, produced by Terry Date (Soundgarden/Mother Love Bone/Pantera/Steve Jones/Deftones), included the hit singles "Lit Up", "For the Movies", "Dead Again", and "Check Your Head".

After adding rhythm guitarist Yogi Lonich to the lineup in 1999, Buckcherry toured nonstop in support of the debut album, including opening for Lenny Kravitz on his Freedom Tour (1999) and participating at the infamous Woodstock 99, before going back into the studio in 2000 to work on a follow-up, Time Bomb (2001). The second album was considered a disappointment by many critics, and it did not fare as well on the charts. Allmusic noted that "For a second record, it's surprising how jaded and nihilistic they are already." Buckcherry performed opening dates for AC/DC in the spring of 2000. From August 2001 through January 2002, as tension over the musical direction set in, Jonathan Brightman, Yogi Lonich, and Devon Glenn each successively left Buckcherry, and were replaced by Dave Markasky, Josh Fleeger, and Matt Lawrence, respectively. Josh Todd and Keith Nelson still planned to continue the band, and began the writing process for a third album. The album was never completed, however, and the band was put on hiatus in July 2002.

Josh Todd and Keith Nelson performed together along with ex-Guns N' Roses members Slash, Duff McKagan, and Matt Sorum (also of The Cult) at the Randy Castillo tribute concert. Speculation ensued that Josh Todd would become the lead vocalist of the project headed up by Slash, Duff McKagan, and Matt Sorum. Josh Todd spent a month in the studio, reportedly completing 10 songs, but was abruptly dropped from the project by Slash. Todd was quoted as saying, "It was amazing, the band was slamming, and then Slash just came in one day and just shit-canned the whole thing". In his autobiography, Slash says the reason was because he was displeased with how Todd's voice sounded when they played the material back. Scott Weiland of Stone Temple Pilots was eventually chosen to helm the band that would become known as Velvet Revolver. Keith Nelson was given a songwriting credit on Velvet Revolver's track "Dirty Little Thing". Nelson then went on to write and produce on various records.

=== 2005–2009: Commercial success, 15, and Crüe Fest ===
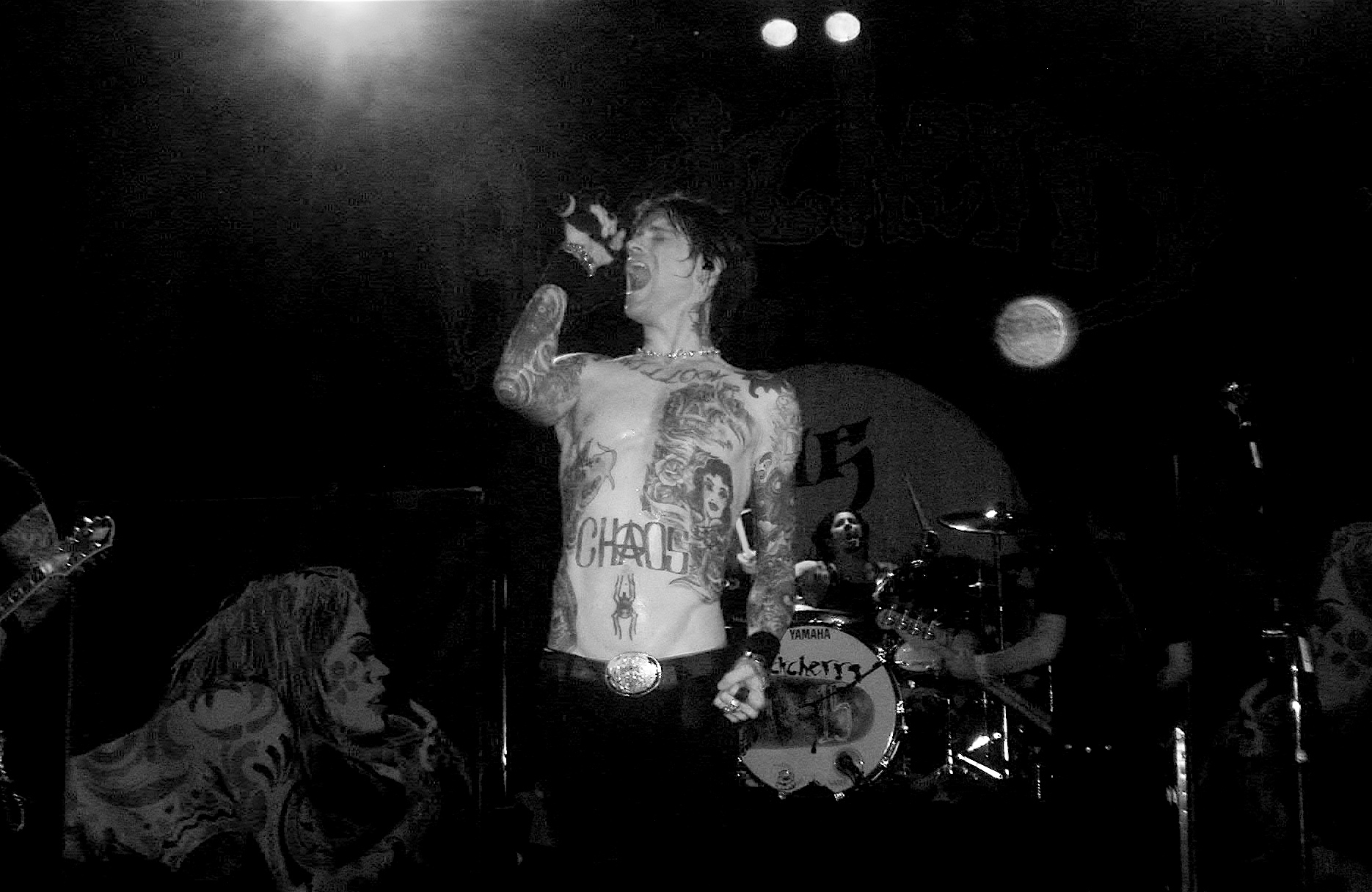
Buckcherry at the Sunshine Theater in 2007

In 2005, Josh Todd reformed Buckcherry with Keith Nelson and new members Stevie D. of Automatic Black, Jimmy Ashhurst, and Xavier Muriel. In 2006, the band released the album 15 to commercial and critical success. It resurrected the band with hits "Crazy Bitch", "Sorry", "Everything" and "Next 2 You".

Back on September 11, 2006, another lawsuit had been filed against the band, their current record label, and other related companies on behalf of a sixteen-year-old girl who claimed she was coerced into appearing topless and in various sexual scenarios at a concert while the band was playing a sexually related song. According to sources, however, all participants in the Crazy Bitch video had to show proof that they were over eighteen years old and sign a release form further reaffirming their age. Band attorney Skip Miller is quoted in several news stories as stating, "This woman filled out a release form with false information. And once it was determined this woman was underage, the video was removed."

On April 15, 2008, Buckcherry announced they would be touring as part of Mötley Crüe's Crüe Fest, along with Papa Roach, Sixx:A.M., and Trapt. The tour began July 1, 2008, in West Palm Beach, Florida.

On September 16, 2008, the band released their fourth album, Black Butterfly, which debuted at number 8 on the top 200 charts. It was the number one rock album that week. That year, Josh Todd was featured on the album This War Is Ours by Escape the Fate. He sang co-lead vocals in the song "10 Miles Wide" and backing vocals on "Harder Than You Know". In 2009, he was featured in the music video for "10 Miles Wide".

In May 2009, Kiss announced that Buckcherry would be the opening band in their 2009/10 US and Canadian tour. On July 30, Buckcherry was featured in the Kerrang! Week Of Rock Tour with The 69 Eyes and Hardcore Superstar at the HMV Forum in London. Other bands in the Week Of Rock included Limp Bizkit, Youmeatsix, and Lacuna Coil. DragonForce was also supposed to play during the Week Of Rock, but pulled out.

On September 29, 2009, Buckcherry released their first live album, Live & Loud 2009, which they played some of their biggest songs such as "Sorry", "Lit Up", "Crazy Bitch", and much more. The album was recorded in May 2009 during their Canadian tour in Edmonton, Calgary, Medicine Hat, and Regina.

=== 2010–2013: All Night Long and Confessions ===
It was announced on February 22, 2010, that Buckcherry would be a part of Rocklahoma 2010 in Pryor, Oklahoma.

Bassist Jimmy Ashhurst is one of the characters in the book Sex Tips from Rock Stars by Paul Miles, published by Omnibus Press in July 2010.

Buckcherry released their fifth studio album, titled All Night Long, on August 3, 2010. The album was mixed by Mike Fraser. The first single from the album, "All Night Long", was originally going to be released to rock radio on May 3, but was pushed back to May 24. It was released as a free download to all fans who posted a pre-defined "tweet" on Twitter or a similar message on Facebook on May 4. The album debuted at No. 10 on the Billboard Top 200 Album chart and was the No. 1 Rock debut.

The band released the holiday themed single "Christmas is Here" as a digital download on November 30, 2010.

From January 19 to March 18, 2011, Buckcherry toured with Hellyeah and All That Remains on the Jägermeister Music Tour.

As of June 2011, according to Keith Nelson, the band were already writing new material for their next album.

The band contributed the song, "Wherever I Go," for the Avengers Assemble soundtrack.

Buckcherry's sixth album, Confessions, was released February 19, 2013. The first single from Confessions, "Gluttony", was made available for streaming on December 7, 2012.

=== 2014–2020: Fuck EP, Rock 'N' Roll and Warpaint ===
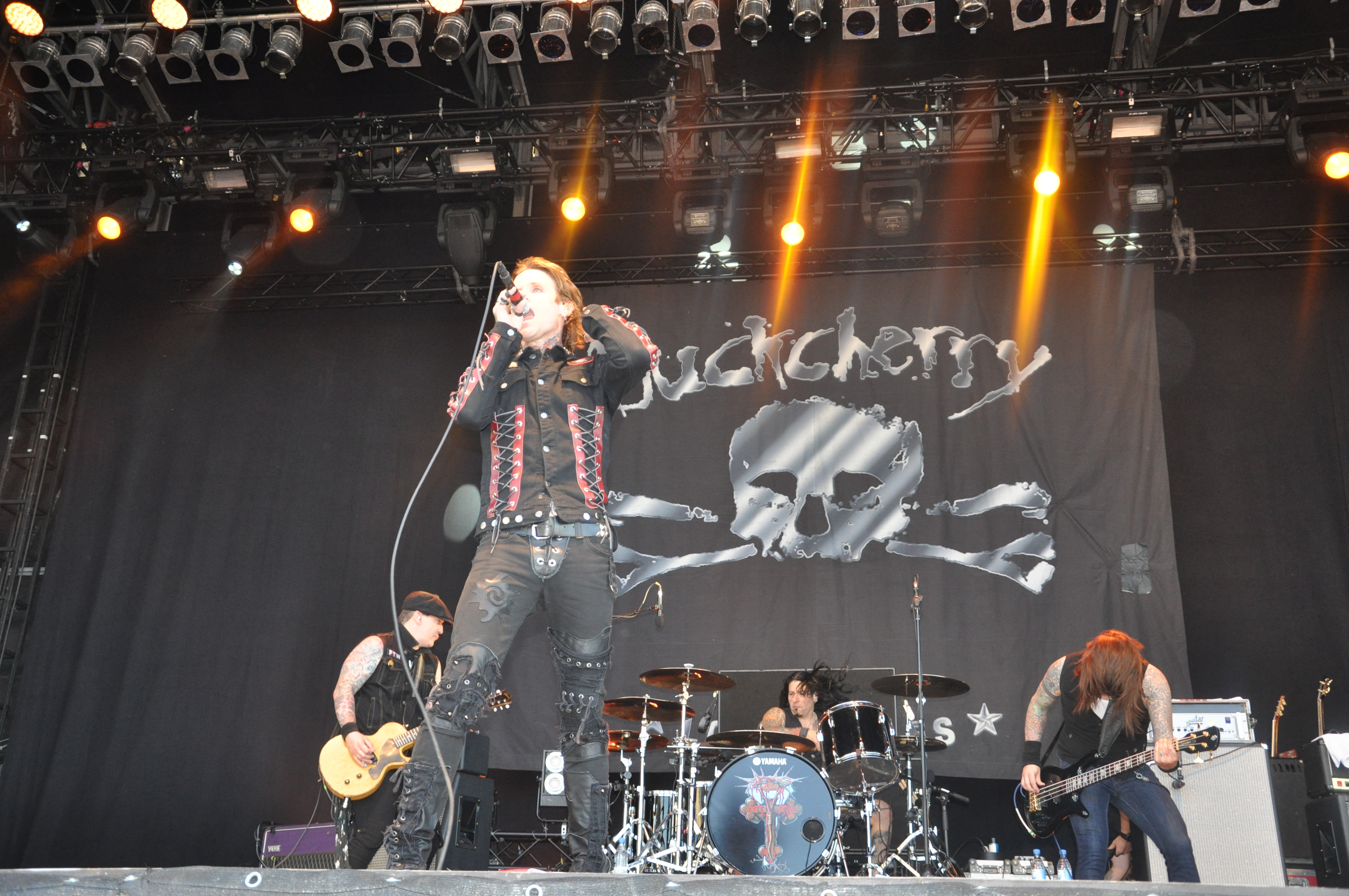
Buckcherry at Rock am Ring 2014

Fuck was released on August 19, 2014. The title of every song on the EP includes the word "Fuck". The song, "Say Fuck It" is a cover of the 2012 Icona Pop song "I Love It", with a few modifications in the lyrics.

Buckcherry took part in VampPark Fest on February 19, 2015, hosted by the rock band Vamps at the Nippon Budokan.

Buckcherry's seventh studio album Rock 'n' Roll was released on August 21, 2015. On June 2, 2015, "Bring It On Back" was released as the first single from the album. A second single, "The Feeling Never Dies," which features country singer Gretchen Wilson, was released February 17, 2016.

In May 2017, Keith Nelson and Xavier Muriel left the band due to disagreements with Josh Todd over the band's direction. The band was said by Eddie Trunk and former bassist Jimmy Ashhurst to have over-toured. This was one of many reasons Keith and Xavier left the band. However Keith and Xavier have both stated they have no hard feelings. The band brought in new members guitarist Kevin Roentgen and drummer Sean Winchester shortly afterwards. Nelson's departure left Josh Todd as the only remaining original member of Buckcherry.

The band's eighth studio album Warpaint was released in 2019. The title track was released on February 8, 2019, and the full album on March 8, 2019.

Guitarist Kevin Roentgen left the band in July 2020. He was later replaced by Jetboy guitarist Billy Rowe.

In October 2020, it was reported that Buckcherry were due to enter the studio to record a new album.

=== 2021–present: Hellbound, Vol. 10 and Roar Like Thunder ===
On April 21, 2021, Buckcherry announced their ninth album Hellbound (released on June 25, 2021, through Earache Records and Round Hill Records), along with the release of the single "So Hott" and its accompanying video (which was nominated for Classic Rock magazine's Track Of The Week) and the announcement of a North American tour with dates from June 2021 - November 2021. Hellbound was produced by Marti Frederiksen (who has previously collaborated with Aerosmith, Def Leppard, Jonny Lang and Sheryl Crow - he's "like the sixth member of Aerosmith," said Buckcherry guitarist Stevie D) and is being sold on a variety of collectable vinyl (pink, yellow and orange via Earache Records and black and clear smoke vinyl via Round Hill Records).

In November 2024, it was announced that the band had entered the studio in Nashville with producer Marti Frederiksen to record their eleventh album. The band's eleventh studio album, Roar Like Thunder, was released on June 13, 2025. The album was preceded by the title track and "Come On" as the first two singles. In promotion for the record, Buckcherry announced the Roar Like Thunder Tour for the summer of 2026. On August 21, 2026, their tour bus was involved in a fatal crash on I-26 near Spartanburg, South Carolina. A pedestrian involved in a single car crash was attempting to crawl from their wrecked vehicle when they were hit and killed by another vehicle, which then resulted in a multi-vehicle pile up. This occurred right in front of the band's bus, which rolled right into the wreck. All members of the band survived and walked away from the crash unharmed. The band expressed their grief and sadness over the victim, then announced the tour would continue on as planned.

== Influences ==
Buckcherry have cited influences including Soundgarden, Aerosmith, the Rolling Stones, AC/DC, Rage Against the Machine, Metallica, Love/Hate, Yazoo, Prince, Lionel Richie, Stone Temple Pilots, Kiss, Ian Astbury, Jack White, Led Zeppelin, Van Halen, Urge Overkill, the Sex Pistols, the Bottle Rockets, Howlin’ Wolf, Bruce Springsteen, Ben Harper, Muddy Waters, Otis Redding, Carole King, the Faces, Subhumans, Toy Dolls, Minor Threat and Black Flag.

== Band members ==
Current members

- Josh Todd – lead vocals (1995–2002, 2005–present)
- Stevie D. – lead & rhythm guitar, backing vocals (2005–present)
- Kelly LeMieux – bass, backing vocals (2013–present)
- Francis Ruiz – drums (2019–present)
- Billy Rowe – rhythm & lead guitar, backing vocals (2020–present)

Former members

- Keith Nelson – lead guitar, backing vocals (1995–2002, 2005–2017)
- Devon Glenn – drums (1995–2002)
- Jonathan Brightman – bass (1995–2001)
- Yogi Lonich – rhythm guitar, backing vocals (1999–2001)
- Josh Fleeger – rhythm guitar (2001–2002)
- Dave Markasky – bass (2001–2002)
- Matt Lawrence – drums (2002)
- Xavier Muriel – drums (2005–2017)
- Jimmy Ashhurst – bass, backing vocals (2005–2013)
- Kevin Roentgen – rhythm & lead guitar, backing vocals (2017–2020)
- Sean Winchester – drums (2017–2018)

== Awards and nominations ==
=== BDS Spin Awards ===
Buckcherry has received two awards.

Year	Nominee / work	Award	Result
2007	"Everything"	50,000 Spins	Won
2007	"Crazy Bitch"	100,000 Spins	Won

=== Billboard Music Video Awards ===
Year	Nominee / work	Award	Result	Ref.
1999	Buckcherry	Best New Artist	Nominated	
1999	Buckcherry	Best Modern Rock Clip (Lit Up)	Nominated	

=== BMI Awards ===
The BMI Awards are accolades presented annually by Broadcast Music, Inc., honouring songwriters, composers, and music publishers in various genres.

Year	Nominee / work	Award	Result
2009	"Sorry"	Best Pop	Won

=== Grammy Awards ===
Year	Nominee / work	Award	Result
2000	"Lit Up"	Best Hard Rock Performance	Nominated
2007	"Crazy Bitch"	Best Hard Rock Performance	Nominated

=== Kerrang! Music Awards ===
Buckcherry has received one award.

Year	Nominee / work	Award	Result
1999	Buckcherry	Best International Newcomer	Won

== Discography ==
Studio albums

- Buckcherry (1999)
- Time Bomb (2001)
- 15 (2005)
- Black Butterfly (2008)
- All Night Long (2010)
- Confessions (2013)
- Rock 'n' Roll (2015)
- Warpaint (2019)
- Hellbound (2021)
- Vol. 10 (2023)
- Roar Like Thunder (2025)
