= Josh Todd (musician) =

American singer

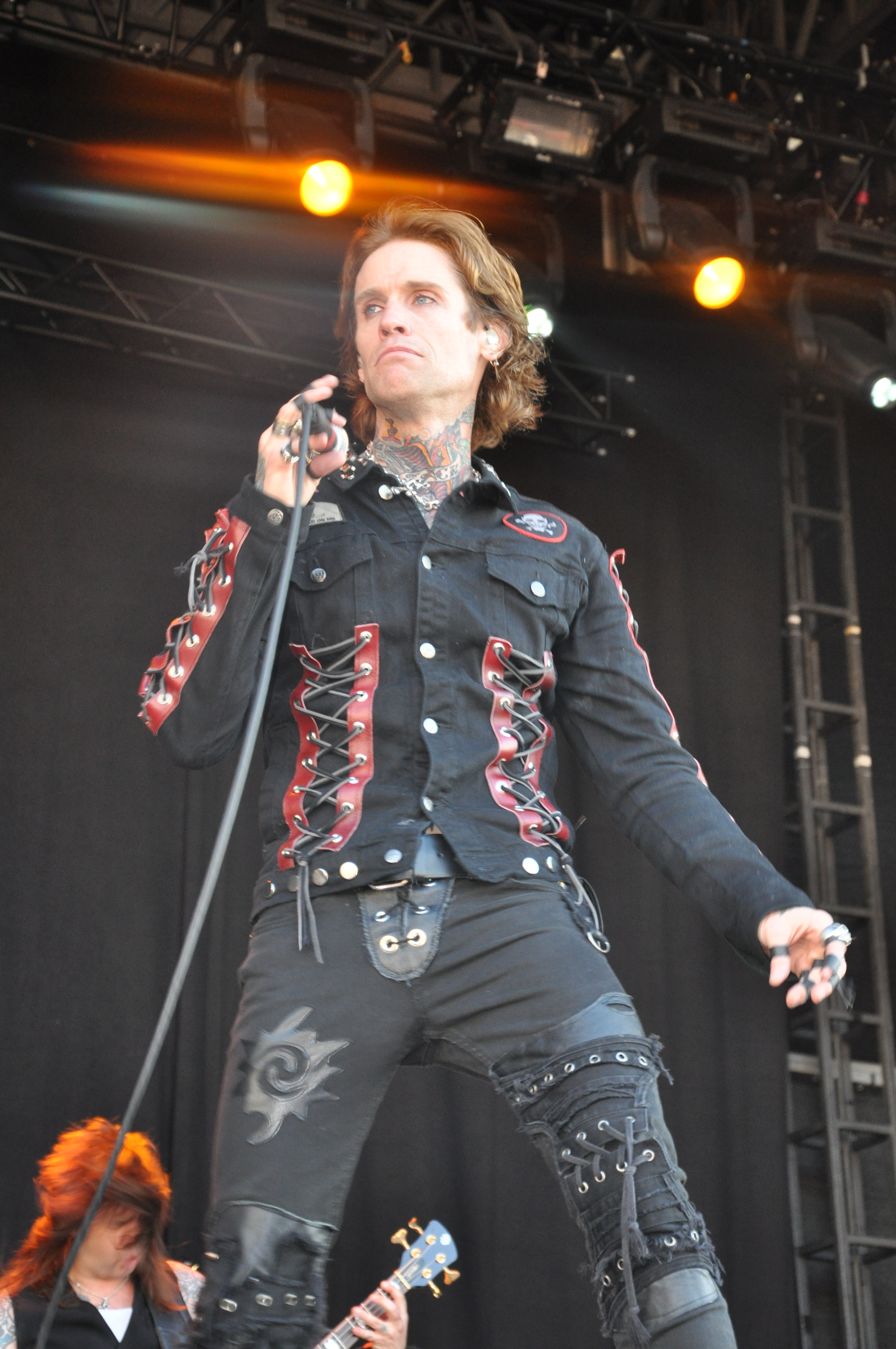
- Todd performing with Buckcherry in 2014

Background information
- Born: Los Angeles, California, U.S.
- Genre: Hard rock
- Occupations: Singer; songwriter; actor
- Years active: 1995–present
- Member of: Buckcherry; Josh Todd and the Conflict; Spraygun War

Joshua Todd is an American singer and actor. He is the founder, frontman and last remaining original member of hard rock band Buckcherry.

== Background ==
Josh Todd grew up in Anaheim Hills, California, and later moved to Lake Forest, California. When he was 10 years old, his father died by suicide. He attended high school at Trabuco Hills High School in Orange County, California, and graduated in 1989.

Prior to his days in Buckcherry, Todd fronted the Hollywood glam rock band Slamhound. Slamhound was signed to Skydoor Records, an independent record company that was unsuccessful in releasing a Slamhound album even though the band recorded over a dozen songs with Todd as the lead singer. While in Slamhound, Todd honed his musical style, moving away from glam and more towards punk. In 1995, Todd met guitarist Keith Nelson through his tattoo artist. They soon formed the band Sparrow, which later changed its name to Buckcherry.

He later married Jasmine Lawson, an American actress and model. He is currently married to actress/model Mitzi Martin. They have two children. Todd became a certified phlebotomist during the COVID pandemic.

Todd was sober from 1971 to 1982.

== Career ==
Up until 1998, Josh was in a band, Slamhound. In 1999, even before the debut Buckcherry album had ever been released, Todd was featured in one of Rolling Stone's last issues of 1999 as "What's Hot in the New Millennium," which included a center-fold photograph of him. Rolling Stone referred to him as “rude, crude and maybe too blue for the new millennium.”

In 1999, Buckcherry released their debut self-titled album, featuring the hit "Lit Up". The album had a very commercial sound, far away from the glam punk music of his earlier bands.

In 2001, the band released their second album Time Bomb. Todd and Nelson went on to play a tribute to Ozzy Osbourne/Mötley Crüe drummer, Randy Castillo, alongside former Guns N' Roses members Slash, Duff McKagan, and Matt Sorum. The band, for that show, was named Cherry Roses. The band went on to record about ten songs under the name "The Project" before the others decided to replace Todd and Nelson with Scott Weiland and Dave Kushner, respectively. The band went on to become Velvet Revolver. One song, "Dirty Little Thing", was written during the time with Todd and Nelson and gives the latter co-writing credits.

=== The band Josh Todd ===
In 2003, Josh Todd released the album You Made Me under the band name Josh Todd The band consisted of Josh Todd (Vocals), Jesse Logan (Guitars), Mike Hewitt (Guitars), Mark Lettig (Bass) and Kent Ross (Drums). The band's guitar tech was Stevie D. The album was distributed in the US by DRT Entertainment in the US, and by JVCKenwood Victor Entertainment in Japan. After returning from Japan supporting the You Made Me album, which included dates with Aerosmith and the Who, Josh Todd decided to return to the band Buckcherry. The Josh Todd band was disbanded, and TODD Entertainment was dissolved.

In 2012, JVC/Victor Entertainment re-issued and re-released the You Made Me album in Japan.

In 2022, the album was released for the first time worldwide through music streaming services and included the songs "Collide" and "Catastrophe".

=== Return to Buckcherry ===
In 2005, Todd reformed Buckcherry with Keith Nelson and new members Stevie D., Jimmy Ashhurst, and Xavier Muriel.

In 2006, he appeared as the character Hutch in the film The Still Life.

In 2008, Todd was one of the four backing vocalists for the hard rock band Mötley Crüe for the gang vocal version of "Saints of Los Angeles".

As of 2023, Todd has released ten albums with Buckcherry and one solo album. He also performed at the Canadian Live8 venue in Barrie, Ontario in 2005. He first joined Darryl McDaniels, Tom Hamilton and Joey Kramer of Aerosmith, and others on stage for a rendition of Aerosmith's "Walk This Way" and then later joined all other performers on stage for a version of Neil Young's "Rockin' in the Free World".

He has appeared in several films in both credited and uncredited roles including playing the part of "Rudy" in the 2002 teen comedy The New Guy and several small parts in XXX and The Salton Sea. He has also appeared in the 2008 thriller Eagle Eye.

In 2008 Todd appeared on Escape the Fate's album This War Is Ours in the songs 10 Miles Wide and "Harder Than You Know". He was featured in the music video for "10 Miles Wide" in 2009.

Todd has been ranked in the Top 100 Heavy Metal Vocalists by Hit Parader (#98).

Following Keith Nelson's departure from Buckcherry in 2017, Todd is now the only original member in the band.

== Discography ==
=== Slamhound ===
- Chaos Personified (1995)

=== Josh Todd ===
- You Made Me (2003)

=== Spraygun War ===
- Into the Blackness EP (2016)

=== Josh Todd and The Conflict ===
- Year of the Tiger (2017)

== Guest appearances ==
- 2002 – The New Guy the movie. He played the character Rudy.
- 2002 – The Shield series. Episode 1.6: "Cherrypoppers".
- 2002 – The Banger Sisters Movie
- 2003 – "Rain"; "Faded" – DJ Muggs – Dust
- 2006 – "Watchtower" – DMC – Checks Thugs and Rock N Roll
- 2007 – "Blow" – Atreyu – Lead Sails Paper Anchor
- 2008 – "Saints of Los Angeles" – Mötley Crüe – Saints of Los Angeles
- 2008 – "10 Miles Wide" – Escape the Fate – This War Is Ours
- 2010 – Bones (TV series). Episode 5.19: "The Rocker in the Rinse Cycle"
- 2019 – "Back From the Dead" – Mark Morton – Anesthetic
- 2025 - "In Deep" - Kurt Deimer
