= Sumo (disambiguation) =

Sumo is a form of wrestling.

Sumo may also refer to:

== People ==
- Sumo (people), a people of Central America
- Sumo language (disambiguation)

== Science ==
- Suggested Upper Merged Ontology, a foundation ontology for a variety of computer information processing systems
- SUMO protein, small ubiquitin-like modifier

== Arts and entertainment ==
- Sumo, a character in Clarence (2014 TV series)
- SuMo, abbreviation for the Pokémon Sun and Moon video games
- Sumo (album), an album by The Superjesus
- Sumo (band), an Argentine band
- Sumo (book), a book by Helmut Newton
- Sumo (comics), a Marvel Comics character
- Sumo (film), a 2025 Indian Tamil-language film by S. P. Hosimin
- Sumo Digital, a developer of video games
- Sumo (video games), a genre of games based on the sport
- "Sumo", a song by Denzel Curry from Ta13oo

== Software ==
- Simulation of Urban MObility (SUMO), an open-source traffic simulator
- Sumo, a digital creative toolbox that includes Sumopaint 2.0, Sumotunes, Sumocode, Sumo3d, Sumovideo, and Sumophoto as of June 2020

== Transportation ==
- Supermoto, a style of motorcycle
- Tata Sumo, a 4x4 sport-utility vehicle

== Other uses ==
- Sumo citrus, a marketing name for the Dekopon mandarin in the United States
