= George Holz =

American photographer (born 1956)

- Born: October 19, 1956 (age 69); Oak Ridge, Tennessee, U.S.
- Education: BFA Photography
- Alma mater: Art Center College of Design
- Known for: Photography
- Style: Black-and-white photography, Celebrity photography
- Awards: Clio Award, Grammy Award
- Website: georgeholz.com

George Holz was born in Oak Ridge, Tennessee (aka "the Secret City"), graduated from the Art Center College of Design in Pasadena, California, and assisted for Helmut Newton, whom he credits with guiding his career. As a fledgling photographer, he lived in Milan and Paris, where he shot beauty and fashion for major European magazines such as Italian Vogue and French Elle. Afterward, he moved to New York City, where he set up his famous studio on Lafayette Street, traveling frequently to Los Angeles and Europe to shoot fashion, advertising, and portraiture for major publications such as Vanity Fair and Harper's Bazaar. His fine-art nudes have been exhibited in galleries and museums around the world. His shows have included "Original Sin" and "Three Boys from Pasadena – A Tribute to Helmut Newton" with fellow Art Center alumni Just Loomis and Mark Arbeit. Holz has collected a variety of prestigious industry awards over the years including a Grammy and a Clio.

Holz works as an adjunct professor and lectures internationally at museums and universities, emphasizing his vision to "always begin and end with light, " to "do it all in-camera," and to "bring modern photography back to the level of the artful burn and dodge of the past."

Holz continues to travel extensively for his commercial work, fine-art shows, and lectures, and is currently working on several projects, including his upcoming book of nudes. When not exploring remote locations and photographing his muses, George's favorite pastimes include traveling the American backroads in his '58 Airstream and conversing with his chocolate lab, Ruby.

== Career ==
=== Early work ===
A native of Oak Ridge, Tennessee, Holz received his first camera as a gift at age 15, a Minolta SR-T 101. With this camera, he took a photo of country star Lynn Anderson, which was published in People Magazine when Holz was still a teenager. After graduating from high school, Holz traveled to Europe and Israel, practicing travel and documentary photography. Holz was educated at the Art Center College of Design in Pasadena, California. While there, he apprenticed with Helmut Newton. Newton encouraged Holz to go to Europe and Holz spent several years at the beginning of his career in Milan, where his fashion editorials appeared in European publications such as Vogue Italia, Madame Figaro, and French Elle. He then returned to Los Angeles and focused on shooting album covers, including Madonna's Borderline.

After his success in Europe, Holz moved to New York in the mid-1980s, where he opened a studio in Greenwich Village. He continued to shoot fashion editorial for Harper's Bazaar, Interview Magazine and The New York Times, and began celebrity portraiture as well, publishing his images in InStyle, People, Glamour, Rolling Stone, Entertainment Weekly, GQ, and Vanity Fair. Notably, Holz was one of the first major photographers to shoot Angelina Jolie at the beginning of her career.

=== Current work ===
Holz has moved between editorial and advertising work for the past two decades. He created numerous advertising campaigns, including ones for Elizabeth Arden, Bloomingdales, DeBeers and Max Factor, and won a Clio Award for his campaign for the International Gold Corporation. Holz continued to lens the artwork for a number of albums, including those of Shania Twain, Lindsay Lohan, Mariah Carey, Van Halen, Joan Jett, Boyz II Men, and Chaka Khan. In 1990, he won a Grammy for his artwork on Suzanne Vega's album Days of Open Hand.

Holz also began shooting movie posters, including those for Face/Off, The General's Daughter, Along Came a Spider, and Glitter as well as the print campaigns for TV shows House, Smash, Fringe, and Hell's Kitchen. In 2003, George appeared on America's Next Top Model, shooting the models underwater in a tank and serving as a judge.

=== Books ===
In 1997, Holz' Original Sin, the exhibition catalogue to his traveling exhibit was published by Domeqc. His collection of celebrity portraits, HOLZ HOLLYWOOD: 30 YEARS OF PORTRAITS" was published by DAAB MEDIA in April, 2015

== Style ==
Holz calls his style "painting with light" and his work betrays a sensuous, nuanced vision. Holz has shot both celebrities and nudes, two groups likely to become inhibited in front of the camera. His extensive work in both areas indicates his facility with making subjects comfortable and his ability to draw out his subjects.

Holz is most known for his black and white nudes, which he has been shooting since 1974 and which have been exhibited widely. Many of the nudes are shot at Holz' farm in Upstate New York, with the subjects posed outside in nature. Holz began a unique project photographing nudes posed with animal bones, tortoiseshells, and antlers, contrasting living flesh with ancient relics. He also photographed nudes with found objects, juxtaposing the natural and the manmade.

== Exhibits ==
George Holz has been the subject of international solo shows in Budapest, Hungary, and the University of Applied Arts, Vienna (Photographs By George Holz, 1990) and part of a group show Laforet Museum in Tokyo (The Nude in Photography, 1993). His first one-man show was at the Center for Photography at Woodstock in New York.

Holz' art show "Original Sin" was exhibited at the Fahey/Klein Gallery in Los Angeles, the Staley Wise Gallery in New York City, the Gallery for Fine Photography in New Orleans, the John Cleary Gallery in Houston and the Robert Klein Gallery in Boston, in 1997–98. It also traveled to fine art galleries in New Orleans, Houston, and San Francisco.

In 2009, Holz was the subject, along with Just Loomis and Mark Arbeit, of the exhibit "Three Boys from Pasadena: A Tribute to Helmut Newton." Conceived and curated by Newton's widow June Newton, the exhibit was devoted to Newton's three longtime assistants and collaborators, and explored Newton's influence on their later work. The show premiered at the Helmut Newton Foundation in Berlin, and was exhibited in Paris and New York. In April 2012, the exhibit will be part of Art Cologne, and in June 2012, it will make its West Coast debut at the Williamson Gallery of the Art Center College of Design in Pasadena. An accompanying book, "Three Boys from Pasadena," with an introduction by June Newton, was published in 2010. The book featured a mix of personal work by Loomis, Arbeit and Holz, with memorabilia of their time as Newton's assistants, including contact sheets, letters, snapshots, and journal pages.

Holz' work is in the permanent collection of the International Museum of Photography and Film at the George Eastman House in Rochester, New York, and the Centro Cultural/Arte Contemporaneo in Mexico City.

== Selected exhibitions ==
- The Art of Persuasion: A History of Advertising Photography, International Museum of Photography at the George Eastman House, Rochester NY, 1988 (permanent collection)
- George Holz: Photographs The Center for Photography at Woodstock, 1989
- Photographs by George Holz: Hohschule fur Angewandte Hunst, Vienna, 1990
- George Holz: G. Ray Hawkins Gallery, Los Angeles, 1991
- Nude in Photography: La Foret Museum, Tokyo, 1993
- George Holz Platinum Nudes: The Platinum Gallery Santa Fe, New Mexico, 1996
- Original Sin: Staley Wise Gallery, New York, Robert Koch Gallery, San Francisco, Fahey Klein Gallery, Los Angeles, A Gallery for Fine Photography, New Orleans, Robert Klein Gallery, Boston, John Cleary Gallery, Houston, 1997–1998
- Centro Cultural /Arte Contemporaneo, Mexico City 1999 (permanent collection)
- The Portrait/The Nude III: Fahey Klein Gallery, Los Angeles, 2001
- Three Boys from Pasadena: George Holz, Mark Arbeit, and Just Loomis: A Tribute to Helmut Newton Curated by June Newton: Helmut Newton
- Foundation, Berlin 2009, Acte 2 Galerie, Paris 2010, and Clic Gallery, New York 2010, Art Cologne 2012, Williamson Gallery, Art Center College of Design, 2012 Pasadena, Eyeloco Gallery, Antwerp 2012
- George Holz: HOLZ HOLLYWOOD: 30 YEARS OF PORTRAITS – Private Show, Kaune, Posnik, Spohr Gallery, Cologne, Germany 2015
- FAME: Galleri Fine Art/Qvale Galleri, Oslo Norway May, 2019
- George Holz; Three Boys from Pasadena, Helmut Newton Foundation: Berlin Germany, June 2019

== Selected clients ==
Arena Magazine, Avon, Axe, Bergdorf Goodman, Bloomingdales, Capitol Records, Caress, CBS, Chloe, Clairol, Cover Girl, Disney, Dove Chocolate, Drambuie, E!, Entertainment Weekly, Essence Magazine, Flaunt Magazine, Fox Broadcasting Company, General Mills, Glamour Magazine, GQ, Hanes, Hershey's, In Style, Italian Vogue, Kohler, L'eggs, L'Oreal, Lucky Magazine, Men's Health, Men's Journal, Mercury Records, Natori, New York Magazine, Nike, Oprah, Paramount Pictures, People, Pepsi, Reebok, Rolling Stone, Saks Fifth Ave, Self Magazine, Seventeen Magazine, Sony Records, Spin Magazine, Tequila Sauza, Turner Broadcasting, Vanity Fair, Virgin Records, Warner Bros Records, WB Network, Wrigleys, YMI

== Videos ==
MASTER SERIES: George Holz Diagrams Lighting for Beyonce Shoot

MASTER SERIES: In Conversation With George Holz

MASTER SERIES: George Holz Photographs Jack Nickolson

MASTER SERIES: George Holz on his Favorite Light Shapers

MASTER SERIES: George Holz Photographs Megan Mullally and Yoko Ono

MASTER SERIES: George Holz Diagrams Lighting for Fringe Shoot
