= Helmut Newton =

German-Australian photographer (1920–2004)

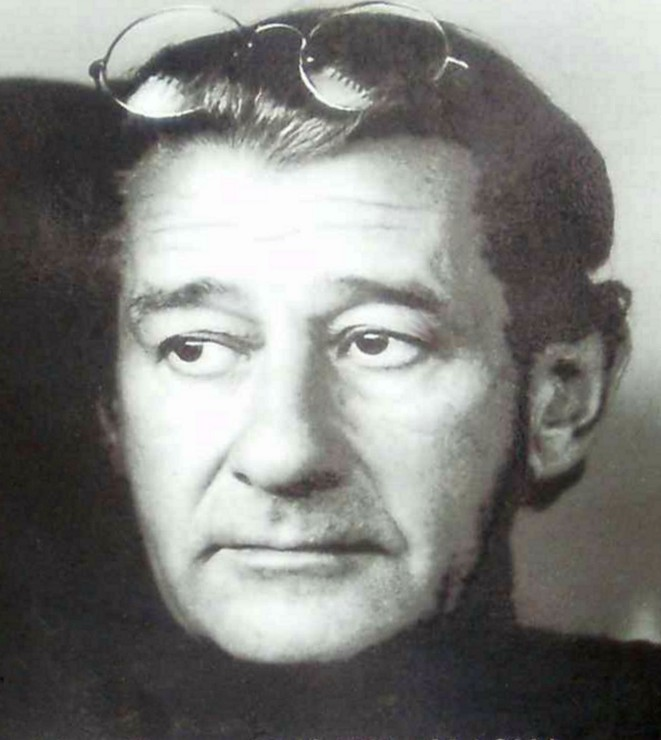
- Portrait by his wife June
- Born: Helmut Neustädter; 31 October 1920; Berlin, Germany
- Died: 23 January 2004 (aged 83); Los Angeles, California, US
- Occupation: Photographer
- Years active: 1936−2003
- Spouse: June Browne (m. 1948)

Helmut Newton (né Neustädter; 31 October 1920 – 23 January 2004) was a German-Australian photographer. The New York Times described him as a "prolific, widely imitated fashion photographer whose provocative, erotically charged black-and-white photos were a mainstay of Vogue and other publications."

== Early life ==
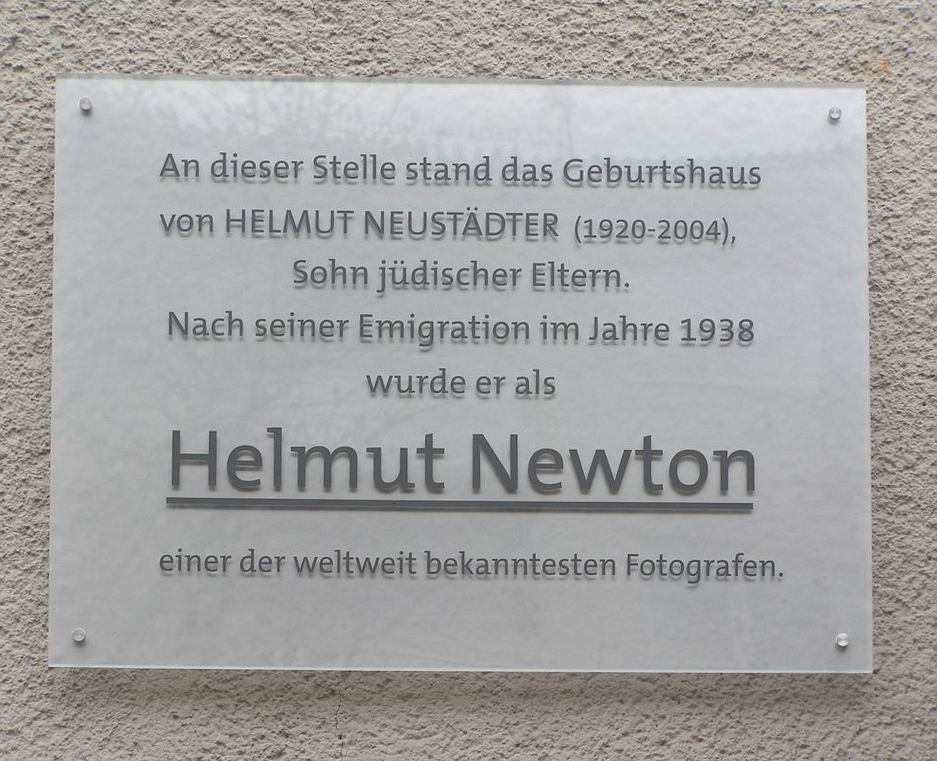
Plaque at his birthhouse in Schöneberg, Berlin. Translation: "At this spot used to stand the birthhouse of HELMUT NEUSTÄDTER (1920–2004), son of Jewish parents. After his emigration in 1938 he became known as HELMUT NEWTON, one of the most famous photographers worldwide."

Newton was born in Berlin, the son of Klara "Claire" (née Marquis) and Max Neustädter, a button factory owner. His family was Jewish. Newton attended the Heinrich-von-Treitschke-Realgymnasium and the American School in Berlin. Interested in photography from the age of 12, when he purchased his first camera, he worked for the German photographer Yva (Elsie Neuländer Simon) from 1936.

The increasingly oppressive restrictions placed on Jews under the Nuremberg Laws, meant that his father lost control of the factory in which he manufactured buttons and buckles. He was briefly interned in a concentration camp on Kristallnacht, 9 November 1938, which finally compelled the family to leave Germany. Newton's parents fled to Argentina. Newton was issued a passport just after turning 18 and left Germany on 5 December 1938. At Trieste, he boarded the Conte Rosso, along with about 200 others escaping the Nazis, intending to journey to China. After arriving in Singapore, Newton found he was able to remain there, first briefly as a photographer for the Straits Times and then as a portrait photographer.

== From 1940: Life in Australia ==
Newton was interned by British authorities while in Singapore and was sent to Australia on board the Queen Mary, arriving in Sydney on 27 September 1940. Internees were taken to a camp at Tatura by train under armed guard. Newton was released from internment in 1942 and briefly worked as a fruit picker in Northern Victoria. In August 1942, he enlisted with the Australian Army and worked as a truck driver. After the war in 1945, he became a British subject, and changed his name to Newton in 1946.

Helmut Newton's 1950 portrait of his wife June, modelling a "hat of the week" for Myer's Department Store

In 1948, he married actress June Browne, who performed under the stage name June Brunell. Later, she became a successful photographer, under the ironic pseudonym Alice Springs, after Alice Springs, the town in Central Australia.

In 1946, Newton set up a studio in fashionable Flinders Lane in Melbourne and worked on fashion, theatre and industrial photography in the affluent post-war years. In May 1953, he shared his first exhibition with Wolfgang Sievers, a German refugee like himself, who had also served in the same company. The exhibition, "New Visions in Photography", was displayed at the Federal Hotel in Collins Street and was probably the first presentation of New Objectivity photography in Australia. Newton went into partnership with Henry Talbot, a fellow German Jew, who had also been interned at Tatura, and his association with the studio continued even after 1957, when Newton left Australia for London. The studio was renamed Helmut Newton and Henry Talbot.

== Late 1950s: to London, Europe, a return to Australia ==
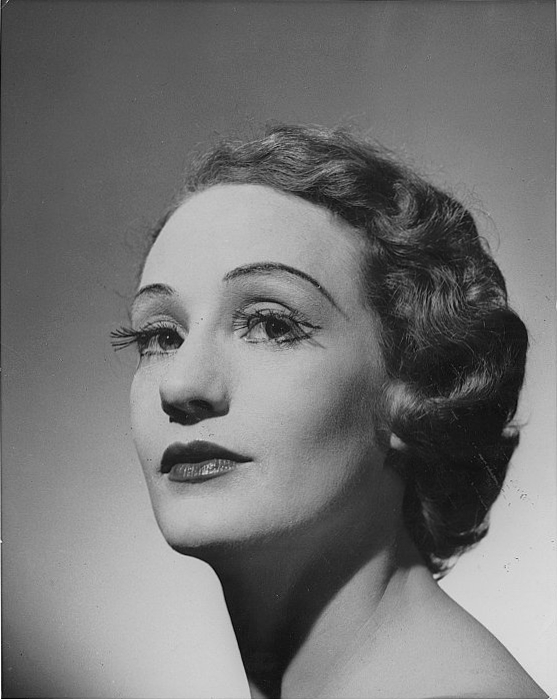
Portrait of Laurel Martyn, 1952

Newton's growing reputation as a fashion photographer was rewarded when he secured a commission to illustrate fashions in a special Australian supplement for Vogue magazine, published in January 1956. He won a 12-month contract with British Vogue and left for London in February 1957, leaving Talbot to manage the business. Newton left the magazine before the end of his contract and went to Paris, where he worked for French and German magazines. He returned to Melbourne in March 1959 to a contract for Australian Vogue.

== 1961: to Paris ==
Newton and his wife finally settled in Paris in 1961 and his work as a fashion photographer continued. His images appeared in magazines including the French edition of Vogue and Harper's Bazaar.

Newton established a particular style, marked by erotic, stylised images, often with sado-masochistic and fetishistic subtexts. A heart attack in 1970 reduced his output, but his wife's encouragement led to his profile continuing to expand, especially with the 1980 studio-bound stark infinity of the "Big Nudes" series. His "Naked and Dressed" portfolio followed and, in 1992, "Domestic Nudes", which marked the pinnacle of his erotic-urban style. The series were underpinned with the prowess of his technical skills. Newton also worked in portraiture and more fantastical studies.

Newton shot a number of pictorials for Playboy, including Nastassja Kinski and Kristine DeBell. Original prints of the photographs from his August 1976 pictorial of DeBell, "200 Motels, or How I Spent My Summer Vacation", were sold at auctions of Playboy archives by Bonhams in 2002 for $21,075, and by Christie's in December 2003 for $26,290.

== "Three Boys from Pasadena" ==
In 2009, June Browne conceptualised a tribute exhibition to Newton, featuring three photographers who had befriended Newton in Los Angeles in 1980: Mark Arbeit, Just Loomis, and George Holz. All three had been photography students at the Art Center College of Design in Pasadena, California. All three became friends with Helmut and June Newton and, to varying degrees, assisted Helmut Newton. Each went on to independent careers. The exhibition premiered at the Helmut Newton Foundation in Berlin and combined the work of all three with personal snapshots, contact sheets, and letters from their time with Newton.

== Polaroids ==
From the 1970s, Newton regularly used Polaroid instant cameras and film to get an immediate visualisation of composition and lighting, especially for his fashion photography. For the shoot of the "Naked and Dressed" series that started in 1981 for the Italian and French Vogue, he said he used Polaroid film "by the crate". The Polaroids also served as a sketchbook, in which he scribbled notes with regard to the model, client, location and date. In 1992, Newton published Pola Woman, a book consisting only of his Polaroids. Over 300 works based on the original Polaroids were shown at 2011 exhibition "Helmut Newton Polaroids", at the Museum für Fotografie in Berlin.

== Death ==
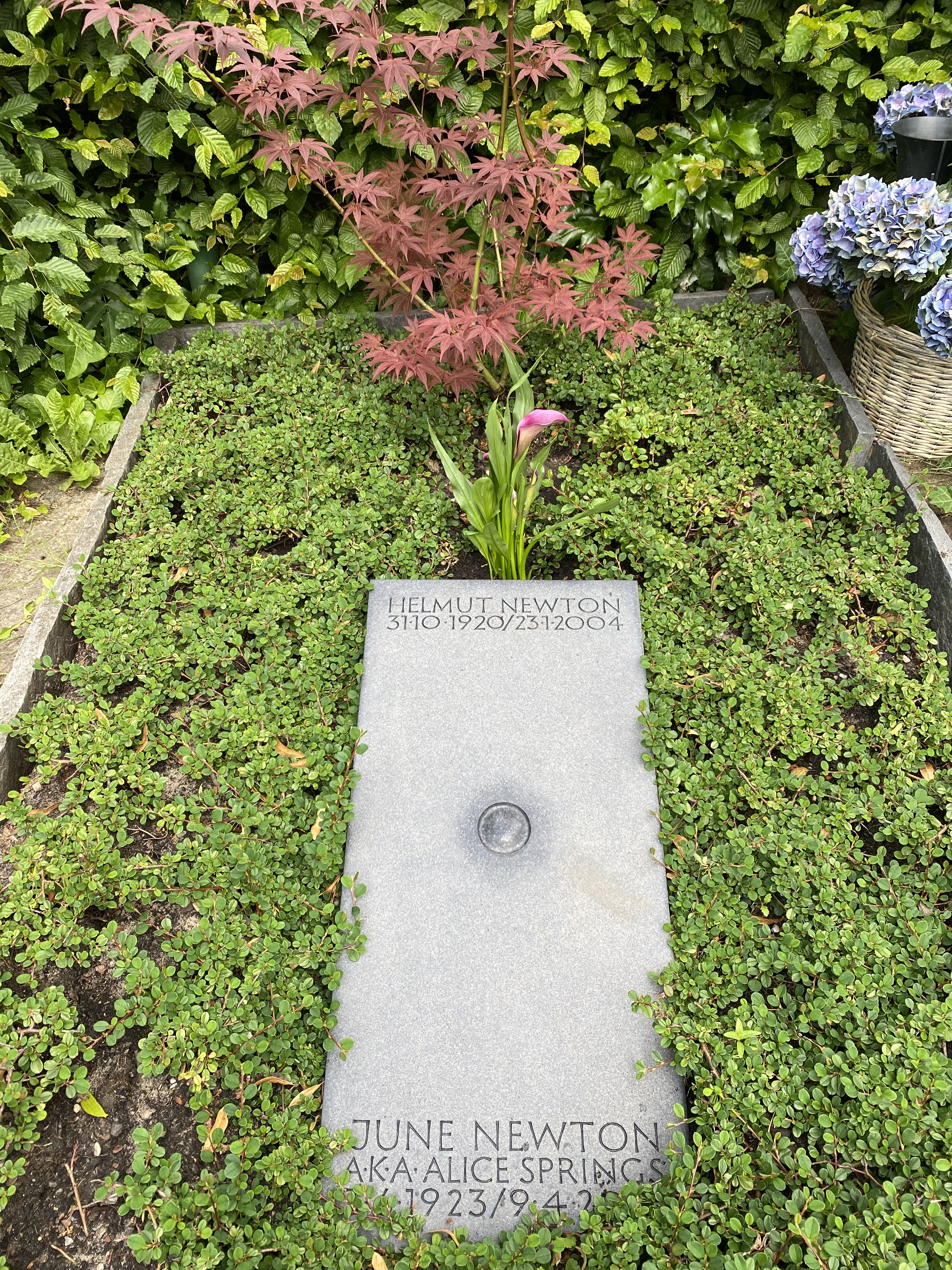
Grave of Helmut & June Newton in Berlin, Friedenau Cemetery

In later life, Newton lived in both Monte Carlo and Los Angeles, California, where he spent winters at the Chateau Marmont, which he had done every year since 1957. On 23 January 2004, he suffered a serious heart attack while driving down Marmont Lane from the Chateau Marmont to Sunset Boulevard. He was taken to Cedars-Sinai Medical Center but doctors were unable to save him, and he was pronounced dead. His ashes are buried at the Städtischer Friedhof III in Berlin.

== Legacy ==
In 2025 Helmut Newton's extensive work from 1980s ad campaigns were presented by Pomellato in the central fashion area of Tokyo's Omotesandō Crossing Park.

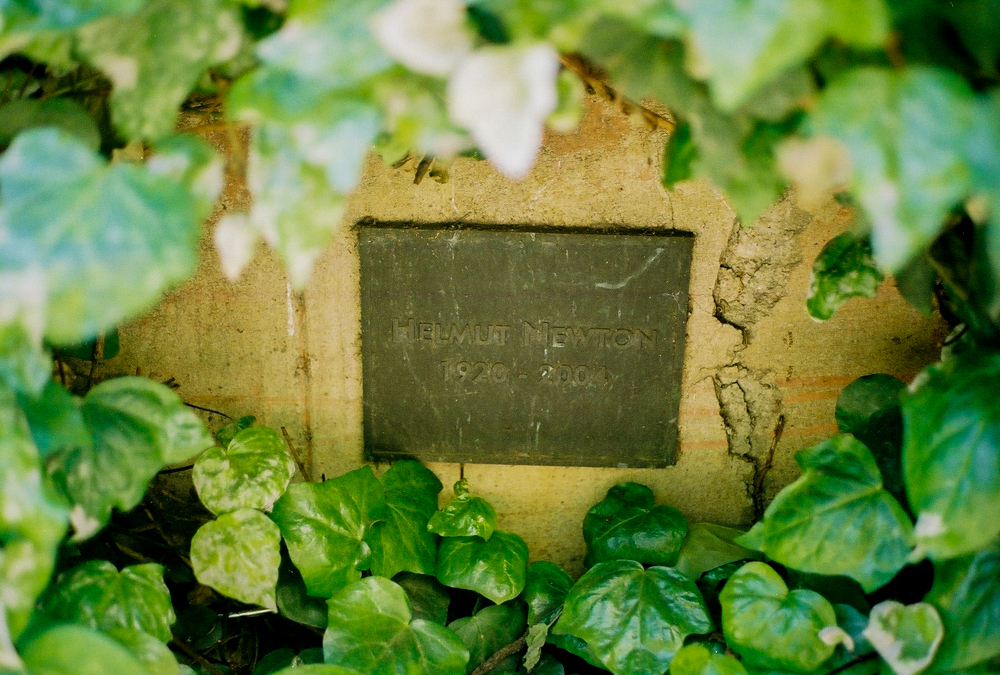
Memorial plaque at site of Helmut Newton's accident at the Chateau Marmont hotel in Los Angeles, marking the spot where his car hit the wall

== Published works, during his life ==
- Helmut Newton, White Women, New York: Congreve, 1976.
- Helmut Newton, Sleepless Nights, New York: Congreve, 1978.
- Helmut Newton, Big Nudes, Paris: Editions du Regard, 1981.
- Helmut Newton, "Sie kommen" ("They're Coming"), Paris: French Vogue, 1981.
- Helmut Newton, World Without Men, New York: Xavier Moreau, 1984.
- Klaus Honnef and Helmut Newton, Helmut Newton: Portraits, Schirmer Art Books, 1986.
- Marshall Blonsky & Helmut Newton, Private Property, Schirmer Art Books, 1989.
- Helmut Newton, Naked and Dressed in Hollywood, with an introduction by Jan van der Marck, Los Angeles: Pascal de Sarthe Gallery, 1992.
- Helmut Newton, Sumo book, Taschen, 1999.
- Helmut Newton and June Newton, Helmut Newton Work, edited by Manfred Heiting, Taschen, 2000.
- Helmut Newton, Autobiography, Nan A. Talese, 2003.

== Published works, after his death ==
- Helmut Newton, A Gun for Hire, edited by June Newton, Taschen, 2005.
- Helmut Newton, Playboy: Helmut Newton, Chronicle Books, 2005.
- Guy Featherstone, "Helmut Newton's Australian Years", in The La Trobe Journal, The State Library of Victoria Foundation, No 76, Spring, 2005.
- Klaus Neumann, In the Interest of National Security: Civilian Internment in Australia during World War II, Canberra: National Archives of Australia, 2006.

== See also ==
- Andrew Blake
- Michael Ninn
- Philip Mond
- Radley Metzger
- Tinto Brass
