= Mark Arbeit =

American photographer

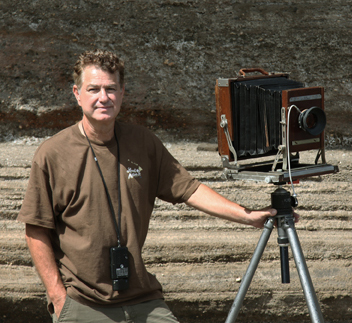
- Mark Arbeit, Hawaii 2010
- Born: March 15, 1953 (age 73); Chicago, Illinois, U.S.
- Occupation: Photographer
- Spouse: Pattariya Arbeit
- Website: www.markarbeit.com

Mark Arbeit (born March 15, 1953) is an American photographer known for his celebrity portraiture, fashion and beauty. His work has appeared in (France) Vogue, Marie Claire, Cosmopolitan, Figaro Madame, (US) Vanity Fair, InStyle, People, Forbes, (Australia) Harper's Bazaar, Vogue

== Early life ==
Mark Arbeit was born in Chicago, Illinois and raised in Northern California. When Arbeit was 16, his family moved to Oahu, Hawaii, where he first discovered photography. At 18, Arbeit enrolled in the University of Hawaii to study art. A few years later, he decided to focus solely on photography, and transferred to Art Center College of Design in Pasadena. During his third year there, he met Helmut Newton and became at first his assistant, then friend and his mentor for the next 25 years.

== Career ==
Upon finishing his studies, Arbeit moved to New York, and was hired by Irving Penn as a platinum print retoucher. After working for Penn, Arbeit moved to Milan to launch his own fashion photography career, and shot regularly for Linea Italia, Donna magazine and Vogue Bellezza.

In 1985, he settled in Paris to further his career as well as expand his artistic boundaries. To explore the experimental side of photography, Arbeit and a few ambitious photographer friends from the Art Center formed a group called 'The Cauldron.' Its mission was simple: to take pictures that had never been done before. Arbeit chose focus as his tool, and launched In & Out of Focus, a series of photographs in which in the foreground Arbeit focuses sharply on a flower and in the background; an out-of-focus female nude mimics the shape and movement of the bloom.

Arbeit continued work editorially, splitting his time between Paris and New York, shooting fashion for French Vogue and Marie Claire, and portraits for In Style magazine, People magazine and Forbes. In 1992, he launched a second series, 'Artist Atelier,' a series of female nudes in painter/ sculpture studios in Paris. Following the Atelier series, Arbeit launched a project called 'Polajunk Constructions': a collection of photomontages made of the Polaroid's positive/ negative and incorporating all the paraphernalia that comes in a Polaroid box.

In 1994, on vacation visiting family on Oahu, Arbeit began working with an 8X10 inch Deardorff camera on a study of the Hawaiian Islands. For it, he has photographed the island people, the stunning mountainous landscapes and the flawless beaches.

In 2009, June Newton conceptualized a tribute exhibition to Helmut, based around three photographers who had trained extensively under Helmut: Mark Arbeit, Just Loomis, and George Holz. All three had been photography students at The Art Center College of Design in Pasadena, California in 1979 when they became Newton's longtime assistants, and all three went on to independent careers. The exhibit premiered at the Helmut Newton Foundation in Berlin and combined the work of all three with personal snapshots, contact sheets, and letters from their time with Helmut.

In 2005 Arbeit moved back to Honolulu, Hawaii, shooting fashion and celebrity editorial for local and national magazine. During this period Arbeit work on two important photographic series. ‘Torso’, a surreal look at the female nude; covering the head, arms and legs of the model with black velvet, exposing only the torso. The second series, ‘Photograms’, began with a message Arbeit received from Helmut Newton, eight years after his death. Life size photograms of female nudes, lying on silver gelatin photo paper, photographed and developed all in a darkroom.

Mark Arbeit continues photographing Fashion and Celebrity editorial and pursuing his personal artistic work.

== Style ==
Arbeit's Celebrity, fashion and beauty is of a classical style. His personal work is experimental and avant-garde with a classical touch.

== Documentary film ==
- Photograms-Mark Arbeit
- Three Boys From Pasadena: A Tribute to Helmut Newton
- Helmut Newton: Provocateur

== Artistic influences and techniques ==
The influences on his work include:

- Helmut Newton (e.g. lighting, Fashion, Artistic nude)
- Irving Penn (e.g., Darkroom Technique, Lighting Technique, Portraiture, Fashion)
- Man Ray (e.g., Rayographs, surrealism, the female nude)
- Erwin Blumenfeld (e.g., Female nudes, Beauty, Fashion)

== Books ==
- Torso, Published in 2019, Introduction by Matthias Harder, Curator of the Helmut Newton Foundation. This second Monograph is Arbeit's study on beauty and form.
- Three Boys from Pasadena, Published in 2010, Introduction by June Newton. The book featured a mix of personal work by Mark Arbeit, Just Loomis and George Holz, with memorabilia of their time as Newton's assistants, including contact sheets, Polaroids, letters, snapshots, and journal pages.
- Mark Arbeit Work, Published in 2009, Introduction by June Newton, Art Direction by Thomas Defays. This first Monograph is a collection of Arbeit's personal artistic projects. Each chapter is separated by a theme: Artist Atelier, In and Out-of-Focus, Hawaiian and Polajunk Series.
- Hollywood-Dolce & Gabbana, Published 2003 by Assouline. Photograph of Angie Harmon for InStyle magazine.
- Naked, Flowers Exposed, Published in 1997, One hundred of the Worlds most prominent photographers using flowers as an artistic expression. Illustrated image: Australian Wildflower, January 1987, Australia.
- The Book of Perfume, Published in 1995 by Flammarion, Illustrated image: Bending Orchid, August 1987, Paris, France.
- Variations Gitanes, Published in 1992 By Flammarion, Introduction by Christian Caujolle, original image photographed for the exhibition Pages: 15, 86.
- Parade, The Story of Fashion in Australia, Published in 1989 by HarperCollinsPublishers, By Alexandra Joel. Fashion photographs for Harper's Bazaar Australia, Pages: 227, 229, 230, 243, 247, 248, 253, 258–259, 274–275
- L'année de la Mode, Published in 1988 by La Manufacture. Fashion; Angelo Tarlazzi for Vogue Hommes International page: 150

== Exhibitions ==
- June 2019, Mark Arbeit, George Holz, Just Loomis, Three boys from Pasadena – New Work, Helmut Newton Foundation, Berlin, Curated by Matthias Harder
- November 2016, Artist Atelier, COFA Contemporary, Cologne Fine Art
- April 2016, Photogram #9, Art Cologne, Germany
- April 2016, Les Ateliers Paris 1991–2004, Kaune Gallery for Contemporary Photography, Cologne, Germany
- April 2013, Photogram & Polaroid Constructions, Kaune Gallery for Contemporary Photography, Cologne, Germany
- October 2012, Three Boys from Pasadena, Eyeloco Gallery, Antwerp, Belgium
- June 2012, Three Boys from Pasadena, Williamson Gallery, Art Center College of Design, Pasadena, California
- April 2012, Three Boys from Pasadena, Art Cologne, Germany
- March 2012, Three Boys from Pasadena, Kaune Sudendorf Gallery, Cologne, Germany
- December 2010, Three Boys from Pasadena, Clic Gallery, New York
- June 2010, Three Boys from Pasadena, Acte2 Gallery, Paris, France
- June 2009, Three Boys from Pasadena, Helmut Newton Foundation, Berlin, Germany, Curated by June Newton
- May 2003, Flower Power, Group show, Acte2 Gallery, Paris, France
- January 1994, Artist Atelier Series, In & Out-of-Focus series, Hatano Gallery, Honolulu, Hawaii
- March 1991, Flowers & Flou, Center of Photography at Woodstock, New York
- June 1990, Fashion Photography, Studio Daguerre, Paris, France
- April 1989, Images of Illusion, St. Louis, Missouri, Curated by Ethelene Staley & Taki Wise
- March 1985, ERO 85, Festival De L'Erotisme, Paris, France
