= Twelve Inch Club =

EP by A-ha
- Released: 25 August 1986
- Recorded: 1985
- Genre: Synthpop
- Length: 25:58
- Label: Warner-Pioneer Corporation
- Producer: Alan Tarney, Tony Mansfield, A-ha

Twelve Inch Club is the second of four Japan-exclusive EPs by A-ha. Like the other three EPs, it is quite rare due to being only released in Japan. It reached #21 on the Japanese albums chart. Some (if not all) of the first pressing have the title spelt incorrectly on the disc as "Twelve Ihch Club". Tracks 1–3 were included on the 2010 deluxe edition of the album Hunting High and Low (track 1 as (U.S. Mix) and track 3 as a download-only bonus track) and all tracks were included on the 2015 expanded edition of the album Hunting High and Low.

== Track listing ==
1. "Train of Thought" (Steve Thompson Mix) – 7:03
2. "And You Tell Me" (demo version) – 1:55
3. "The Sun Always Shines on T.V." (Steve Thompson Mix) – 8:25
4. "Train of Thought" (dub version) – 8:35

== See also ==
- 45 R.P.M. Club - The first Japanese EP
- Scoundrel Club - The 3rd Japanese EP
- Road Club - The 4th Japanese EP
