= 45 R.P.M. Club =

EP by A-ha
- Released: 25 June 1986
- Recorded: 1985
- Genre: Synthpop
- Length: 22:56
- Label: Warner-Pioneer Corporation
- Producer: Alan Tarney, A-ha

45 R.P.M. Club is the first of four Japan-exclusive EPs by A-ha. Like the other three EPs, it is quite rare due to being only released in Japan. It reached #6 on the Japanese albums chart. Tracks 1 and 2 were included on the 2010 deluxe edition of the album Hunting High and Low (track 1 as a download-only bonus track) and all tracks were included on the 2015 expanded edition of the album Hunting High and Low.

== Track listing ==
No.	Title	Length
1.	"The Sun Always Shines on T.V." (extended version)	8:25
2.	"Driftwood"	3:06
3.	"Take On Me" (extended version)	4:47
4.	"The Sun Always Shines on T.V." (instrumental)	6:38

== Personnel ==
- Morten Harket – vocals
- Magne Furuholmen – keyboards
- Pål Waaktaar – guitars

== See also ==
- Twelve Inch Club - The 2nd Japanese EP
- Scoundrel Club - The 3rd Japanese EP
- Road Club - The 4th Japanese EP
