= Scoundrel Club =

EP by A-ha
- Released: 25 May 1987
- Recorded: 1985–87 (Track 2 was "Recorded in London on the A-ha tour 19th January 1987")
- Genre: Synthpop
- Length: 29:25
- Label: Warner-Pioneer Corporation
- Producer: Alan Tarney, Magne Furuholmen & Pal Waaktaar, Tony Mansfield

Scoundrel Club is the third of four Japan-exclusive EPs by A-ha. Like the other three EPs, it is quite rare due to being only released in Japan. It reached #29 on the Japanese albums chart.also there was released Scoundrel Club Picture which it reached #27. Tracks 1–4 were included on the 2010 deluxe edition of the album Scoundrel Days (track 3 as a download-only bonus track). Track 5 was included on the 2010 deluxe edition of the album Hunting High and Low and the 2015 expanded edition of the album Hunting High and Low.

== Track listing ==
1. "Cry Wolf" (extended version) – 8:14
2. "We're Looking for the Whales" (live version) – 3:50
3. "I've Been Losing You" (dub) – 4:29
4. "Manhattan Skyline" (extended remix) – 6:49
5. "Hunting High and Low" (extended remix) – 6:01

== See also ==
- 45 R.P.M. Club - The first Japanese EP
- Twelve Inch Club - The 2nd Japanese EP
- Road Club - The 4th Japanese EP
