= Road Club =

EP by A-ha
- Released: 25 August 1988
- Recorded: 1985–88
- Genre: Synthpop
- Length: 25:47
- Label: Warner-Pioneer Corporation
- Producer: Alan Tarney, Tony Mansfield, A-ha

Road Club is the last of four Japan-exclusive EPs by A-ha. Like the other three EPs, it is quite rare due to being only released in Japan.It reached #42 on the Japanese albums chart. Tracks 1 & 3 were included on the 2015 deluxe edition of the album Stay on These Roads. Track 4 was included on the 2010 deluxe edition of the album Hunting High and Low. Tracks 2 and 4 were included on the 2015 expanded edition of the album Hunting High and Low.

== Track listing ==
1. "The Blood That Moves the Body" (extended version) – 5:26
2. "Take On Me" (extended version) – 4:51
3. "Stay on These Roads" (extended version) – 6:14
4. "Hunting High and Low" (extended remix) – 6:03
5. "Soft Rains of April" (original mix) – 3:15

== See also ==
- 45 R.P.M. Club - The first Japanese EP
- Twelve Inch Club - The 2nd Japanese EP
- Scoundrel Club - The 3rd Japanese EP
