= De Sarthe Gallery =

Coordinates: 22.2491°N 114.1682°E

DE SARTHE
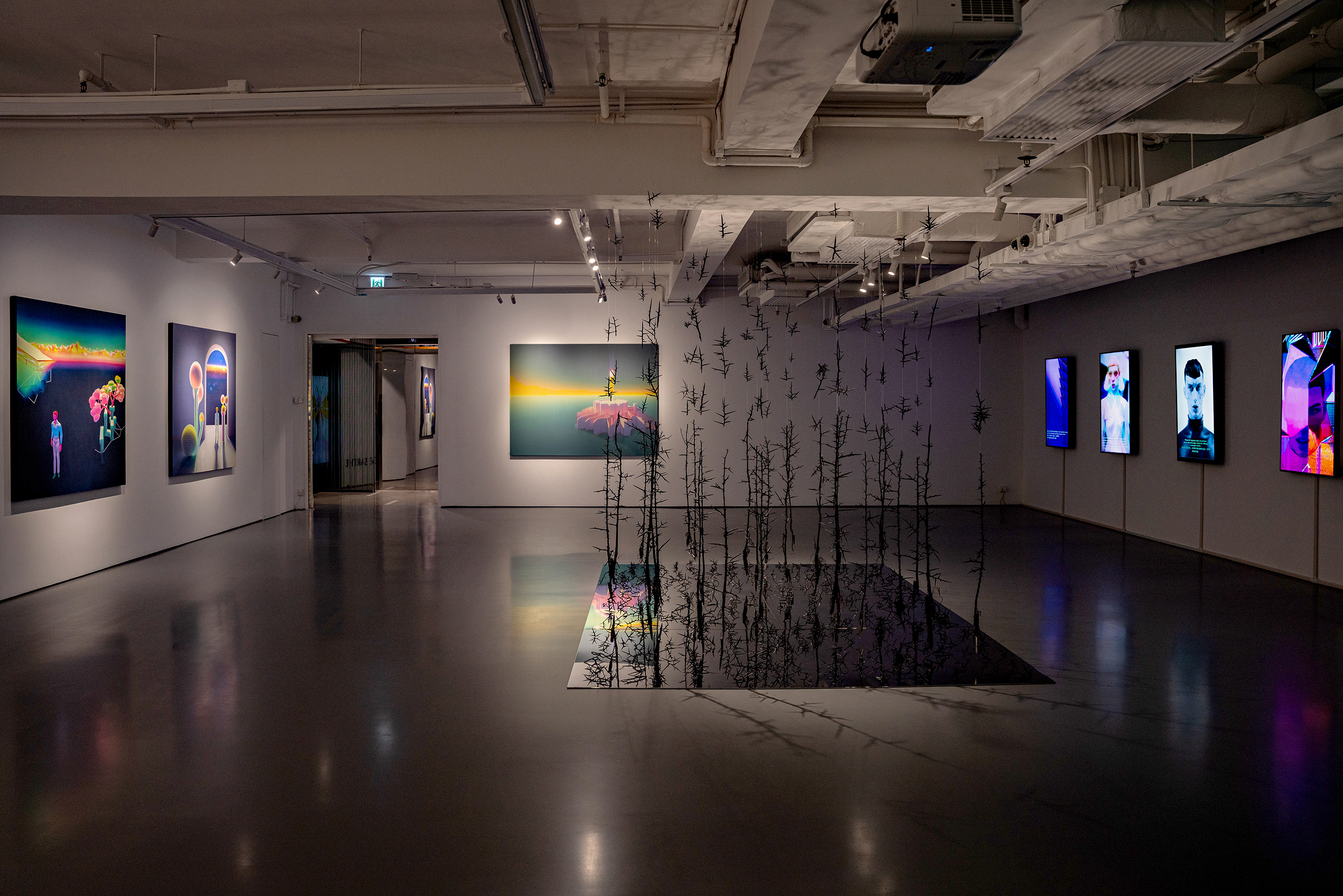
- DE SARTHE, Hong Kong
- Established: 1977
- Location: Hong Kong, Scottsdale
- Type: Art Gallery
- Founder: Pascal de Sarthe
- Website: desarthe.com

DE SARTHE (Traditional Chinese: 德薩畫廊; Simplified Chinese: 德萨画廊) is a contemporary art gallery with spaces in Hong Kong and Scottsdale, Arizona. The gallery's contemporary art program exhibits and promotes emerging artists from Asia, and its advisory focuses on 19th and 20th century master paintings and sculptures.

== History ==
Founded by the current owner Pascal de Sarthe and his wife Sylvie de Sarthe, the gallery first opened in 1977 in Paris, France. The business moved to the United States in 1981, where it operated in San Francisco (1981-1990), Los Angeles (1990-1994), then Scottsdale (1994-2009). At the time, the gallery dealt mainly in secondary market Eastern and Western contemporary art.

In 2010, the gallery relocated to Hong Kong, opening a space on Duddell Street in the Central area (2010-2016). It later moved to the city's southern district, Wong Chuk Hang (2017-present), simultaneously expanding its contemporary art program. In 2014, the gallery opened and operated a space in the Caochangdi district in Beijing, until it received an eviction notice from the government in 2018.

In 2022, the founder's son Vincent de Sarthe reopened a new location in Scottsdale.

== Gallery Program ==
=== Contemporary Art ===
==== Artists ====
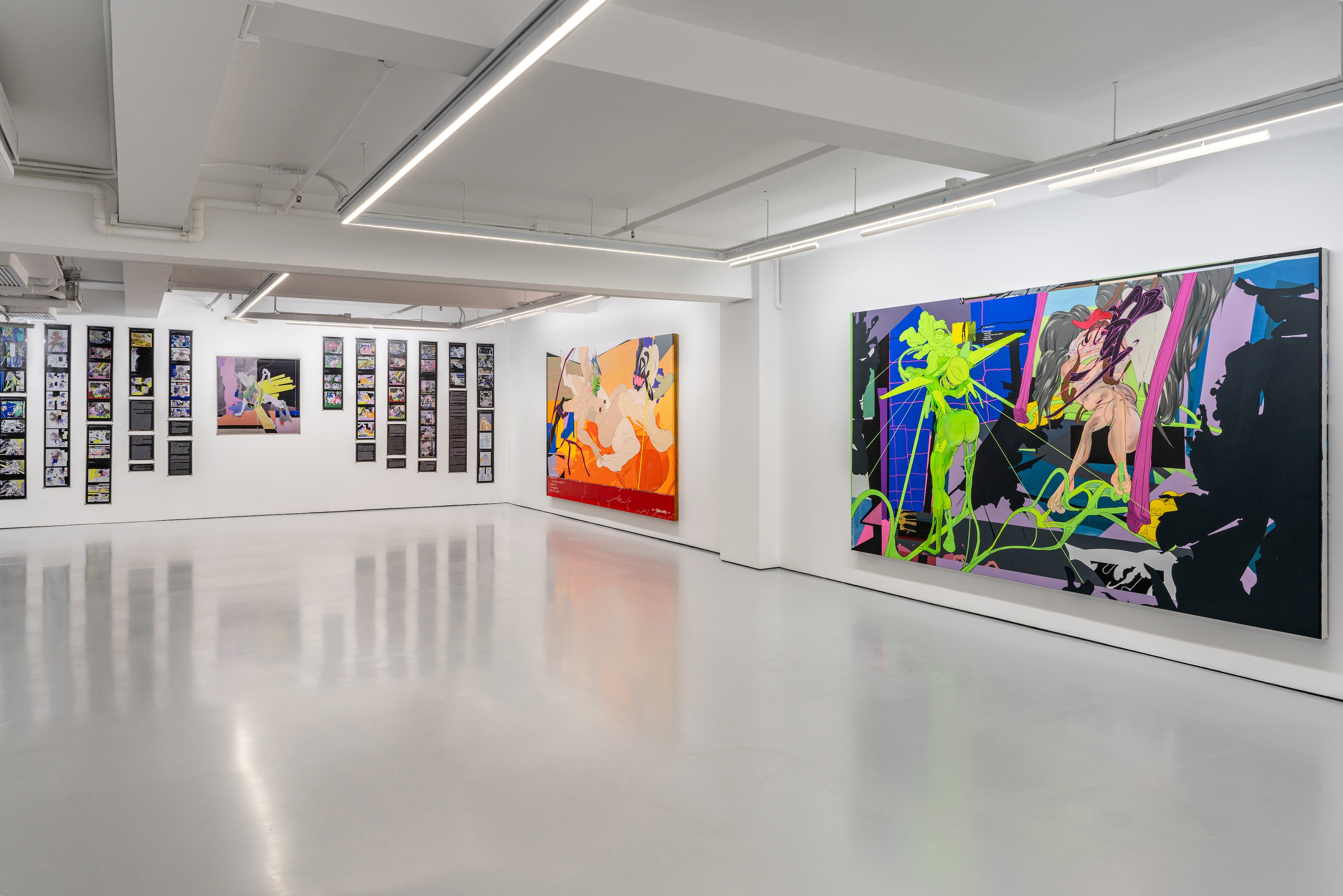
Zhong Wei's solo exhibition 'Weight Drifting' at DE SARTHE, Hong Kong (2023). Photo courtesy of the gallery.

DE SARTHE exhibits works that reflect upon the complex and permeating implications of 21st century technology, representing creative practices that navigate and traverse the virtual realms colliding into reality today. Currently, the gallery represents a roster of contemporary Asian artists belonging to the generation born between 1970s-1990s, including Chan Ka Kiu, Lazarus Chan, Mitchell F. Chan, Lin Jingjing, Lov-Lov, Eugene Lun, Lu Xinjian, Mak2, Ma Sibo, Caison Wang, Wang Xin, Zhong Wei, and Zhou Wendou.

==== de Sarthe Artist Residency (deSAR) ====
Since 2017, the gallery has also run an annual summer residency program ("deSAR"), during which a Hong Kong-based artist is invited to use the gallery's Wong Chuk Hang space as an open studio for two months. The yearly program concludes with a short exhibition at the end of summer, of works created over the course of the residency.

==== deSAR Past Residents ====
Year	Artist	Residency Period	Exhibition Title
2017	Andrew Luk	12 July - 9 September	Practice
2018	Christopher K. Ho (curated by Forever & Today)	17 July - 31 August	CX888
2019	Wing Po So	17 July - 7 September	From the Body to the Body Through the Body
2020	Mark Chung	15 July - 4 September	Wheezing
2021	Chen Pin Tao	13 July - 17 September	Violin Makers and Seamstresses I: The Caveman, The Literati, The Iconoclast
2022	Eugene Lun	9 July - 9 September	The Forbidden Happiness
2023	Chan Ka Kiu	28 June - 8 September	Late to the Party
2024	Liao Jiaming	29 June - 30 August	Melting Suns on the Screen
2026	Lau Wai	8 July - 4 September	After Intelligence

=== Advisory ===
Additionally, the gallery works in the secondary market for European and Asian modernist artists such as Zao Wou-ki, Chu Teh-Chun, Pablo Picasso, Mark Rothko, Joan Miro, Alexander Calder, Gerhard Richter, Andy Warhol, Yves Klein, Auguste Rodin, and Atsuko Tanaka, among others.

=== Art Fairs ===
Since 2015, the gallery has taken part in international art fairs including Art Basel Hong Kong, West Bund Art & Design, Taipei Dangdai, The Armory Show , Frieze Seoul and more.

== Notable Projects ==
=== Lu Yang: DOKU the Creator (2025) ===
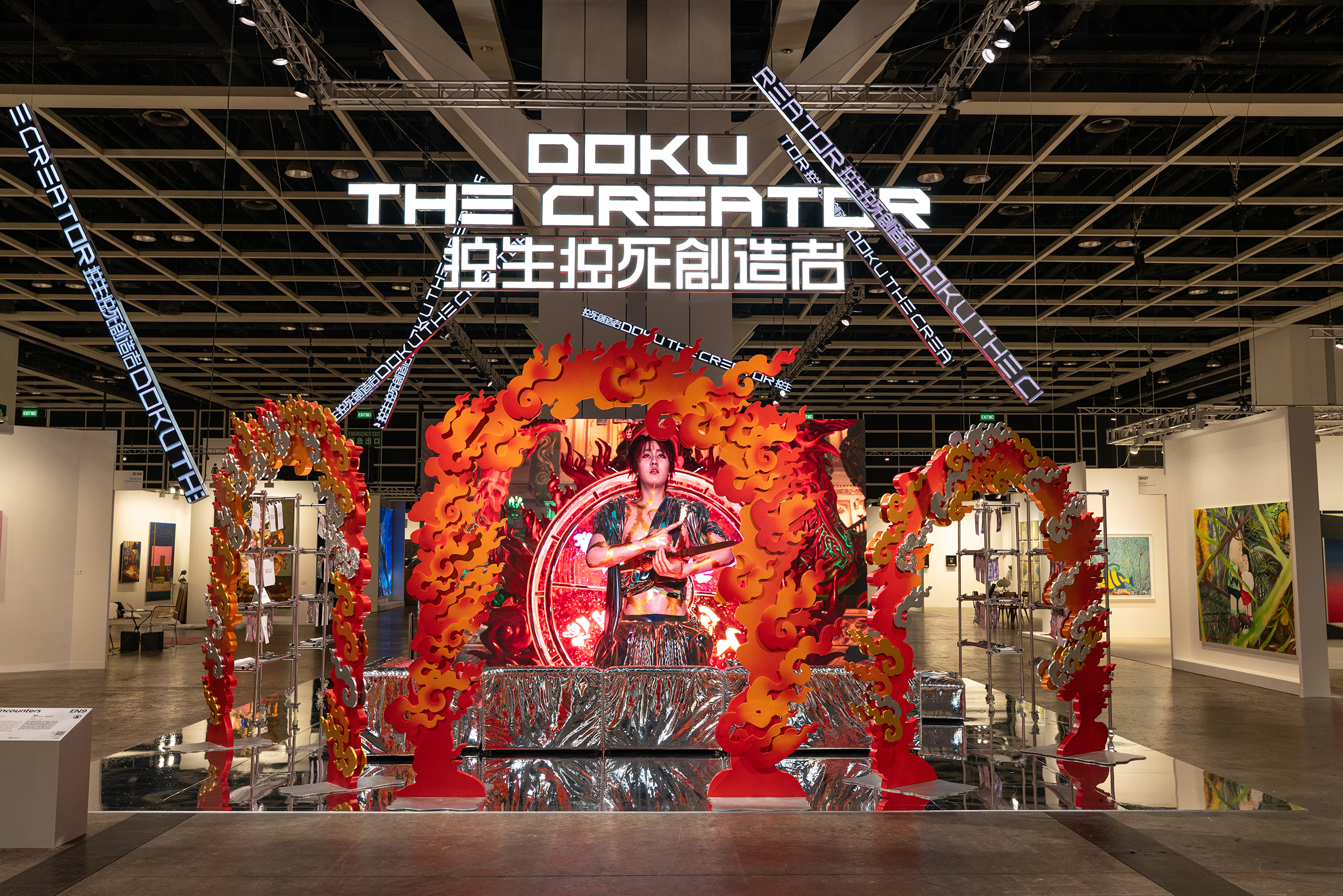
Lu Yang's DOKU the Creator at Art Basel Hong Kong 2025.

In the 2025 edition of Art Basel Hong Kong, the gallery returned to the fair's Encounters sector with an interactive installation by Tokyo-based artist Lu Yang, presented in collaboration with COMA, Sydney, Australia. The installation takes the form of a pop-up store within an art fair, centered around the artist's most recently created video work and selling 108 blind boxes containing unique digital artworks by the artist's digital persona DOKU.

=== Bernar Venet: Beyond Concept and Matter at Phoenix Center, Beijing (2024-2025) and Guangdong Museum of Art, Guangzhou (2025) ===
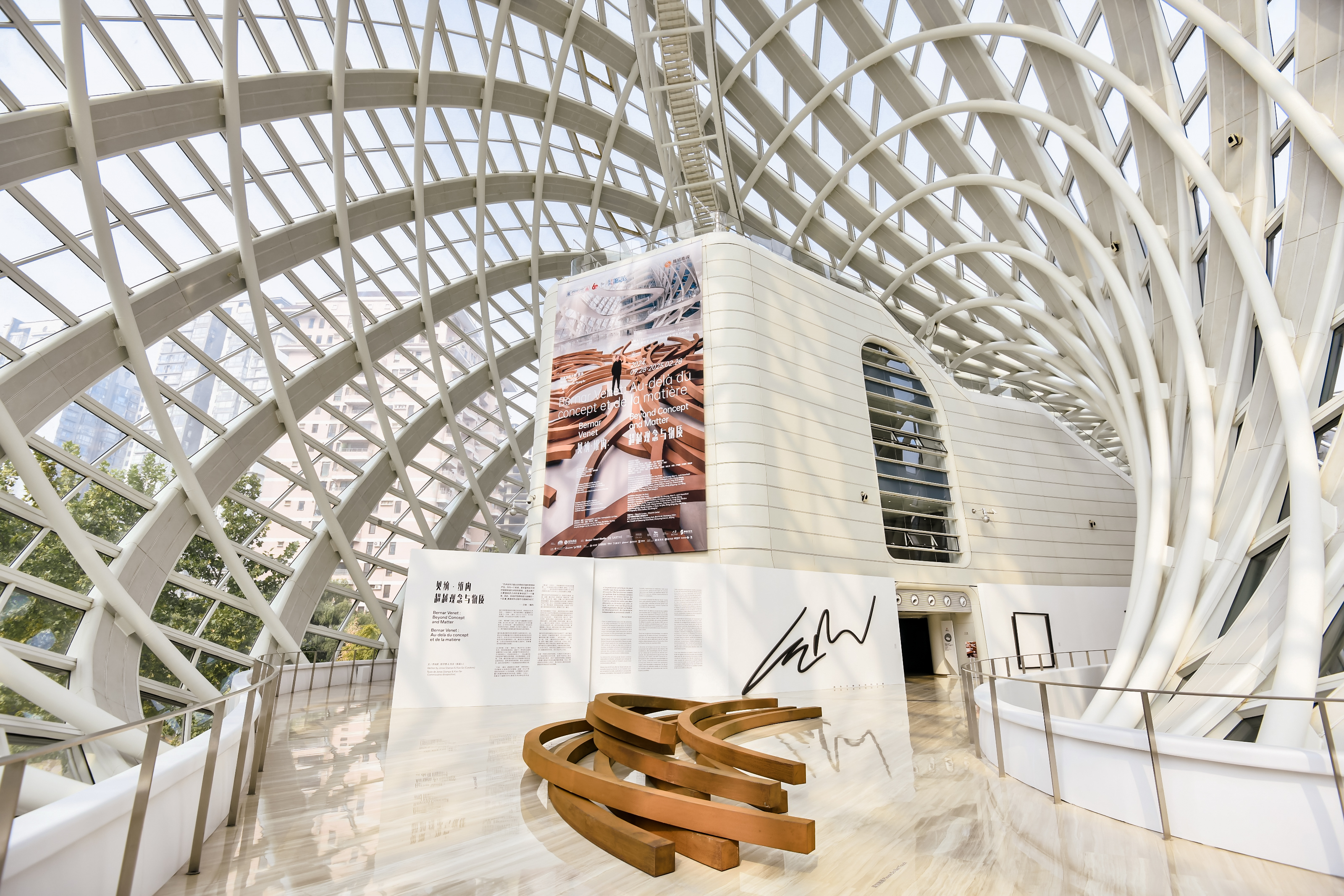
Bernar Venet Retrospective at Phoenix Center, Beijing.

In 2024 and 2025, in partnership with DE SARTHE and the artist's studio, a major retrospective exhibition was hosted for French artist Bernar Venet, Bernar Venet: Au-delà du concept et de la matièr at the Phoenix Center in Beijing, featuring almost 180 works that the artist made across his career including paintings, drawings, sculptures, photography, sound, film, and performances.

The exhibition later travelled to the Guangdong Museum of Art, Guangzhou China.

An 18-meter sculpture titled Convergence: 52.5° Arc x 14 was gifted to China by the artist to honor 60 years of Sino-French diplomatic relations. This prompted the artist to have a private conversation with French President Emmanuel Macron and Chinese President Xi Jinping in December 2025.

=== Mak2: Copy of Copy of Copy of Copy (2024) ===
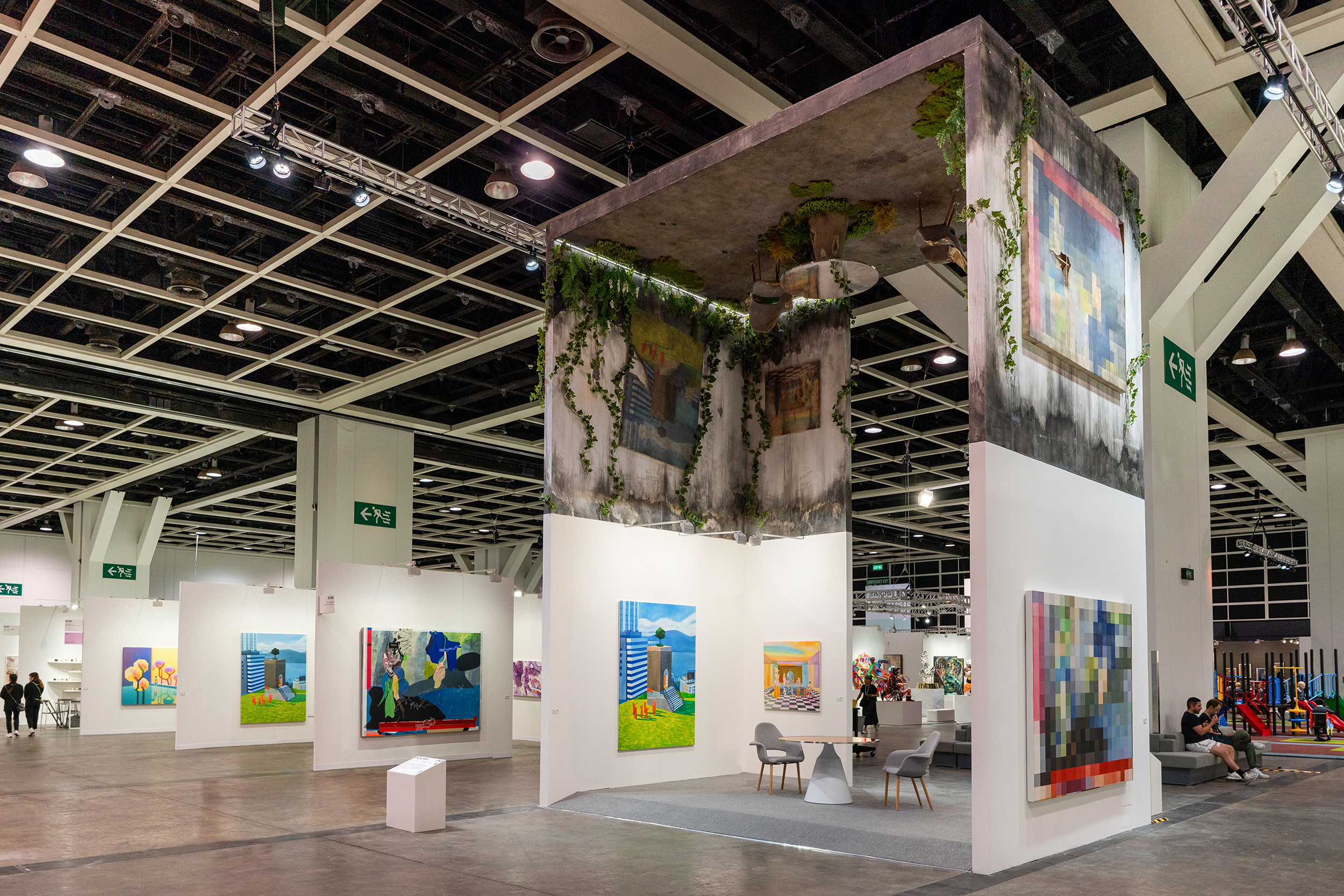
Mak2's Copy of Copy of Copy of Copy on view at Art Basel Hong Kong 2024. Photo courtesy of the gallery.

In the 2024 edition of Art Basel Hong Kong, the gallery presented a 7.5-meter-tall, site-specific installation by Hong Kong-based artist Mak2 as part of the fair's Encounters sector. The installation, which consists of two replicas of DE SARTHE's booth connected top to top, dissects "the cyclicality of copying in the evolution of creation" and explores the layered stages of simulation folded into reality.

The presentation was well-received by press and was covered by local as well as international media including ArtAsiaPacific, Artnet, Tatler Asia, CNN Style, TimeOut, High Snobiety, RTHK, China Daily, Singtao, CNBC, and more.

The installation and gallery also became a social media phenomenon during the week of the fair and was ranked first in social media engagement by The Owner.

=== Live Performance by Bernar Venet in collaboration with Sotheby's and amfAR (2019) ===
In 2019, the gallery organized a live performance by French artist Bernar Venet in Hong Kong in collaboration with Sotheby's and amfAR. The event marked the first time that an auction house has hosted an artist to create during a live art event and then to exhibited the newly created piece for an upcoming auction. Proceeds from the subsequent sale were donated to amfAR in support of the global fight against aids and the prevention of HIV.

=== Robert Rauschenberg Exhibition in Hong Kong (2016) ===
In 2016, the gallery presented a solo exhibition by American artist Robert Rauschenberg at its Central space, featuring six significant works from different series spanning from 1968-2005.

=== Pioneers of Modern Chinese Painting in Paris (2014) ===
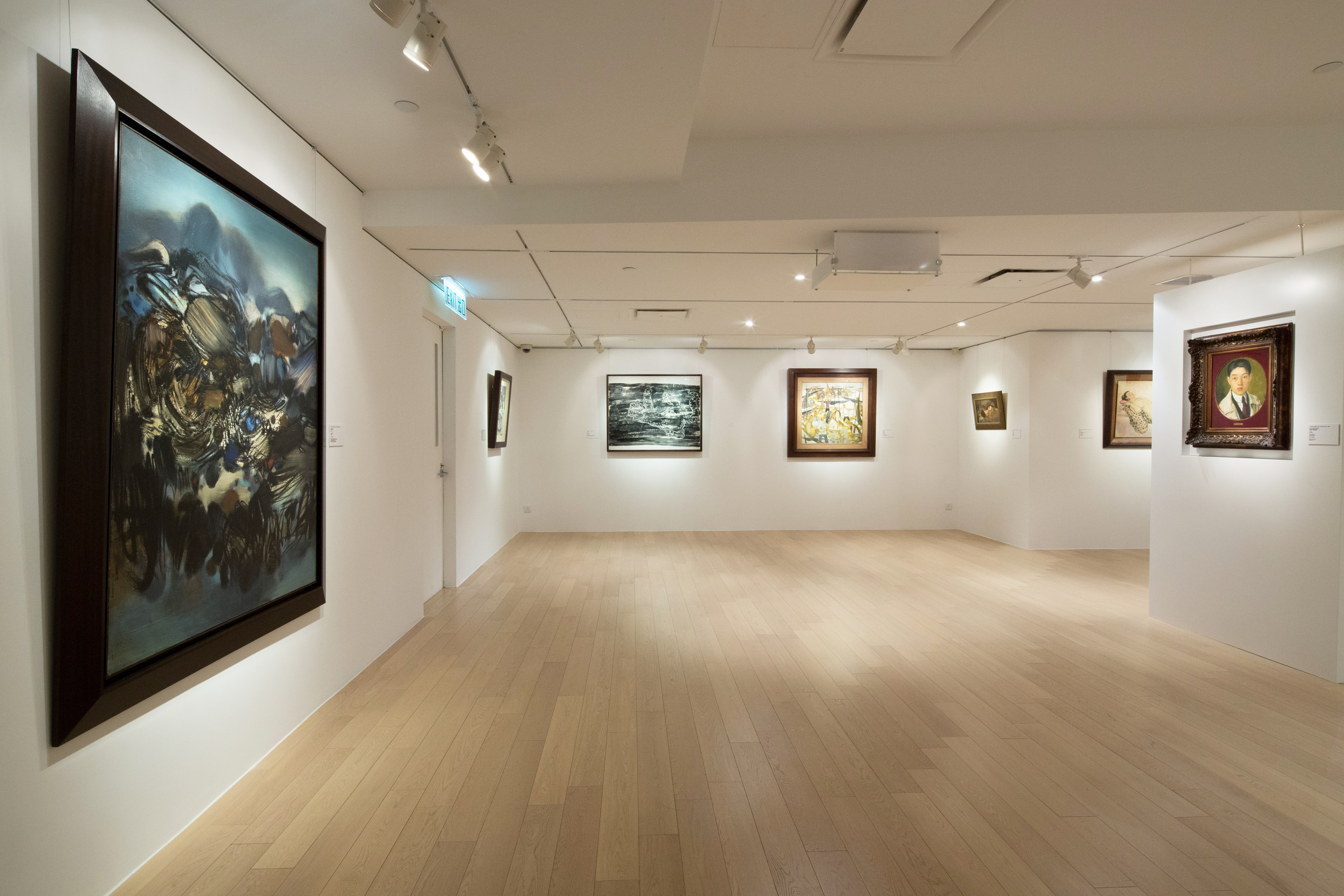
Installation view of Pioneers of Modern Chinese Painting in Paris

In 2014, the gallery presented a rare collection of masterpieces from first and second generations of Chinese artists, including Chu Teh-Chun, Lin Fengmian, Pan Yuliang, Sanyu, T'ang Haywen, Wu Dayu, Wu Guanzhong, Wu Zouren, Xiong Bingming, Xu Beihong, Yun Gee, and Zao Wou-Ki. The exhibition featured 15 works from Chinese artists who moved to, or worked temporarily, in Paris from 1919 onwards, demonstrating the measured reconciliation of Chinese and European aesthetics. The exhibition catalogue includes a text written by Chinese scholar Professor Dr. Lao Zhu (Zhu Qingsheng).

=== Auguste Rodin: Bronzes, Exceptional Early Casts (2013) ===
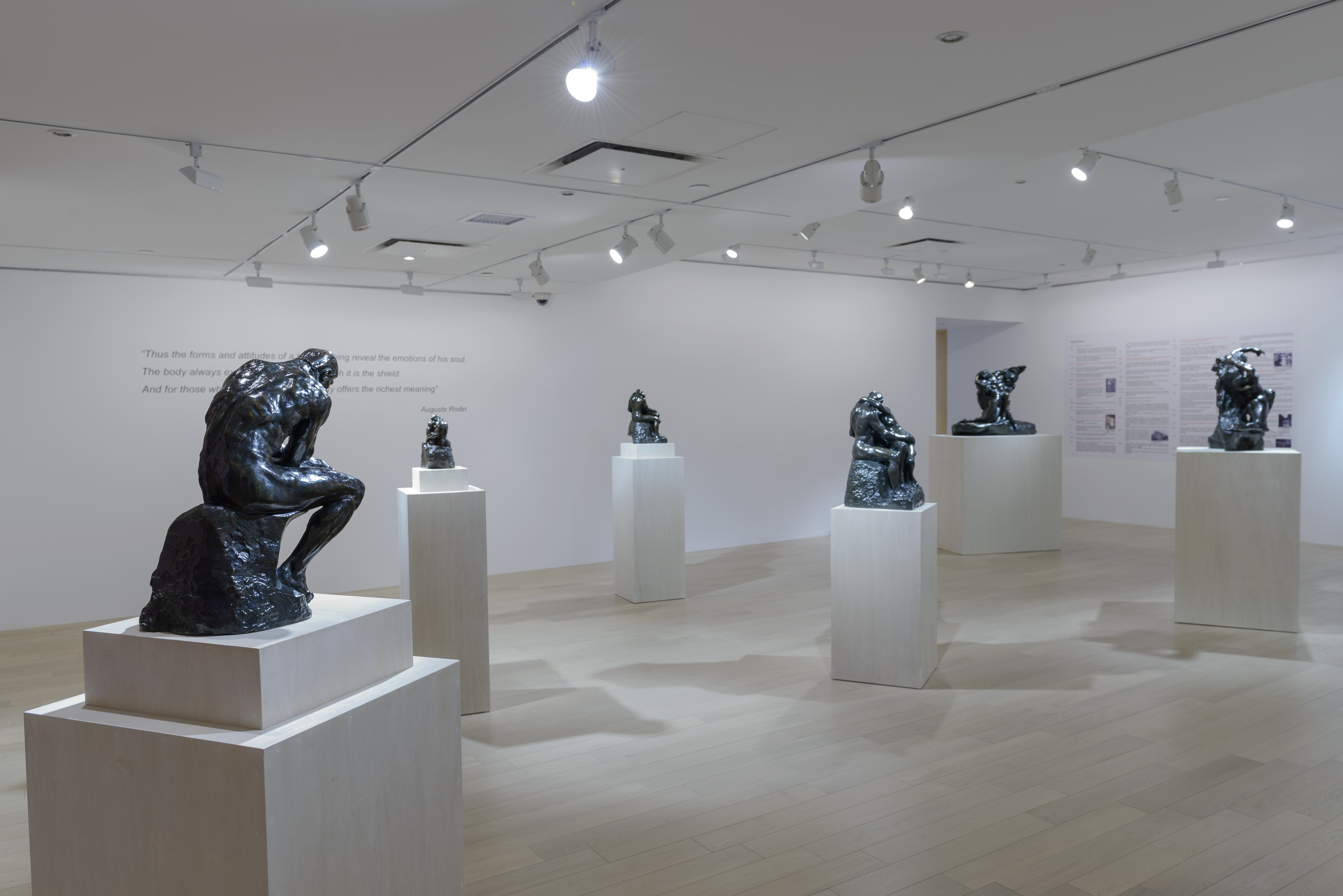
Installation view of Rodin: Bronzes, Exceptional Early Casts

In 2013, the gallery presented a major collection of sculptures by world renowned French sculptor, Auguste Rodin, also known as the “father or modern sculpture”. The gallery hosted the exhibition which features notable bronze sculptures that were cast during the artist’s lifetime, including works such as Le Penseur (The Thinker), Le Baiser (The Kiss), and Eternal Printemps (Eternal Springtime).

=== Bernar Venet at Hong Kong Cultural Centre & Museum of Art Piazzas (2012) ===
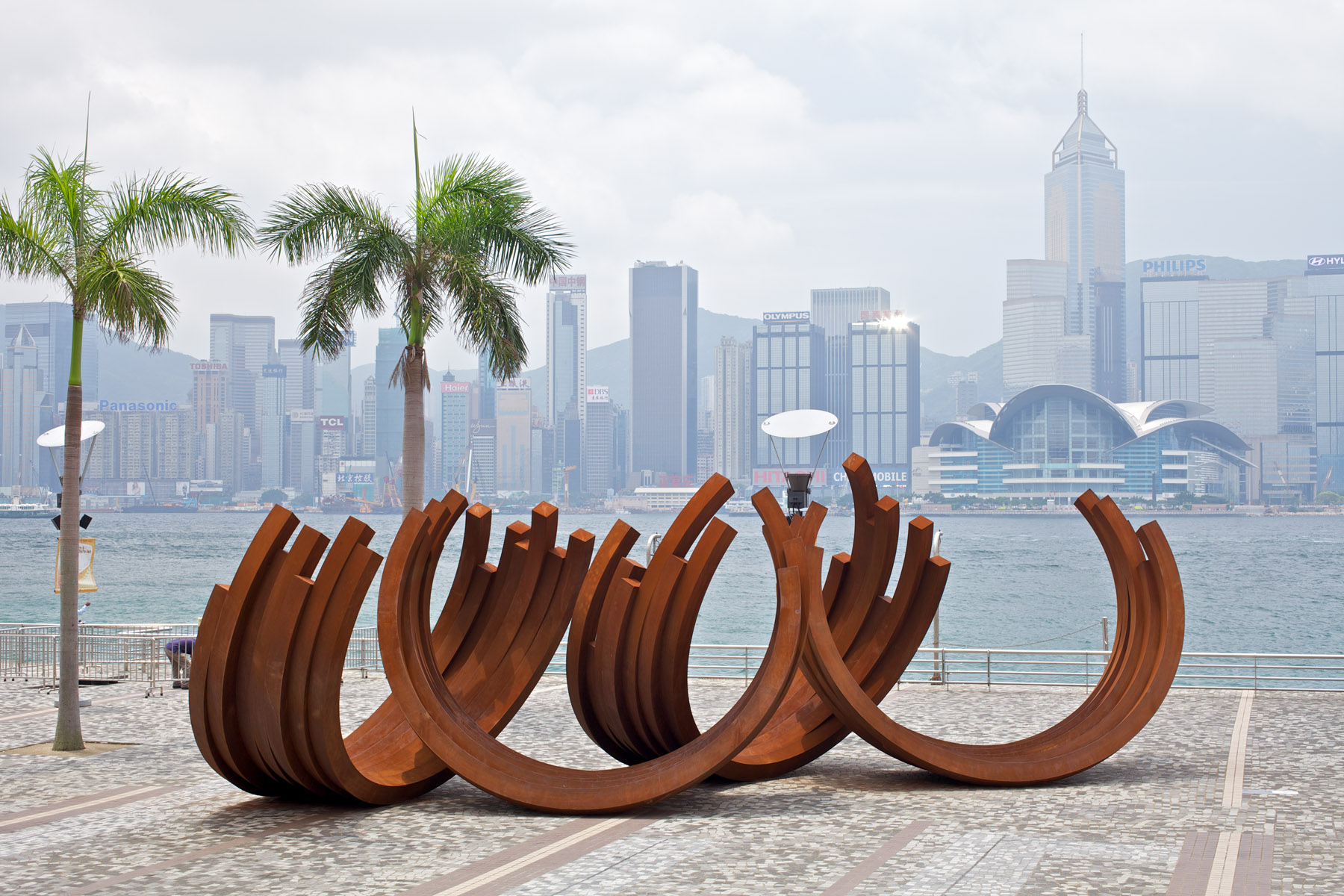
Bernar Venet's 219.5⁰ Arc x 28 in Hong Kong, measuring 13m x 4m x 5m

In 2012, DE SARTHE organized and sponsored a presentation of 7 large-scale steel sculptures by Bernar Venet, exhibited in the piazzas adjacent to Hong Kong Cultural Centre and Hong Kong Museum of Art. Hosted in collaboration with French May, the exhibition was the artist's first appearance in Hong Kong since 1995 and featured several works that he created for an exhibition at Château de Versailles in 2011.

=== Keith Haring Public Sculptures in Taipei, Taiwan (2011) ===
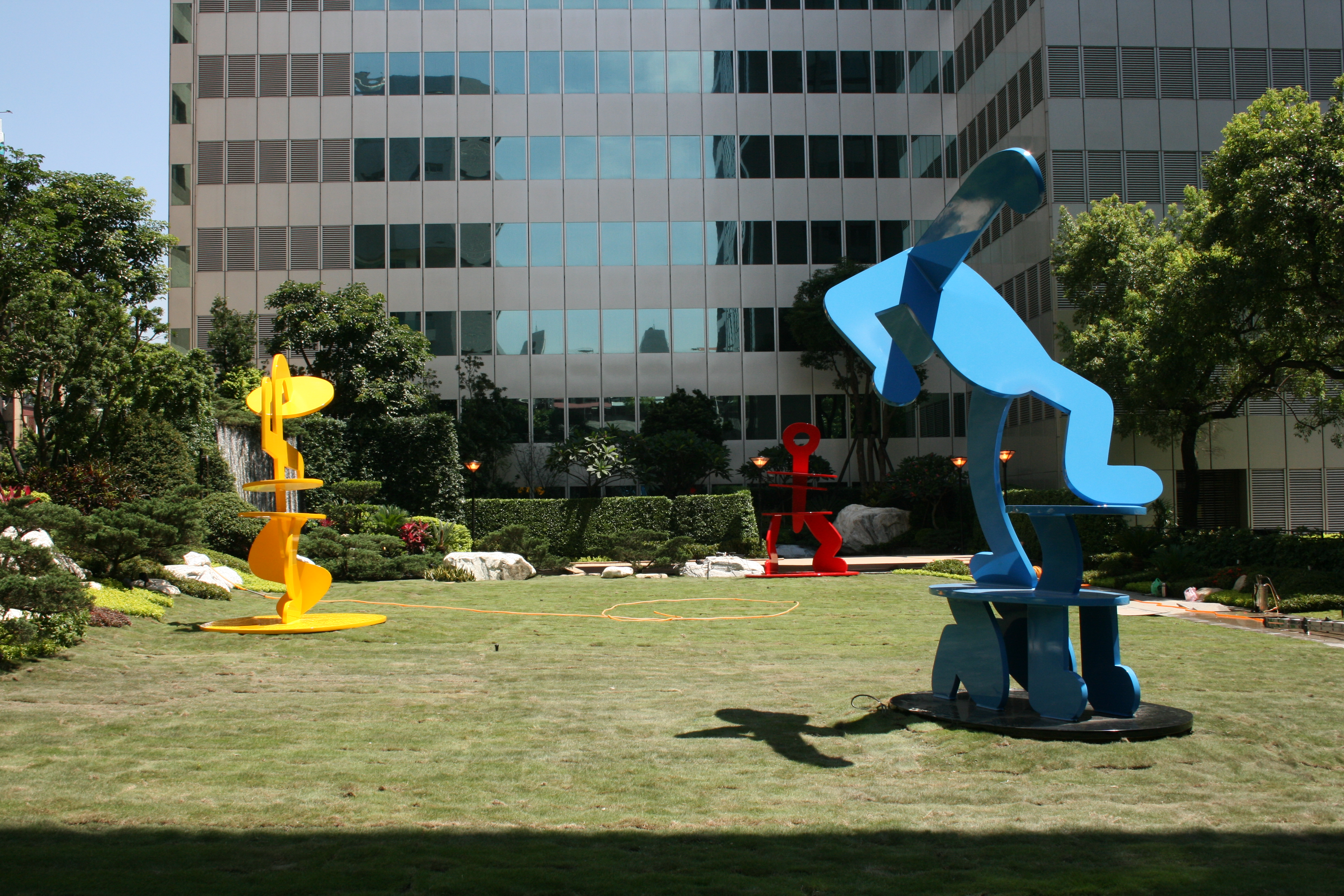
Keith Haring Sculptures at Yuanta Financial Holdings Taipei, Taiwan. ©Estate of Keith Haring

In 2011, the gallery's advisory placed three large-scale Keith Haring sculptures in the public area outside Yuanta Financial Holdings in Taipei.

=== Robert Indiana Public Sculpture at Taipei 101 (2004) ===
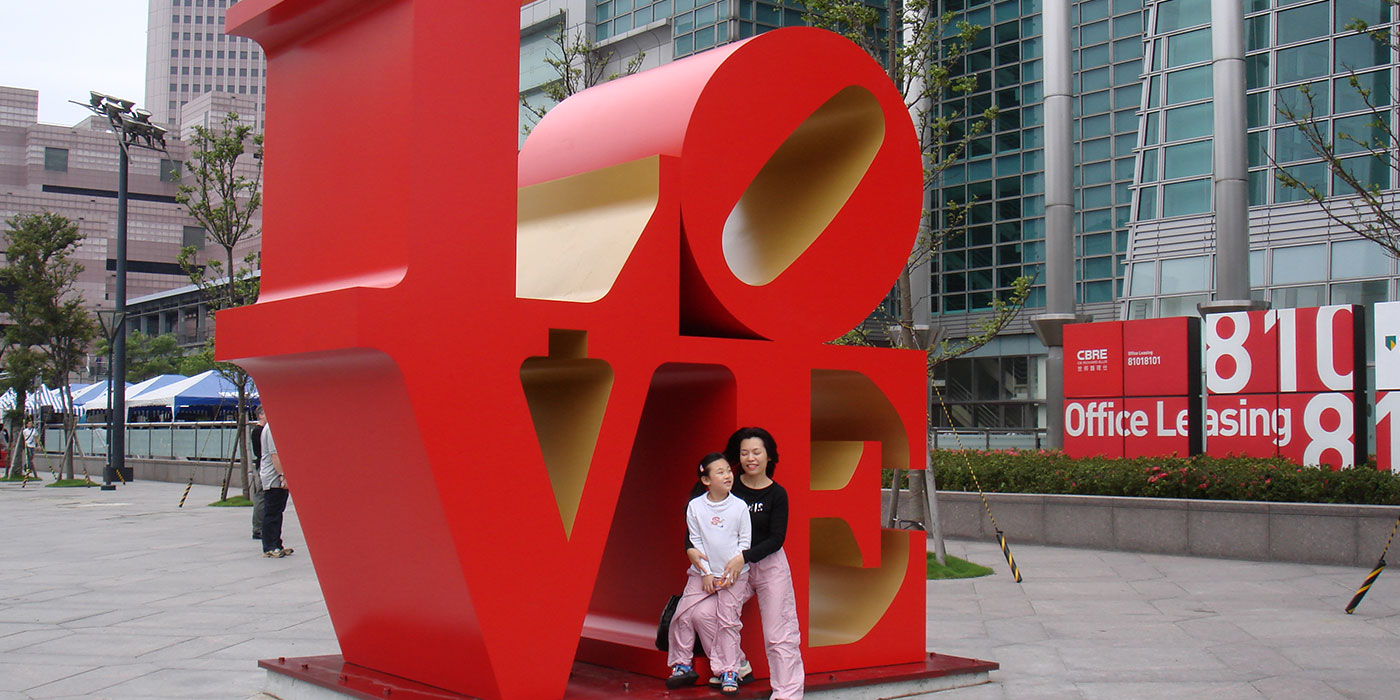
Robert Indiana 'LOVE' at Taipei 101, Taiwan ©Robert Indiana

In 2004, the gallery placed Robert Indiana's iconic Love sculpture in front of Taipei 101 in Taiwan. Measuring 3.6m tall, 3.6m wide, and 1.8m thick, the bright red sculpture is now a tourist attraction of the city.

=== Robert Indiana Exhibition at Shanghai Art Museum (2002) ===
American artist Robert Indiana had his first solo exhibition in China at Shanghai Art Museum. The exhibition was organized in a collaboration between the gallery's founder Pascal de Sarthe and Morgan Art Foundation Ltd. The show was a broad survey of Indiana's career, featuring over 80 works comprising sculptures, paintings, and serigraphs.

== Associations ==
The gallery is a member of the Hong Kong Art Gallery Association and participates in their monthly Southside Saturday program.

== Recognition ==
Gallery founder Pascal de Sarthe was listed as one of the 'Power 100' by Art+Auction Magazine in 2012.

The gallery was among the 500 best galleries in the world listed by Modern Painters in 2013.

The gallery was awarded '"Best Art Gallery of The Year" in Asia' by CANS Magazine in 2017, Chinese Art News.

Gallery founder Pascal de Sarthe was featured in the video 'The Rise of the Mobile Connoisseur', on BBC.com.

In 2024, the gallery was interviewed and featured in CNBC's "The Art of Appreciation" along with Sotheby's and Art Basel Hong Kong.
