= Mak2 =

Hong-Kong based artist

- Born: Mak Ying Tung; 1989 (age 36–37); Hong Kong
- Education: School of Creative Media, City University of Hong Kong

Mak2 (simplified Chinese: 麦影彤二; traditional Chinese: 麥影彤二) is a Hong Kong artist, whose practice spans across installations, paintings, drawings, video work, YouTube videos, stand-up comedy routines, and video games. Her works are characterized by social commentary delivered through relatable humor.

== Early life and education ==
Mak2 was born in 1989 in Hong Kong. She received her BA degree from the School of Creative Media, City University of Hong Kong.

Born Mak Ying Tung, the artist began creating work under the alias of "Mak Ying Tung 2" after a chance encounter with a Feng Shui master on Temple Street in 2017 who told her she needed 2 more strokes in her name. In 2021, she shortened the name to "Mak2" for ease of recognition, and has since exhibited at various galleries and institutions worldwide.

== Notable works ==
=== You Better Watch Out (2017) ===
You Better Watch Out is an interactive installation by Mak2 composed of a giant snow globe circulating colorful balls and printed QR codes that link viewers to themselves captured on CCTV when scanned on their phones. The artwork was included in the exhibition .com/.cn co-presented by MoMA PS1 and K11 Art Foundation.

=== Home Sweet Home (2019-) ===
One of Mak2's most widely-exhibited body of works is Home Sweet Home, a series of painted triptychs that were first conceived in 2019 for an exhibition of the same name at DE SARTHE. Intended as conceptual art, the works are composed by Mak2 using the life simulation game The Sims, but then each part of the triptych is crafted by a different painter hired from the Chinese e-commerce platform Taobao.

Since its conception, the series has evolved to address varied social and philosophical issues. The most prominent sub-series include Home Sweet Home: Feng Shui Painting (2021), Home Sweet Home: Love Pool (2022), Home From Home (2024-) which includes the added element of AI generation, and Home Sweet Home Backyard (2025-) which includes an original video game by Mak2 as part of the artwork.

Mak's Home Sweet Home series have been exhibited internationally in Shanghai, Berlin, Taipei, Singapore, Seoul, and more.

=== Hong Kong's Next Top Artist (2023) ===
Mak2's Hong Kong's Next Top Artist is a video series/mockumentary created during a three-month artist residency program initiated by West Kowloon Cultural District. The program was developed as part of SerendiCity. A limited series of 5 episodes, the web-series follows Mak2 as she invites different parties from the arts sector, including artists, curators, professionals, and gallerists to turn an amateur artist into the city's next top artist.

=== Copy of Copy of Copy of Copy (2024) ===
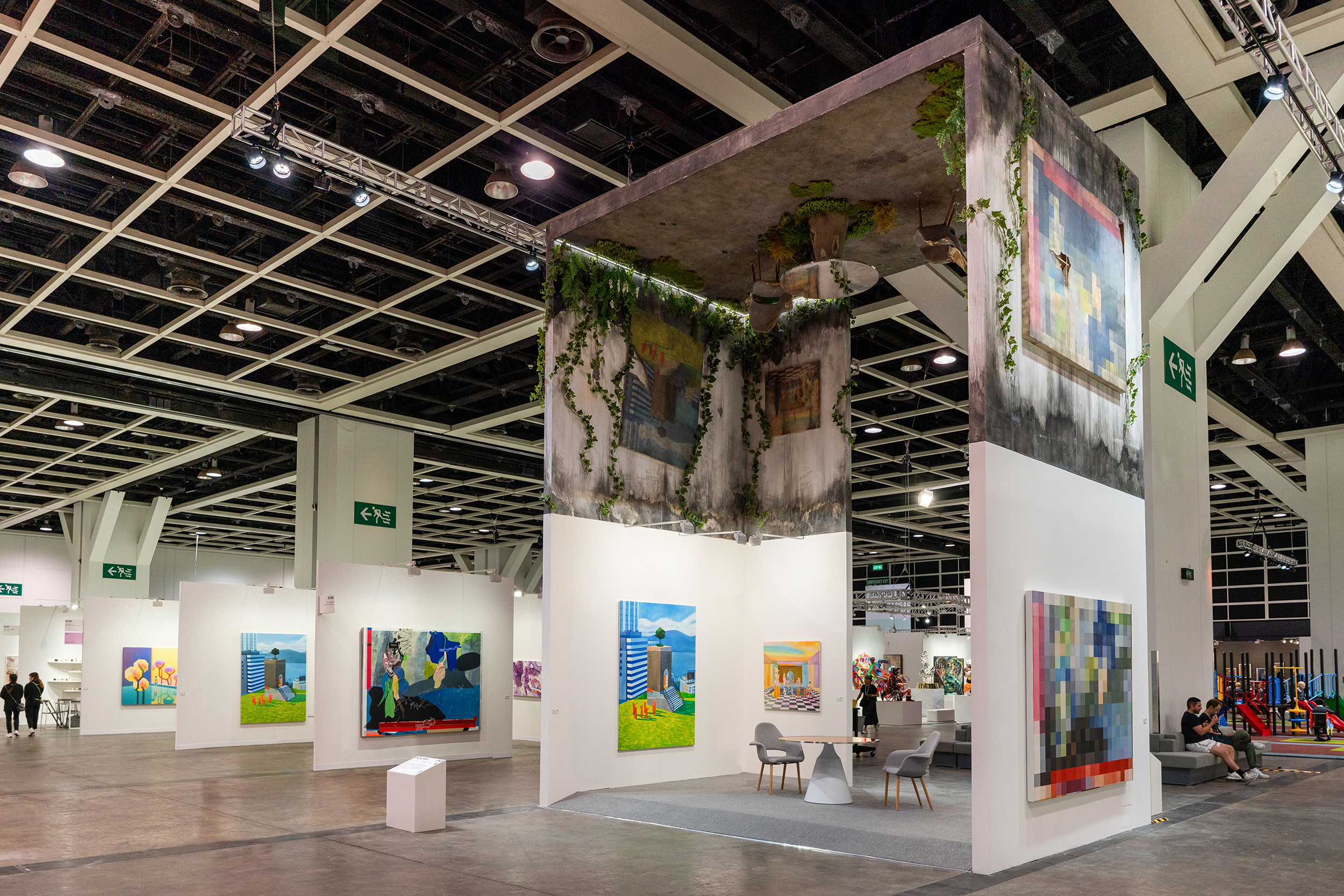
Mak2's Copy of Copy of Copy of Copy at Art Basel Hong Kong 2024

Copy of Copy of Copy of Copy is a 7.5-meter-tall installation artwork by Mak2 exhibited at the 2024 edition of Art Basel Hong Kong. Created for the fair's Encounters sector, the artwork comprises two replica fair booths stacked top-to-top, forming a monumental structure from standardized elements taken from its surroundings. Duplicating her own original artworks presented in the neighboring booth, the installation dissects "the cyclicality of copying in the evolution of creation" and explores the layered stages of simulation folded into reality.

=== Sweet Home Invasion (2024) ===
In 2024, Mak2 was selected as one of two artists to present an artwork at Art Basel Miami Beach as part of the Hong Kong Tourism Board's partnership with Art Basel. Her video artwork Sweet Home Invasion "reimagines an alternative version of the fair in which every booth shows only her work"

== Recognitions and Awards ==
2022 - Prestige 40 Under 40

2020 - The Artsy Vanguard
