= Love Is Reason =

Single by A-ha

from the album Hunting High and Low
- B-side: "I Dream Myself Alive" (Norway); "Take On Me" (Philippines)
- Released: 1 April 1985 (Norway)
- Recorded: 1985
- Genre: Synth-pop
- Length: 3:04 (album version)
- Label: Warner Bros.
- Songwriters: Pål Waaktaar; Magne Furuholmen
- Producer: John Ratcliff

A-ha singles chronology
"Take On Me" (1984)	"Love Is Reason" (1985)	"The Sun Always Shines on T.V." (1985)

"Love Is Reason" is a song by the Norwegian synth-pop band A-ha. It was released as a single in 1985 in Norway and the Philippines from their debut studio album Hunting High and Low. In the UK, it was released as the B-side of "Take On Me".
