= Sumo (book) =

German book series

- First edition cover
- Author: Helmut Newton
- Language: English
- Genre: Photography
- Published: 1999, Cologne
- Publisher: Taschen
- Publication place: Germany
- Media type: Print (hardback)
- Pages: 464 (1999 edition)
- ISBN: 3822863947

SUMO is a book series by publishing house TASCHEN, so named due to their size.

== History ==
The first SUMO was written by German-Australian photographer Helmut Newton. The book is a monograph that showcases his work in fashion and celebrity photography. Featured portraits include Catherine Deneuve, Nicolas Cage and Mickey Rourke. The book is credited with changing the fortunes of Taschen.

It was initially released as a limited edition of 10,000 copies in 1999, selling for $1,500. The first run was numbered and signed by Newton. In keeping with its title, the book weighed over 30 kilograms (66 lb) and measured 50 by 70 centimetres (20 in × 28 in). Owing to the size and weight of the book, a bespoke stand was designed by Phillipe Starck to support it. The first copy of the book was signed by 80 of the celebrities featured in it. This was subsequently sold at auction in Berlin on 6 August 2000 for $430,000, becoming the biggest and most expensive book produced in the 20th century.

A subsequent edition, edited by Newton's widow June, was released in September 2009. Although oversized, it was much smaller, measuring about 12 by 17 inches. This edition also came with a perspex stand for display.

== Other SUMO titles ==
Other books belonging to the SUMO series include:

- The Rolling Stones
- Annie Leibovitz
- GOAT: GREATEST OF ALL TIME: A TRIBUTE TO MUHAMMAD ALI
- Sebastião Salgado. GENESIS
- David Hockney: A Bigger Book
- The David Bailey SUMO
