= Mitchell F. Chan =

- Born: 1982 (age 43–44); Canada
- Education: School of the Art Institute of Chicago (MFA, 2011)
- Known for: Digital Zones of Immaterial Pictorial Sensibility, The Boys of Summer, Zantar
- Movement: Conceptual art, digital art
- Website: chan.gallery

Mitchell F. Chan (born 1982) is a Canadian artist working in digital media, conceptual art, and video games. He created Digital Zones of Immaterial Pictorial Sensibility in 2017, a conceptual work employing the Ethereum blockchain as a medium, and art games including The Boys of Summer (2023) and the Zantar series. His work Winslow Homer's Croquet Challenge (2022) is held in the permanent collection of the Buffalo AKG Art Museum. He is based in Toronto, Ontario.

== Early life and education ==
Chan was born in 1982 in Canada. He received a Master of Fine Arts from the School of the Art Institute of Chicago in 2011.

== Career ==
=== Early work ===
Chan began exhibiting at Angell Gallery in Toronto in 2009. His 2014 installation The Ingenious Gentleman Don Quixote of La Mancha was presented at the Four Seasons Centre for the Performing Arts in Toronto; the National Post covered the work, describing Chan as a Toronto-based artist engaged with questions of theatrical ambition and absurdity.

His 2016 exhibition Art & Inactivism at Angell Gallery examined cycles of media consumption and internet culture through video and sound installation.

=== Digital Zones of Immaterial Pictorial Sensibility (2017) ===
In August 2017, Chan debuted Digital Zones of Immaterial Pictorial Sensibility at InterAccess Media Art Centre in Toronto. The work is a conceptual homage to Yves Klein's 1959 Zones of Immaterial Pictorial Sensibility in which Klein exchanged receipts attesting to ownership of gallery space imbued with his signature shade of blue for gold leaf, with collectors having the option to "complete" the work by burning the receipt as Klein threw half the gold into the Seine. Chan transposed Klein's structure to the Ethereum blockchain, issuing tokens as certificates of ownership for intangible digital space, predating the ERC-721 standard that would later formalize non-fungible tokens.

Chan accompanied the work with The Blue Paper, a 33-page essay explaining its conceptual foundations. Writing in Outland, critic Kevin Buist described the work's historical position: "The design of the Ethereum network, with its ability to exchange contracts that attest to the value and ownership of non-objects, already echoed Klein's receipts. Chan made the connection explicit." Buist further characterized the work as presenting "an if/then condition: it is essentially a program without a computer, where the state of the artwork is conditional on the action of the owner."

Art in America identified Digital Zones as a significant early example of conceptual art employing the blockchain, noting that Chan had "first learned about Ethereum back in 2017," predating the broader market for such works. Writing in Artforum, curator Tina Rivers Ryan referenced Chan's 2017 blockchain reworking of Klein's Zones in tracing the art-historical lineage of NFTs.

Digital Zones of Immaterial Pictorial Sensibility was included in Sotheby's "Natively Digital" auction series in October 2021, and in 2024 was included in Monte di Pietà, an exhibition conceived by Christoph Büchel at Fondazione Prada as a collateral event of the 60th Venice Biennale.

=== Winslow Homer's Croquet Challenge (2022) ===
Winslow Homer's Croquet Challenge (2022) is an art game referencing the croquet paintings of Winslow Homer. The work was acquired by the Buffalo AKG Art Museum in 2022 after being commissioned as part of "Peer to Peer," an exhibition curated by Dr. Tina Rivers Ryan comprising sixteen blockchain-based works. The Buffalo AKG described the acquisition as the first major collection of blockchain-based art by a United States art museum. The exhibition was reviewed by critic Charlotte Kent in The Brooklyn Rail, who described Winslow Homer's Croquet Challenge as introducing "a dose of humor into the realm of high art."

The work was subsequently shown at Haus der Elektronischen Künste in Basel (2023) and in Singapore's ArtScience Museum (2023).

=== The Boys of Summer (2023) ===
The Boys of Summer (2023) is an art game combining a profile picture series with a playable game. Beginning as a high school baseball player in 2003, the player's avatar progresses through simulated seasons of athletic and personal life. The character image is progressively obscured by accumulating statistical interfaces measuring athletic, financial, and personal outcomes until the character's death. Players who hold a corresponding token may update the token's metadata to reflect their gameplay results.

The Brooklyn Rail reviewed the work in September 2023, with critics Charlotte Kent and Nancy Baker Cahill describing it as "an incisive socio-political and economic critique wrapped in the trojan horse of gameland's choose your own adventure." Outland included the work on its list of the best works of digital art of 2023. The work's thematic focus on quantification and life-as-statistics was noted by scholar Jacqueline Wernimont, whose research on the history of vital statistics informed the work's conception, as acknowledged by the artist.

=== Zantar (2024–25) ===
The Zantar series is a four-chapter anthology of interconnected games, the title taken from a character in the film Wayne's World. The series' formal reference point is Michael Snow's 1967 film Wavelength, which the games invert structurally. Writing in Artforum, Kevin Buist analyzed the series in relation to Chan's broader practice of deploying game mechanics as conceptual art strategies. The series was exhibited at DE SARTHE at Frieze Seoul and at Nguyen Wahed gallery in New York and London.

== Themes ==
Critics have identified agency — the player's capacity for action and choice — as a central concern of Chan's art games. Reviewing the Zantar series in Artforum, Kevin Buist wrote that the work places the player amid "the imperial forces of crypto, addictive game design, and the attention economy," concluding that "we can play the game, but the agency we're afforded is mostly an illusion." Chan has framed his practice around this idea, citing the philosopher C. Thi Nguyen's Games: Agency as Art (2020) in a 2024 essay for Outland and describing the game designer as one who "sculpts the player's agency." He calls the broader condition his work addresses a "crisis of agency" in which proliferating choices lead to a narrowing range of outcomes. A related theme is the quantification of human life. Writing in The Brooklyn Rail, Charlotte Kent and Nancy Baker Cahill linked The Boys of Summer to Jacqueline Wernimont's history of vital statistics, Numbered Lives (2019). Chan has also described designing gameplay as a deliberate distraction, engaging players just long enough for a work's narrative and critique to "seep in."

== Public art ==
Through his studio, Studio F Minus, Chan has contributed to public commissions including a monument to United Nations peacekeepers in Peterborough, Ontario (2022) and public works in Kelowna and Edmonton.

== Writing ==
Chan has contributed criticism and essays to Artforum and Outland. His 2024 Artforum essay "Human After All: On Art Blocks Marfa Weekend 2024" reflects on the development of generative art as a medium and its entry into major museum collections. His 2017 essay The Blue Paper, written to accompany Digital Zones of Immaterial Pictorial Sensibility, was described by Buist as displaying "an ambition that borders on hubris, at times a little silly but ultimately very endearing."

== Selected exhibitions ==
- 2024–25: Insert Coin(s), Nguyen Wahed, New York and London
- 2024: Monte di Pietà (conceived by Christoph Büchel), Fondazione Prada, Venice — collateral event of the 60th Venice Biennale
- 2023: Peer to Peer (curated by Tina Rivers Ryan), Buffalo AKG Art Museum
- 2023: Sandbox Mode, Office Impart, Berlin
- 2023: Notes from the Ether, ArtScience Museum, Singapore
- 2023: Who Is Online? Game Art in the Age of Post-NFTism, Haus der Elektronischen Künste, Basel
- 2021: Nil-Nil, The Bentway, Toronto
- 2017: Bitcoin, Ethereum, and Conceptual Art, InterAccess Media Art Centre, Toronto
