= T'ang Haywen =

Portrait of T'ang Haywen, Spring 1991

T'ang Haywen (Chinese: 曾海文; 1927–1991) was a Chinese-born painter who spent most of his professional life in Paris. His work is known for its fusion of the Chinese spiritual aesthetic of ink brush painting with Western abstract expressionism. His reputation has grown since his death thanks to some major retrospective exhibitions.

== Early life ==
T’ang Haywen was born in 1927 in Xiamen in Fujian Province, China. His early intellectual development was deeply influenced by his grandfather, who introduced him to the principles of Taoism, which strongly shaped T'ang's outlook, and later his art.

When the Second Sino-Japanese War broke out in 1937, T'ang's family migrated to Vietnam and settled in Cholon, the Chinese district of Saigon, where T'ang's father established a successful silk business. T'ang attended the French school in Saigon and learned calligraphy from his grandfather. At the age of 19, T'ang adopted the name Haywen: when written in Chinese, the name consists of the ideograms for "sea" and "literature". (The name would be written hǎiwén in the pinyin romanisation system; "T'ang" is a regional pronunciation of his surname character 曾, which is pronounced "zēng" in standard Chinese.)

== Migration to France and artistic career ==
In 1948, T'ang moved to Paris, ostensibly to study medicine in keeping with the wishes of his father. However, once in France, T'ang soon began to pursue his long-held ambition to be a painter. He undertook little formal artistic training, but spent much time in museums and galleries, where he closely observed the work of Western masters, quoting them freely in his early oils and watercolors. He quickly developed a passion for travel, a constant feature of his life that was reflected in his art and career: his very first exhibition (1955) was in Paris, but it would be seven years before he again showed his work in France: during the intervening period he had shows in Switzerland, Canada and Luxembourg, and three in Morocco.

Untitled, Ink on Kyro card, 1970, Diptych. Art Institute of Chicago, US

By the mid-1960s, T'ang's work was showing a preference for gouache or ink on paper, and traditional Chinese stylistic elements were becoming a feature of his painting. His works were influenced by the aesthetic legacy of Western masters like Henri Matisse, J. M. W. Turner and the impressionists, and shaped by the spiritual elements of the Taoist approach to painting, in which the artist seeks to capture the interplay of energies that give life to the natural world. Typical works of this period were quick studies of scenes in the natural world, often rendered in a few brushstrokes, that gave life to his conviction that "painting is the embodiment of energy." His synthesis of the Eastern Taoist tradition with a Western aesthetic, together with the arresting beauty of his compositions, began to attract serious attention from a small circle of critics, painters and admirers.

During the 1970s, he refined the artistic format in which his works would be produced - the diptych on paper, usually untitled and measuring 70 x 100 cm. In Goa, India, T'ang met the filmmaker Tom Tam, and the two collaborated on two short films. They shot Furen Boogie on the beach in Goa and several months later, in T'ang's small apartment-studio in Paris, they shot T'ang Boogie. T'ang Boogie renders the artist's work as a series of fleeting images and is the first known example of an experimental movie by a Chinese artist. During the 1980s he had some significant exhibitions in France, notably at the Musée des Beaux Arts de Vitré and the Musée des Beaux Arts de Vannes. However, did not gain any significant recognition during his lifetime.

In 1989, six months after the Tian Anmen square protest T'ang participated in a show at the Centre Georges Pompidou entitled Tian Anmen 4 Juin-4 Décembre je n'oublie pas . In May 1991 his friend Yonfan Manshih, the movie director and photographer from Hong Kong, shot T'ang's last known portrait in his small apartment of the rue Liancourt in Paris. It was published in November 1991 in "A Chinese Portrait" along with images of Chang Dai-chien and Zao Wou-Ki in their studio. T'ang Haywen died of respiratory complications in Paris on September 9, 1991. He was 64 years old.

== Posthumous reputation ==
T'ang Haywen's art found a wider public after his death, thanks to several retrospective exhibitions, notably at the Oceanographic Museum in Monaco in 1996, at the Taipei Fine Arts Museum in Taiwan in 1997, The musée Tavet-Delacour in Pontoise, France in 1999, the Musée Guimet in Paris and the gallery of the Shiseido Foundation in Tokyo in 2002 and monographic exhibitions such as T'ang Haywen a modern Chinese painter at the Art Basel Hong Kong fair in 2013 and in September 2014 an exhibition at the de Sarthe gallery in Hong Kong with an "exhibition catalog" with texts by Yonfan Manshih and Jean-Paul Desroches. Major collections that hold his work include the Musée Guimet, the Musée Cernuschi and the Musée d'art moderne de la ville de Paris, The Menil Collection in Houston, the Art Institute of Chicago and the M+ Museum, the new museum of visual culture, part of the West Kowloon Cultural District in Hong Kong.

In 2002 a monograph, Paths of Ink, was published at the time of the retrospective at the Musée Guimet.

The intestate death of T'ang Haywen prompted Philippe Koutouzis to track down his family in China, acquire the reproduction rights to the work from his brother and then begin drafting the catalog raisonné. After lengthy legal proceedings challenging his rights, Philippe Koutouzis benefited in 2018 from a decision by the Cour de Cassation - France's Supreme Court- putting an end to any further challenges to his rights. In 2015 the establishment of T'ang Haywen Archives in Hong Kong and the creation of the website - https://tanghaywenarchives.com/ - now offer institutions, collectors and the public a reliable source of information.
