= Sumo language =

Sumo language can refer to:

- Sumo languages of Nicaragua
- Bouni language of Papua New Guinea (spoken in Sumo village)
