= Sumo Paint =

Online image editor

Sumopaint
- Developer: Sumo Apps Ltd.
- Written in: JavaScript, Originally ActionScript
- Type: Graphics software
- Website: sumo.app/paint

Sumopaint, also written as Sumo Paint, is a free painting and drawing web application similar to Adobe Photoshop.

Sumopaint has web-based "paint" features similar in some respects to Pixlr. It was originally created in 2008 by Sumo Limited. Sumopaint has many of the same tools and features as Photoshop but is geared more towards illustration, whereas other software such as Photoshop is more suited for heavy image editing. It has been used to teach students how to edit images. Like Photoshop, it has layering capability, image adjustment tools such as changing the color balance, options for blending images, shadows and bevels, filters such as sharpening and blurring. Reviewer Kris Fong of MacWorld magazine described some "quirkiness with certain tools and layers" and noted that it only works with certain file formats such as JPEG, PNG and GIF formats, and only allows users to save images in the JPEG and PNG formats, as well as an internal file format called Sumo files.

There is a support community called sumo.app with community features, such as uploading, commenting on, and rating images, which are accessible to those with accounts. There is a paid professional version of the software called Sumo Pro which activates features such as a downloadable version of the software.

The original version, "Sumo Paint", was written with Flash.
