= Just Loomis =

American photographer (born 1957)

Just Loomis (born January 1957 in Reno, Nevada) is a fine art photographer known for his portraiture and fashion photography. His work has been published and exhibited internationally and has appeared in Harper's Bazaar, British Vogue, Vanity Fair, The New Yorker, and The New York Times Magazine. His book of American portraits, As We Are was published in 2010 by Hatje Cantz.

== Career ==
=== Early work ===
Just Loomis began taking photographs in the 1970s. His earliest work, taken when he was in high school, focused on the people and landscapes around Reno, Nevada, where he was raised.

=== Recent work ===
Hatje Cantz in Berlin published Loomis' work in a book. "As We Are" was published in 2010, was nominated for the Deutscher Fotobuchpreis, and was named "Photobook of the Year" by Communication Arts and PDN magazines. The publication of "As We Are" led to a one-man exhibit of the work at the Stenersen Museum in Oslo, Norway.

Loomis has just completed a project on the Volksbuehne theater in Berlin and is preparing his second book with Hatje Cantz.

== Awards ==
- 1986 - Nominated for the Grammy Award for Best Recording Package for A-ha's Hunting High and Low

== Exhibitions ==
- March 2017, Rausch und Kontrolle, Volksbuehne Theater, Berlin
- November 2013, Women, Hiltawsky Gallery, Berlin
- June 2012, Three Boys, Williamson Gallery, Art Center College of Design, Pasadena
- February 2010, As We Are and Aha the Photographs, Stenersen Museum, Oslo
- June 2009, Three Boys, Helmut Newton Foundation, Berlin
- May 2009, Walk Away, Lincoln Center, New York
