= June Newton =

Australian photographer (1923–2021)

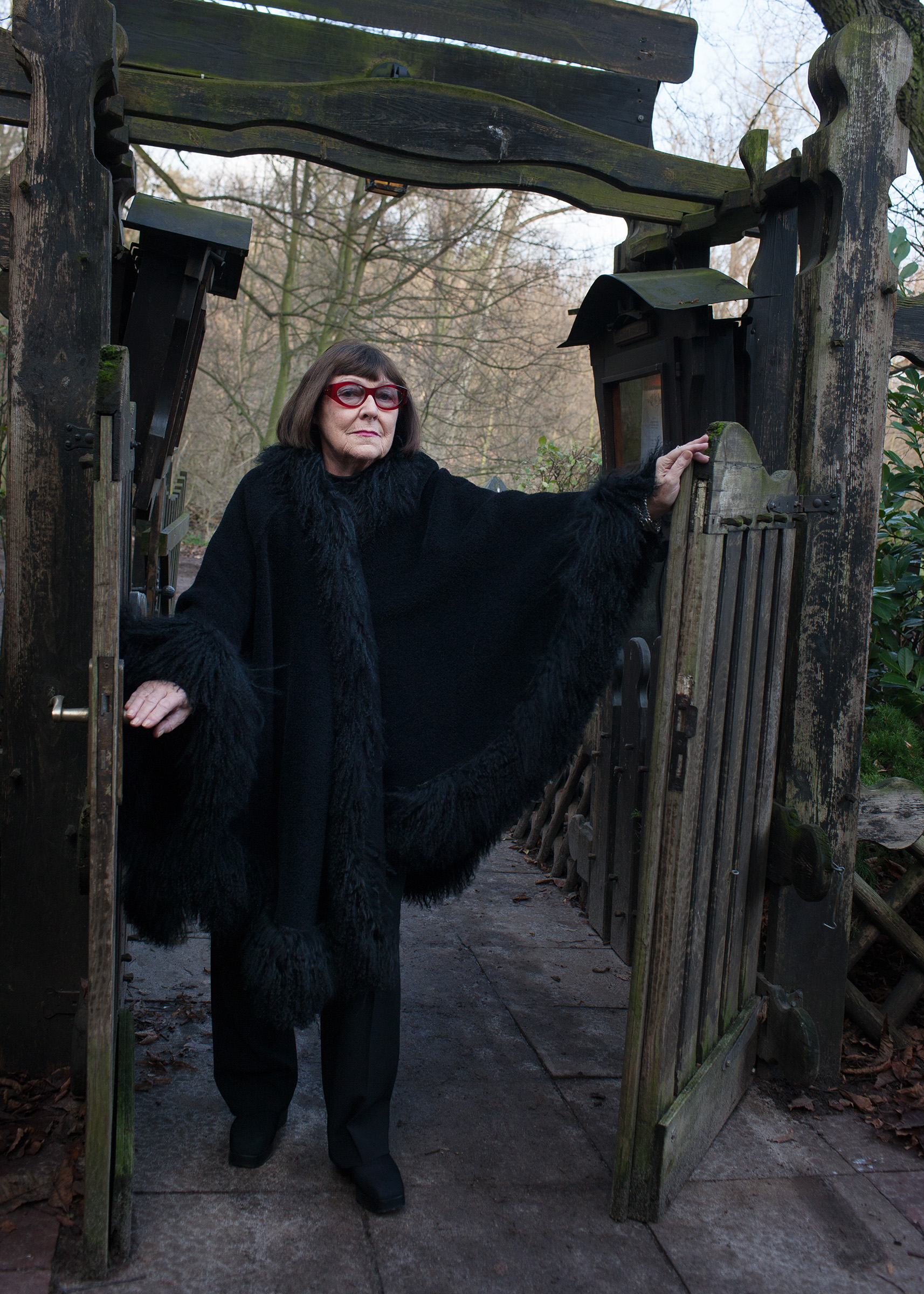
- June Newton photographed by Oliver Mark, Berlin 2008
- Born: June Browne; 3 June 1923; Melbourne, Australia
- Died: 9 April 2021 (aged 97); Monte Carlo, Monaco
- Other names: June Brunell, Alice Springs
- Occupations: Actress, photographer, model
- Spouse: Helmut Newton (m. 1948; died 2004)

June Newton (née Browne, 3 June 1923 – 9 April 2021) was an Australian model, actress, and photographer. As an actress she was known professionally as June Brunel or Brunell (Note: The greatest number of references spell the name she used in her stage career as "Brunell", but it is "Brunel" in contemporary advertisements in Melbourne's press, placed by Garnet H. Carroll and Irene Mitchell. Melbourne's most prominent theatre critic, Frank Doherty of The Argus, never deviated from "Brunel". "H.A.S." (Hugh Standish) of The Herald (and later chairman of the Erik Award committee) had "Brunell" early in her career but "Brunel" later; The Age did not name its critics, and only one article had "June Brunel", for a captioned portrait.) and won the Erik Award for Best Actress in 1956. From 1970 onward she worked as a photographer under the pseudonym Alice Springs. Her photographs have appeared in publications such as Vanity Fair, Interview, Elle and Vogue.

She was the wife of the fashion photographer Helmut Newton.

== Biography ==
=== Modelling and acting ===
June Browne was born in Melbourne, Australia, on 3 June 1923 to Alice Maude Browne and Thomas Francis Browne, a vaudevillian. Her parents divorced when she was five years old.

She first met Berlin-born photographer Helmut Newton in 1947 at his studio in Melbourne. At the time, June was working as an actress under the surname Brunell (to avoid confusion with a local actress named June Brown) and had answered an ad for some modelling work at Helmut's studio. The couple were married the following year.

While still acting under the surname Brunell, she won the Erik Kuttner Award for Best Actress in 1956, an award given for excellence in theatre in Melbourne. Although she was finding success in Australia as an actress, Helmut was offered a year-long contract with British Vogue and the couple moved to London in 1957. While there, June found acting work with the BBC. Helmut did not enjoy his time there, and the couple left England.

In the following years, Helmut found work with such publications as Jardin des Modes and Australian Vogue. By 1960, the couple settled in Paris, and Helmut's photographic career flourished.

=== Photography ===
June's work as a photographer began in 1970 when she stepped in for her husband who had fallen ill. Helmut was scheduled to photograph a model for an ad for Gitanes cigarettes when he came down with the flu. Unable to contact the model to cancel their appointment, Helmut gave his wife a quick lesson in photography and she photographed the model later that same day.

In a 1987 interview with June and her husband for Orange Coast magazine, June said Helmut decided that she should use a different name professionally as a photographer "because he thought one Newton in the family was enough. And if I didn't succeed..." June chose the pseudonym Alice Springs from the Australian town of the same name. She selected the name by blindly stabbing a pin into a map of Australia. Alice Springs did however find success; by 1974, one of her photographs had appeared on the cover of Elle.

Over her career, Alice Springs' photographs appeared in magazines such as Vogue, Elle, Marie Claire, Vanity Fair, Interview, and Stern. Working first as a fashion photographer and later as a portraitist, she photographed such famous figures as William S. Burroughs, Anthony Burgess, Catherine Deneuve, Graham Greene, Roy Lichtenstein, Robert Mapplethorpe, Christopher Reeve, Diana Vreeland, Yves Saint Laurent, Brigitte Nielsen and Nicole Kidman.

Throughout her photographic career, Newton continued to work as her husband's art director, acting both as editor and curator of Helmut's work. She also appeared in some of her husband's photos.

=== Helmut by June ===
The Newtons lived in Paris for 27 years and then moved to Monte Carlo — spending winters in Los Angeles for three months of the year. Their lives were documented in the 1995 telefilm Helmut by June, co-produced by the French pay-TV channel Canal+. The majority of the footage for the documentary was shot by June in the 1990s using a video camera that she had purchased for her husband as a Christmas present. June's footage was edited to a one-hour film that was shown in France. This footage was seen by film director Brett Ratner, who decided that he wanted to bring it to a U.S. audience. He shot two additional minutes of June talking about Helmut, which he added as an introduction to the film; Ratner's version premiered on Cinemax on 30 April 2007.

=== Helmut Newton Foundation ===
On 23 January 2004, Helmut Newton lost control of his vehicle as he exited the driveway of the Chateau Marmont hotel and crashed into a retaining wall across the street from the hotel; he died shortly after being taken to Cedars-Sinai Medical Center. The Helmut Newton Foundation opened in Berlin in June of that same year.

Permanently located in the Museum of Photography in Berlin, the Helmut Newton Foundation is in a building that stands next to the train station from which Helmut left Berlin to escape the Nazis in 1938. The Newtons had been planning the foundation's opening just before Helmut's death. The opening of the foundation featured June and Helmut's portraits from their joint 1999 publication Us and Them. The book features portraits that June and Helmut had taken of one another as well as photographs that they had both taken of certain celebrities.

=== Personal life ===
Newton was a Roman Catholic and recalled mistreatment in her childhood in Australia due to her Irish heritage. She died at the age of 97 in a hospital in Monte Carlo, Monaco, on 9 April 2021.

== Publications ==
- Alice Springs: Portraits (Twelvetrees Press, 1986) ISBN 0942642244
- Us and them (Scalo, 1999) ISBN 3908247101
- Mrs. Newton (Taschen, 2004) ISBN 3822830577

== Filmography ==
- Helmut Newton: Frames from the Edge (1989), as herself
- Helmut by June (1995), as herself
