= Hunting High and Low =

1985 a-ha album

Studio album by a-ha
- Released: 1 June 1985 (U.S.A and Norway) 28 October 1985 (Worldwide)
- Recorded: 1984–1985
- Studios: Eel Pie (Twickenham, London)
- Genres: Synth-pop; new wave
- Length: 37:10
- Label: Warner Bros.
- Producers: Tony Mansfield; John Ratcliff; Alan Tarney

A-ha chronology
Hunting High and Low (1985)	Scoundrel Days (1986)

Singles from Hunting High and Low
- 1. "Love Is Reason" Released: 1 April 1985 (Norway); 2. "Take On Me" Released: 17 June 1985; 3. "The Sun Always Shines on T.V." Released: November 1985 (US); 4. "Train of Thought" Released: 24 March 1986; 5. "Hunting High and Low" Released: 2 June 1986

Hunting High and Low is the debut studio album by the Norwegian synth-pop band a-ha, first released on 1 June 1985 by Warner Bros. Records in Norway and the United States, and then released in the United Kingdom and Europe on 28 October 1985. The album was a huge commercial success, reaching high positions on charts worldwide. The album was recorded at Eel Pie Studios in Twickenham, London, and produced by Tony Mansfield, John Ratcliff and Alan Tarney.

In all, five singles from the album were released, though not all were released internationally: "Take On Me", "Love Is Reason", "The Sun Always Shines on T.V.", "Train of Thought" and the title track. The group was nominated for Best New Artist at the Grammy Awards in 1986, making a-ha the first Norwegian band to be nominated for a Grammy.

As part of a re-release of their first two studio albums, Hunting High and Low was expanded and remastered in 2010.

== Music ==
"Take On Me" was the first single released by the band. An early version was recorded and released in late 1984 with an early music video. The song became a No. 3 hit in a-ha's native Norway but failed to chart in the United Kingdom. The band went back into the studio to re-record the song for the Hunting High and Low album, but a second UK release in early 1985 was again ignored. Before releasing their single in the United States, the band undertook the production of a new music video for the song, working with director Steve Barron. Barron had previously created hit videos for Toto, Thomas Dolby, Culture Club, Madonna and Michael Jackson, but the a-ha video was unlike any of his earlier work. A plot-driven amalgamation of live action and rotoscope-style animation by husband-and-wife team Michael Patterson and Candace Reckinger, it drew inspiration from Patterson's animated film Commuter and the film Altered States. The innovative video for "Take On Me" was first broadcast on local Boston music video station V-66, and soon after given heavy rotation on MTV.

The single debuted in Billboard the week of 13 July 1985, and was heading into the US top twenty when it was given an international release, including a second release in Norway and a third shot at the UK market. It hit number one on the Billboard Hot 100 in the United States, spending 27 weeks on the charts and becoming the tenth-biggest single of 1985, and this time going to number two in the United Kingdom and number one in Norway.

The second single for most of the world was "The Sun Always Shines on T.V." ("Love Is Reason" had failed to hit the Norwegian Top 40 earlier in the year), and the band followed its massively successful music video with another critically acclaimed clip for the song. Starting off as a sequel of sorts, Harket breaks away from his happy ending to join his band in performance amidst mannequins at a rural church, Saint Albans in Teddington, London, which has since become an art gallery. "The Sun Always Shines on T.V." improved upon the first single's success in the United Kingdom, hitting number one and remaining there for two weeks in January 1986. It was a top-10 hit nearly everywhere it was released except in the United States, where it peaked at No. 20 and would be the band's last major hit to date in that country. The track was remixed as a dance version, which was a top-5 hit on the US Dance Singles Sales chart, and B-side to the single and remix was the otherwise unreleased "Driftwood."

"Train of Thought" saw limited release as the third single in Europe. It was not released as a 7" in the United States but received rock radio play and a set of remixes again made the dance charts. Waaktaar based the lyrics for this song on existentialist authors and poets Gunvor Hofmo, Knut Hamsun and Fyodor Dostoevsky, his favourites at the time. It was a-ha's third consecutive Top 10 single in the United Kingdom and Ireland, reaching Nos. 8 and 5 respectively, and charting well in Germany and Sweden. World sales hit 500,000 copies.

The last single from the album was "Hunting High and Low", released in June 1986. The single saw its highest chartings in France, where it peaked at number four, and the United Kingdom, where it was number five. The single was released in the United States but did not make the Hot 100. An extended version was available on 12" vinyl, but the midtempo track did not see dance chart success.

The "Take On Me" video was nominated for eight 1986 MTV Video Music Awards, and at the third annual ceremony 5 September 1986, the video won six awards, including Best New Artist and Viewer's Choice. "The Sun Always Shines on T.V." was nominated for an additional three awards, winning two, for a total of eight wins. Even as the total number of categories has nearly doubled, only Peter Gabriel has won as many of the awards in a single year, for "Sledgehammer" and "Big Time", also featuring innovative use of animation.

The band went on a world tour for the album from June 1986 to February 1987, visiting 16 countries and 113 cities.

In 2002, "Take On Me" was ranked at number eight on VH1's 100 Greatest One Hit Wonders, although this status is slightly misleading as it reflects a-ha's lack of mainstream success in the United States; the group was by no means a one-hit wonder elsewhere or in career terms. In 2006, "Take On Me" was ranked number 24 on VH1's Greatest Songs of the 1980s.

On 17 February 2020, the music video for "Take On Me" reached one billion views on YouTube. At the time, only four songs from the entire 20th century had reached the mark—"November Rain" and "Sweet Child o' Mine" by Guns N' Roses, "Smells Like Teen Spirit" by Nirvana, and Queen's "Bohemian Rhapsody"—making "Take On Me" the fifth video from that time period to ever do so. a-ha also became the first continental European act to accomplish this achievement.

The cover photograph was taken by Just Loomis and was nominated in 1986 for a Grammy as "Album Cover of the Year."

The band released a live version of "The Sun Always Shines on T.V." in 2003.

== Release and critical reception ==
Professional ratings
Review scores
Source	Rating
AllMusic	4/5 stars
Billboard	4.5/5 stars
The Encyclopedia of Popular Music	3/5 stars
Record Collector	5/5 stars
Uncut	3/5 stars
The Village Voice	C−

Hunting High and Low was a-ha's breakout album. Upon its release in June 1985, Hunting High and Low peaked at number 15 on the Billboard's Top 200 album chart. The album granted a-ha international recognition. Hunting High and Low achieved 3× platinum status in the UK and Platinum status in the United States and Germany, and Gold status in Brazil, and the Netherlands. The album reached No. 11 in the European top-100 albums sales chart.

The album peaked at number 15 in the US, according to Billboard music charts. It peaked at number 2 on the UK Albums Chart (re-entered at number 83 in 2015), and hit 1 in Norway. The album has been certified platinum in the United States and 3× platinum in UK. On the Billboard 200, Hunting High and Low held the record for the highest-charting album by a Norwegian artist until 2014's Do It Again by Norwegian duo Röyksopp and Swedish singer Robyn (which peaked at number 14).

Beginning with the single "Take On Me", a-ha's debut album spawned two number one hits. In the fall of 1986, "Take On Me" and "The Sun Always Shines on T.V." were nominated for 11 MTV Video Awards combined, and a-ha won eight of these.

Tim DiGravina of AllMusic said retrospectively: "It's a cohesive album with smart pace changeups, and it rarely fails to delight or satisfy a listener's need for a synth pop fix... One can't escape the feeling that Hunting High and Low is a product of the 1980s, but with highs like 'Take On Me' and 'The Sun Always Shines on TV,' and no lows in sight, a-ha's debut is a treat worth relishing." Reviewing a 2015 re-issue of the album in The New York Observer, Ron Hart wrote, "Hunting High and Low enjoys a brilliance far beyond its iconic lead single 'Take On Me'. The influence of this album can be heard today through such bands as Coldplay and Wild Nothing just as the work of early synthpop groups like OMD and Aztec Camera informed [a-ha] in creating these 10 classic tunes."

The album was also included in the book 1001 Albums You Must Hear Before You Die (2006).

The album has sold more than ten million copies worldwide.

== Remaster ==
On 6 May 2010, the band announced that a remastered and expanded two-disc deluxe edition of the album would be released, featuring the original album and four 12" tracks on the first disc and 19 rare demos and unreleased songs from the era on the second. The deluxe editions of both Hunting High and Low and its follow-up, Scoundrel Days (1986), were released on 6 July 2010 in the United States through Rhino Records. Both albums debuted in the Top 40 on the Billboard Top Internet Sales Chart; Hunting High and Low at No. 34 and Scoundrel Days at No. 36. The Hunting High and Low reissue also charted in Germany (39), Norway (32), Hungary (27) and the UK (165).

== Track listing ==
All tracks are written by Pål Waaktaar, except where noted.

Side one
No.	Title	Writer(s)	Length
1.	"Take On Me"	Waaktaar, Magne Furuholmen, Morten Harket	3:48
2.	"Train of Thought"		4:14
3.	"Hunting High and Low"		3:45
4.	"The Blue Sky"		2:36
5.	"Living a Boy's Adventure Tale"	Waaktaar, Harket	5:00

Side two
No.	Title	Writer(s)	Length
6.	"The Sun Always Shines on T.V."		5:08
7.	"And You Tell Me"		1:51
8.	"Love Is Reason"	Waaktaar, Furuholmen	3:04
9.	"I Dream Myself Alive"	Waaktaar, Furuholmen	3:06
10.	"Here I Stand and Face the Rain"		4:30

=== 2010 deluxe edition ===
Disc one – The Original Album & Bonus Tracks
No.	Title	Length
11.	"Take On Me" (Original 7″ Version 1984)	3:18
12.	"The Sun Always Shines on T.V." (Extended Mix)	7:09
13.	"Train of Thought" (U.S. Mix)	7:03
14.	"Hunting High and Low" (Extended Remix)	6:03

Disc two – Demos, B-Sides & Rarities
No.	Title	Writer(s)	Length
1.	"Take On Me" (Demo)	Waaktaar, Furuholmen, Harket	3:12
2.	"Train of Thought" (Demo)		4:20
3.	"Hunting High and Low" (Demo)		3:09
4.	"The Blue Sky" (Demo)		3:18
5.	"Living a Boy's Adventure Tale" (Early Version)	Waaktaar, Harket	5:15
6.	"The Sun Always Shines on T.V." (Demo)		4:09
7.	"And You Tell Me" (Demo)		1:54
8.	"Love Is Reason" (Demo)	Waaktaar, Furuholmen	2:24
9.	"I Dream Myself Alive" (Demo)	Waaktaar, Furuholmen	3:05
10.	"Here I Stand and Face the Rain" (Demo)		3:54
11.	"Stop! And Make Your Mind Up"		3:03
12.	"Driftwood"		3:06
13.	"Dot the I"	Waaktaar, Furuholmen, Harket	3:22
14.	"The Love Goodbye"	Waaktaar, Furuholmen, Harket	3:25
15.	"Nothing to It"	Waaktaar, Furuholmen, Harket	3:44
16.	"Go to Sleep"		2:14
17.	"Monday Mourning"	Waaktaar, Furuholmen	3:08
18.	"All the Planes That Come In on the Quiet"		3:05
19.	"Never Never"		3:17
20.	"What's That You're Doing to Yourself in the Pouring Rain"		2:39
21.	"You Have Grown Thoughtful Again"	Waaktaar, Furuholmen, Harket	2:30
22.	"Lesson One" (Autumn 1982 "Take On Me" Demo)	Waaktaar, Furuholmen, Harket	2:42
23.	"Presenting Lily Mars"	Waaktaar, Harket	2:58

Download-only bonus tracks
No.	Title	Writer(s)	Length
24.	"The Sun Always Shines on T.V." (Extended Version)		8:25
25.	"Take On Me" (Instrumental Mix)	Waaktaar, Furuholmen, Harket	3:48
26.	"Hunting High and Low" (Slow Version Demo)		3:45
27.	"Take On Me" (1984 12″ Mix)	Waaktaar, Furuholmen, Harket	3:46

== Personnel ==
A-ha

- Morten Harket – lead and backing vocals
- Magne Furuholmen – keyboards, bass programming, backing vocals
- Pål Waaktaar – guitars, drum programming, backing vocals

with:

- Claire Jarvis – oboe (track 5)

Technical

- Bobby Hata – mastering
- John Ratcliff – production, remixing, keyboards, backing vocals (track 8)
- Alan Tarney – production (tracks 1, 6)
- Tony Mansfield – production (tracks 2–5, 7, 9, 10)
- Jeffrey Kent Ayeroff – art direction, design
- Neill King – engineering
- Jeri McManus – art direction, cover design, design
- Bob Ludwig – mastering
- Just Loomis – photography

== Charts ==
=== Weekly charts ===
Weekly chart performance for Hunting High and Low
Chart (1985–1986)	Peak position
Australian Albums (Kent Music Report)	15
Austrian Albums (Ö3 Austria)	18
Brazilian Albums (NOPEM)	3
Canadian Top 100 Albums (RPM)	8
Dutch Albums (Album Top 100)	11
European Albums (Music & Media)	5
Finnish Albums (Suomen virallinen lista)	6
French Albums (IFOP)	7
German Albums (Offizielle Top 100)	10
Icelandic Albums (Tónlist)	9
Italian Albums (Musica e dischi)	17
New Zealand Albums (RMNZ)	1
Norwegian Albums (VG-lista)	1
Spanish Albums (AFYVE)	20
Swedish Albums (Sverigetopplistan)	1
Swiss Albums (Schweizer Hitparade)	10
UK Albums (Official Charts)	2
US Billboard 200	15

Weekly chart performance for Hunting High and Low (2010 reissue)
Chart (2010)	Peak position
German Albums (Offizielle Top 100)	39
Hungarian Albums (MAHASZ)	27
Norwegian Albums (VG-lista)	32
UK Albums (Official Charts)	165

=== Year-end charts ===
1985 year-end chart performance for Hunting High and Low
Chart (1985)	Position
Canada Top Albums/CDs (RPM)	49
Norwegian Autumn Period Albums (VG-lista)	1
Norwegian Summer Period Albums (VG-lista)	3

1986 year-end chart performance for Hunting High and Low
Chart (1986)	Position
Australian Albums (Kent Music Report)	75
Canada Top Albums/CDs (RPM)	43
Dutch Albums (Album Top 100)	24
European Albums (Music & Media)	5
French Albums (IFOP)	36
German Albums (Offizielle Top 100)	11
Italian Albums (FIMI)	52
New Zealand Albums (RMNZ)	2
UK Albums (OCC)	7
US Billboard 200	73

== Certifications and sales ==
Certifications and sales for Hunting High and Low
Region	Certification	Certified units/sales
Australia (ARIA)	Gold	35,000^{‡}
Brazil (Pro-Música Brasil)	Gold	270,000
Canada (Music Canada)	2× Platinum	200,000^
Denmark (IFPI Danmark)	Gold	10,000^{‡}
France (SNEP)	Platinum	700,000
Germany (BVMI)	3× Gold	750,000^{^}
Hong Kong (IFPI Hong Kong)	Gold	10,000^{*}
Netherlands (NVPI)	Gold	50,000^{^}
New Zealand (RMNZ)	Platinum	15,000^{^}
Norway (IFPI Norway)	2× Platinum	228,000
Spain (Promusicae)	Gold	50,000^{^}
Sweden (GLF)	Platinum	100,000
Switzerland (IFPI Switzerland)	Platinum	50,000
United Kingdom (BPI)	3× Platinum	900,000^{^}
United States (RIAA)	Platinum	1,000,000^{^}
^{*} Sales figures based on certification alone.^{^} Shipments figures based on certification alone.^{‡} Sales+streaming figures based on certification alone.
