= Papa Roach discography =

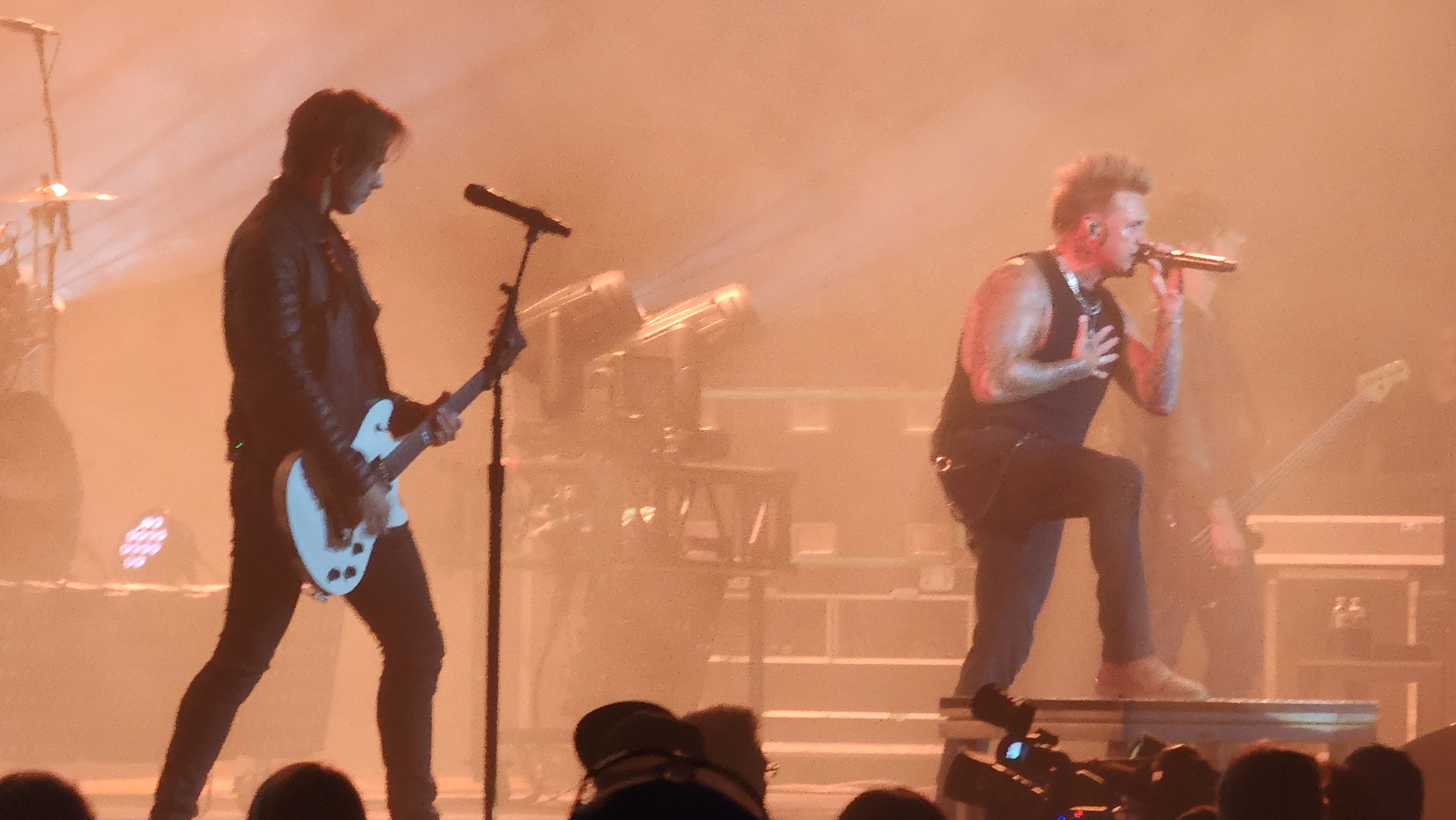
- Papa Roach performing live in Windsor, Ontario in 2023.
- Studio albums: 11
- Extended plays: 10
- Live albums: 1
- Compilation albums: 2
- Singles: 39
- Video albums: 1
- Music videos: 52

American rock band Papa Roach has released 11 studio albums, one live album, 10 extended plays, two compilation albums, 39 singles, and 53 music videos.

The band's first major-label release was the triple-platinum debut album Infest (2000). The group's success continued with their gold album Lovehatetragedy (2002), their platinum album Getting Away with Murder (2004), The Paramour Sessions (2006), Metamorphosis (2009), Time for Annihilation (2010), The Connection (2012), F.E.A.R. (2015), Crooked Teeth (2017) and Who Do You Trust? (2019). Their latest album Ego Trip was released on April 8, 2022.

== Albums ==
=== Studio albums ===
List of studio albums, with selected chart positions and certifications
Title	Album details	Peak chart positions										Sales	Certifications
Title	Album details	US	AUS	AUT	BEL (FL)	CAN	FRA	GER	NLD	SWI	UK	Sales	Certifications
Old Friends from Young Years	Released: February 4, 1997; Label: Onion Hardcore; Formats: CD, CS	—	—	—	—	—	—	—	—	—	—		
Infest	Released: April 25, 2000; Label: DreamWorks; Formats: CD, CS, digital download	5	50	12	9	5	—	5	47	16	9		RIAA: 4× Platinum; BPI: Platinum; BVMI: Platinum; IFPI AUT: Gold; IFPI SWI: Gold; MC: 2× Platinum; RMNZ: Platinum
Lovehatetragedy	Released: June 18, 2002; Label: DreamWorks; Formats: CD, CS, digital download	2	19	8	5	5	34	6	21	3	4		RIAA: Gold; BPI: Gold; IFPI SWI: Gold; MC: Gold
Getting Away with Murder	Released: August 31, 2004; Label: Geffen; Formats: CD, CS, digital download	17	82	8	14	12	64	8	38	13	30		RIAA: Platinum; BPI: Silver; BVMI: Gold; MC: Gold
The Paramour Sessions	Released: September 12, 2006; Label: Geffen; Formats: CD, CS, digital download	16	—	35	69	—	160	35	86	33	61		RIAA: Gold
Metamorphosis	Released: March 24, 2009; Label: DGC, Interscope; Formats: CD, digital download	8	74	12	50	14	—	23	—	21	42		BPI: Silver
The Connection	Released: October 2, 2012; Label: Eleven Seven; Formats: CD, LP, digital download	17	70	24	106	—	163	27	83	21	37		
F.E.A.R.	Released: January 27, 2015; Label: Eleven Seven; Formats: CD, digital download	15	29	8	47	8	90	6	32	8	13		
Crooked Teeth	Released: May 19, 2017; Label: Eleven Seven; Formats: CD, digital download	20	18	6	46	14	191	6	—	7	20		BPI: Silver
Who Do You Trust?	Released: January 18, 2019; Label: Eleven Seven; Formats: CD, digital download	73	42	8	131	70	131	4	—	3	36	US: 96,000	
Ego Trip	Released: April 8, 2022; Label: New Noize; Formats: CD, digital download	115	—	18	163	—	—	14	—	9	— (Note: Ego Trip did not enter the UK Albums Chart, but peaked at number 18 on the UK Album Sales chart.)	US: 204,000	
"—" denotes a recording that did not chart or was not released in that territory.

=== Live albums ===
List of live albums, with selected chart positions
Title	Album details	Peak chart positions								
Title	Album details	US	US Alt.	US Rock	AUT	BEL (FL)	CAN	GER	SWI	UK
Time for Annihilation	Released: August 31, 2010; Label: Eleven Seven; Formats: CD, digital download	23	5	9	38	54	31	40	64	71

=== Compilation albums ===
List of compilation albums, with selected chart positions
Title	Album details	Peak chart positions					Certifications
Title	Album details	US	US Alt.	US Rock	GRC	SWI	Certifications
...To Be Loved: The Best of Papa Roach	Released: June 29, 2010; Label: Geffen; Formats: CD, digital download	83	13	22	48	89	BPI: Gold
Greatest Hits Vol. 2: The Better Noise Years	Released: March 19, 2021; Label: Better Noise; Formats: CD, digital download	—	—	—	—	—	
"—" denotes a recording that did not chart or was not released in that territory.

== Extended plays ==
List of extended plays
Title	EP details
Potatoes for Christmas	Released: 1994; Label: dB; Formats: CD, CS
Caca Bonita	Released: 1995; Label: Self-released; Format: CS
5 Tracks Deep	Released: 1998; Label: Onion Hardcore, B Squared; Format: CD
Let 'Em Know	Released: 1999; Label: Onion Hardcore; Format: CD
She Loves Me Not	Released: May 31, 2002; Label: DreamWorks; Format: CD
Rolling Stone Original	Released: November 9, 2004; Label: DreamWorks; Format: Digital download
Live Session (iTunes Exclusive)	Released: July 17, 2007; Label: Geffen; Format: Digital download
Hit 3 Pack: Forever	Released: July 24, 2007; Label: Geffen; Format: Digital download
Hollywood Whore	Released: 2008; Label: DGC, Interscope; Format: Digital download
Lifeline	Released: 2009; Label: DGC, Interscope; Format: Digital download
Naked and Fearless: Acoustic EP	Released: June 23, 2009; Label: DGC, Interscope; Format: Digital download
20/20	Released: December 25, 2020; Label: New Noize; Format: Digital download
Leave a Light On (Talk Away the Dark)	Released: August 2, 2024; Label: New Noize; Format: Digital download

== Singles ==
=== As lead artist ===
==== 2000s ====
List of 2000s singles as lead artist, with selected chart positions, showing year released and album name
Title	Year	Peak chart positions										Certifications	Album
Title	Year	US	US Alt.	US Main. Rock	AUS	AUT	GER	IRL	NLD	SWI	UK	Certifications	Album
"Last Resort"	2000	57	1	4	86 (Note: "Last Resort" and "Between Angels and Insects" charted as a double A-side in Australia.)	7	4	13	32	25	3	RIAA: 6× Platinum; BPI: 2× Platinum; BVMI: 2× Platinum; RMNZ: 4× Platinum	Infest
"Broken Home"	2000	—	9	18	—	42	34	—	—	96	—		Infest
"Between Angels and Insects"	2001	—	16	27	86	—	94	20	—	—	17	BPI: Silver	Infest
"She Loves Me Not"	2002	76	5	3	72	—	47	23	62	72	14		Lovehatetragedy
"Time and Time Again"	2002	—	33	26	—	—	—	39	—	—	54		Lovehatetragedy
"Getting Away with Murder"	2004	69	4	2	—	28	38	—	89	—	45	RIAA: Platinum	Getting Away with Murder
"Scars"	2004	15	2	4	—	—	82	—	—	—	—	RIAA: 3× Platinum; BPI: Silver; RMNZ: Platinum	Getting Away with Murder
"Take Me"	2005	—	23	11	—	—	—	—	—	—	—		Getting Away with Murder
"...To Be Loved"	2006	— (Note: "...To Be Loved" did not enter the Billboard Hot 100, but peaked at number 16 on the Bubbling Under Hot 100 Singles chart, which acts as an extension to the Hot 100.)	14	8	—	—	—	—	—	—	171	RIAA: Gold	The Paramour Sessions
"Forever"	2007	55	2	2	—	—	—	—	—	—	—	RIAA: Platinum	The Paramour Sessions
"Time Is Running Out"	2007	—	17	15	—	—	—	—	—	—	—		The Paramour Sessions
"Reckless"	2007	—	—	40	—	—	—	—	—	—	—		The Paramour Sessions
"Hollywood Whore"	2008	—	—	37	—	—	—	—	—	—	139		Metamorphosis
"Lifeline"	2009	81	3	1	—	—	—	—	—	—	—	RIAA: Gold	Metamorphosis
"I Almost Told You That I Loved You"	2009	—	35	20	—	—	—	—	—	—	—		Metamorphosis
"—" denotes a recording that did not chart or was not released in that territory.

==== 2010s ====
List of 2010s singles as lead artist, with selected chart positions, showing year released and album name
Title	Year	Peak chart positions							Certifications	Album
Title	Year	US Alt.	US Main. Rock	US Rock	US Rock Airplay	US Hard Rock Digi.	CAN Rock	CZ	Certifications	Album
"Kick in the Teeth"	2010	18	2	6	4	—	10	—		Time for Annihilation
"Burn"	2010	17	3	8	8	18	46	—		Time for Annihilation
"No Matter What"	2011	—	13	29	29	—	—	—		Time for Annihilation
"Still Swingin'"	2012	32	3	22	17	12	43	— (Note: "Still Swingin'" did not enter the Czech Republic Radio – Top 100 chart, but entered the Czech Republic Modern Rock chart at 13.)		The Connection
"Where Did the Angels Go"	2012	—	2	—	23	—	—	—		The Connection
"Leader of the Broken Hearts"	2013	—	4	—	21	—	—	—		The Connection
"Face Everything and Rise"	2014	—	1	15	21	3	—	— (Note: "Face Everything and Rise" did not enter the Czech Republic Radio – Top 100 chart, but entered the Czech Republic Modern Rock chart at 17.)		F.E.A.R.
"Gravity" (featuring Maria Brink)	2015	—	5	28	28	5	—	— (Note: "Gravity" did not enter the Czech Republic Radio – Top 100 chart, but entered the Czech Republic Modern Rock chart at 15.)		F.E.A.R.
"Falling Apart"	2015	—	7	—	28	—	—	—		F.E.A.R.
"Help"	2017	37	1	15	8	2	6	63	RIAA: Gold; MC: Gold; RMNZ: Gold	Crooked Teeth
"American Dreams"	2017	—	3	35	17	—	38	16		Crooked Teeth
"Born for Greatness"	2017	—	1	22	13	14	24	— (Note: "Born for Greatness" did not enter the Czech Republic Radio – Top 100 chart, but entered the Czech Republic Modern Rock chart at 5.)	MC: Gold	Crooked Teeth
"Who Do You Trust?"	2018	—	3	28	15	—	24	— (Note: "Who Do You Trust?" did not enter the Czech Republic Radio – Top 100 chart, but entered the Czech Republic Modern Rock chart at 4.)		Who Do You Trust?
"Elevate"	2018	—	4	40	25	—	—	—		Who Do You Trust?
"Come Around"	2019	—	1	30	14	—	38	—		Who Do You Trust?
"—" denotes a recording that did not chart or was not released in that territory.

==== 2020s ====
List of 2020s singles as lead artist, with selected chart positions, showing year released and album name
Title	Year	Peak chart positions										Certifications	Album
Title	Year	US Adult	US Alt.	US Main. Rock	US Rock	US Rock Air.	US Hard Rock Dig.	US Hard Rock	CAN Rock	CZE Air.	GER Air.	Certifications	Album
"The Ending"	2020	—	—	1	—	14	—	11	37	—	—		Who Do You Trust?
"Last Resort (Reloaded)" (with Jeris Johnson)	2021	—	—	—	27	—	1	1	—	—	—		Non-album single
"Swerve" (featuring Fever 333 and Sueco or with Hollywood Undead)	2021	—	—	35	—	—	19	9	—	—	—		Ego Trip
"Kill the Noise"	2021	—	33	1	26	4	9	2	22	—	—		Ego Trip
"Stand Up"	2022	—	—	12	—	28	17	19	—	—	—		Ego Trip
"No Apologies"	2022	—	34	1	—	4	—	13	32	—	—		Ego Trip
"Cut the Line" (original or featuring Beartooth)	2023	—	—	1	—	10	—	19	30	—	—		Ego Trip
"Leave a Light On (Talk Away the Dark)" (original or with Carrie Underwood)	2023	14	11	1	40	10	—	—	—	11	49	RIAA: Gold	Ego Trip
"Even If It Kills Me"	2025	—	6	1	39	2	5	4	1	16	29		TBA
"Braindead" (featuring Toby Morse)	2025	—	—	1	—	7	—	17	—	—	63		TBA
"Wake Up Calling"	2026	22	19	1	—	4	5	6	2	18	44		TBA
"See U In Hell" (featuring Hanumankind)	2026	—	—	3	—	17	7	8	—	—	—		Devil May Cry
"—" denotes a recording that did not chart or was not released in that territory.

=== As featured artist ===
List of singles as featured artist, with selected chart positions, showing year released and album name
Title	Year	Peak chart positions	Album
Title	Year	US Hard Rock Digi.	Album
"Heart of a Champion" (remix) (Hollywood Undead featuring Papa Roach and Ice Nine Kills)	2020	16	New Empire, Vol. 2

=== Promotional singles ===
List of promotional singles as lead artist, with selected chart positions, showing year released and album name
Title	Year	Peak chart positions		Album
Title	Year	US Active Rock	US Hot Hard Rock	Album
"Dead Cell"	2001	—	—	Infest
"Had Enough"	2009	40	—	Metamorphosis
"One Track Mind"	2011	—	—	Time for Annihilation
"Before I Die"	2013	—	—	The Connection
"Warriors"	2014	—	—	F.E.A.R.
"Broken as Me"	2015	—	—	F.E.A.R.
"Never Have to Say Goodbye"	2015	—	—	F.E.A.R.
"Devil"	2015	—	—	F.E.A.R.
"Crooked Teeth"	2016	—	—	Crooked Teeth
"Periscope" (featuring Skylar Grey)	2017	—	—	Crooked Teeth
"Traumatic"	2017	—	—	Crooked Teeth
"Renegade Music"	2018	—	—	Who Do You Trust?
"Not the Only One"	2018	—	—	Who Do You Trust?
"Domination" (with Kayzo and Sullivan King)	2021	—	—	Non-album single
"Dying to Believe"	2021	—	21	Ego Trip
"—" denotes a recording that did not chart or was not released in that territory.

== Other appearances ==
List of other appearances, showing year released and album name
Title	Year	Album	Ref.
"Blood Brothers"	2001	Ozzfest 2001: The Second Millennium	
"Dead Cell" / "Tough Enough Theme" (live)	2001	WWF Tough Enough	
"Don't Look Back" (with N.E.R.D)	2003	Biker Boyz soundtrack	
"Anxiety" (with Black Eyed Peas)	2003	Elephunk	
"Not Coming Home"	2006	Kevin & Bean's Super Christmas	
"Even If I Could"	2012	Avengers Assemble	

== Videography ==
=== Video albums ===
Title	Album details
Papa Roach: Live & Murderous in Chicago	Released: November 22, 2005; Label: Geffen; Formats: DVD

=== Music videos ===
List of music videos, showing director(s) and year released
Title	Year	Director(s)	Type	Album	Link
"Last Resort"	2000	Marcos Siega	Performance	Infest	
"Broken Home"	2000	Marcos Siega	Narrative	Infest	
"Dead Cell"	2001	Robert Lyon	Live performance	Infest	
"Between Angels and Insects"	2001	Joseph Kahn	Performance	Infest	
"She Loves Me Not"	2002	Dave Meyers	Performance	Lovehatetragedy	
"Time and Time Again"	2002	Samuel Bayer	Narrative	Lovehatetragedy	
"Time and Time Again" (alternate version)	2002	The Malloys	Performance	Lovehatetragedy	
"Getting Away with Murder"	2004	Motion Theory	Narrative	Getting Away with Murder	
"Scars"	2005	Motion Theory	Narrative	Getting Away with Murder	
"Scars" (alternate version)	2005	Steve Murashige	Narrative	Getting Away with Murder	
"...To Be Loved"	2006	Kevin Kerslake	Performance	The Paramour Sessions	
"Forever" (live)	2007	Meiert Avis	Live performance	The Paramour Sessions	
"Forever"	2007	Meiert Avis	Narrative	The Paramour Sessions	
"What Do You Do?" (web video)	2007	Unknown	Live performance	The Paramour Sessions	
"Reckless" (web video)	2007	Devin DeHaven	Live performance	The Paramour Sessions	
"Hollywood Whore"	2008	Jesse Davey	Performance	Metamorphosis	
"Lifeline"	2009	Chris Sims	Narrative	Metamorphosis	
"I Almost Told You That I Loved You"	2009	Colin Minihan	Performance	Metamorphosis	
"Kick in the Teeth"	2010	Shane Drake	Performance	Time for Annihilation	
"Burn"	2010	Jesse Davey	Performance	Time for Annihilation	
"No Matter What"	2011	Jesse Davey	Narrative	Time for Annihilation	
"No Matter What" (acoustic)	2011	Unknown	Performance	Time for Annihilation	
"One Track Mind"	2012	Unknown	Live performance	Time for Annihilation	
"Still Swingin"	2012	David Brodsky	Narrative	The Connection	
"Where Did The Angels Go"	2012	Ezio Lucido	Performance	The Connection	
"Before I Die"	2012	Ezio Lucido	Narrative	The Connection	
"Leader of the Broken Hearts"	2013	Ezio Lucido	Narrative	The Connection	
"Face Everything and Rise"	2014	Ezio Lucido and Jacoby Shaddix	Narrative	F.E.A.R.	
"Gravity"	2015	Ezio Lucido and Jacoby Shaddix	Narrative	F.E.A.R.	
"Falling Apart"	2016	Jesse Davey	Narrative	F.E.A.R.	
"Crooked Teeth"	2017	Bryson Roatch	Performance	Crooked Teeth	
"Help"	2017	Darren Craig	Narrative	Crooked Teeth	
"Periscope" (featuring Skylar Grey)	2017	Unknown	Performance	Crooked Teeth	
"Periscope" (featuring Skylar Grey) (alternate video)	2017	Darren Craig	Performance	Crooked Teeth	
"American Dreams"	2017	Bryson Roatch	Performance	Crooked Teeth	
"Born for Greatness" (live)	2017	Bryson Roatch	Live performance	Crooked Teeth	
"Traumatic"	2017	Bryson Roatch	Performance	Crooked Teeth	
"Born for Greatness"	2018	Bryson Roatch	Narrative	Crooked Teeth	
"My Medication"	2018	Bryson Roatch	Narrative	Crooked Teeth	
"None of the Above"	2018	Bryson Roatch	Performance	Crooked Teeth	
"Who Do You Trust?"	2018	Darren Craig	Narrative	Who Do You Trust?	
"Elevate"	2019	Caleb Mallery	Performance	Who Do You Trust?	
"Not the Only One"	2019	Bryson Roatch	Narrative	Who Do You Trust?	
"Come Around"	2019	Bryson Roatch	Narrative	Who Do You Trust?	
"Top of the World"	2020	Bryson Roatch	Performance	Who Do You Trust?	
"Feel Like Home"	2020	Bryson Roatch	Performance	Who Do You Trust?	
"The Ending"	2020	Samuel Gonzalez Jr.	Performance	Who Do You Trust?	
"Broken as Me" (featuring Danny Worsnop of Asking Alexandria)	2021	Unknown	Narrative	Greatest Hits Vol. 2: The Better Noise Years	
"Swerve" (featuring Fever 333 and Sueco)	2021	Darren Craig	Narrative	Ego Trip	
"Kill the Noise"	2021	Bryson Roatch	Performance	Ego Trip	
"Stand Up"	2022	Bryson Roatch	Performance	Ego Trip	
"Cut the Line"	2022	Bryson Roatch	Performance	Ego Trip	
"No Apologies"	2022	Darren Craig	Narrative	Ego Trip	
"Ego Trip"	2022	Bryson Roatch	Performance	Ego Trip	
"Leave a Light On"	2023	Bryson Roatch	Live performance	Ego Trip	
"Leave a Light On" (with Carrie Underwood)	2024	Bryson Roatch and Jeff Johnson	Performance	Ego Trip	
"Even If It Kills Me	2025	Jesse Davey and Ed Shiers	Narrative		
"Even If It Kills Me (Reimagined)"	2025	Jesse Davey and Ed Shiers	Narrative		
"Braindead" (featuring Toby Morse)	2025	Jesse Davey and Ed Shiers	Narrative		
"Wake Up Calling"	2026	Hannah Gray Hall	Narrative		
"See U In Hell" (feat. Hanumankind)	2026	Jonah Harber	Performance		
