= ...To Be Loved: The Best of Papa Roach =

Compilation album by Papa Roach
- Released: June 29, 2010
- Recorded: 1999–2009
- Genre: Alternative rock; hard rock; nu metal; rap metal
- Length: 49:03
- Label: Geffen
- Producer: Jeff Fura

Papa Roach chronology
Naked and Fearless: Acoustic EP (2009)	...To Be Loved: The Best of Papa Roach (2010)	Time for Annihilation: On the Record & On the Road (2010)

Professional ratings
Review scores
Source	Rating
AllMusic	3/5 stars

...To Be Loved: The Best of Papa Roach is the first compilation album by American rock band Papa Roach. It was released on June 29, 2010. It was the band's final album with Geffen Records, after the band left for Eleven Seven Music. The album omits one of the band's biggest singles, "Between Angels and Insects", which was a top 20 hit in the UK. The band members themselves asked their fans not to buy this CD (as well as expressed their resentment towards Geffen/Interscope) because they do not endorse this release, nor would they receive royalties for its sales.

== Track listing ==
All tracks are written by Jacoby Shaddix and Tobin Esperance, unless where noted.

No.	Title	Writer(s)	Length
1.	"Broken Home" (Infest)	Jacoby Shaddix; Tobin Esperance; Dave Buckner; Jerry Horton	3:41
2.	"Last Resort" (Infest)	Shaddix; Esperance; Buckner; Horton	3:20
3.	"Time and Time Again" (Lovehatetragedy)	Shaddix; Esperance	2:58
4.	"She Loves Me Not" (Lovehatetragedy)	Shaddix; Esperance	3:31
5.	"Scars" (Getting Away with Murder)	Shaddix; Esperance	3:28
6.	"Getting Away with Murder" (Getting Away with Murder)	Shaddix; Esperance; Horton	3:10
7.	"Just Go (Never Look Back)" (previously unreleased)	Shaddix; Esperance	2:56
8.	"...To Be Loved" (The Paramour Sessions)	Shaddix; Esperance	3:01
9.	"Reckless" (The Paramour Sessions)	Shaddix; Esperance; Buckner	3:33
10.	"Had Enough (acoustic)" (Naked and Fearless: Acoustic EP)	Shaddix; Esperance; Horton	4:14
11.	"Forever" (live session)	Shaddix; Esperance; Buckner; Horton	3:38
12.	"Hollywood Whore" (Metamorphosis)	Shaddix; Esperance; Horton	3:55
13.	"Lifeline" (Metamorphosis)	Shaddix; Esperance; James Michael	4:28
14.	"Scars (acoustic)" ("Scars")	Shaddix; Esperance	3:10
Total length:			49:03

== Best Buy DVD ==
No.	Title	Length
1.	"Last Resort"
2.	"Broken Home"
3.	"Dead Cell"
4.	"Between Angels and Insects"
5.	"She Loves Me Not"
6.	"Time and Time Again"
7.	"Getting Away with Murder"
8.	"Scars"
9.	"...To Be Loved"
10.	"Forever"
11.	"What Do You Do?"
12.	"Hollywood Whore"
13.	"I Almost Told You That I Loved You"
14.	"Lifeline"

Bonus videos

No.	Title	Length
1.	"Time and Time Again" (alternative version)
2.	"Scars" (alternative version)
3.	"Forever" (alternative version)

Making of the Video

No.	Title	Length
1.	"Hollywood Whore"
2.	"I Almost Told You That I Loved You"
3.	"Lifeline"

== Import DVD ==
No.	Title	Length
1.	"Last Resort"
2.	"Broken Home"
3.	"Dead Cell" (live mix)
4.	"Between Angels and Insects"
5.	"She Loves Me Not"
6.	"Time and Time Again"
7.	"Getting Away with Murder"
8.	"Scars" (version two)
9.	"...To Be Loved"
10.	"Forever" (version two)
11.	"What Do You Do?" (website video)
12.	"Reckless" (website video)
13.	"Hollywood Whore"
14.	"I Almost Told You That I Loved You"
15.	"Lifeline"

Bonus videos

No.	Title	Length
1.	"Infest to Metamorphosis" (Interview with the band about the past 10 years of recording.)

Making of the Video

No.	Title	Length
1.	"Hollywood Whore"
2.	"I Almost Told You That I Loved You"
3.	"Lifeline"

== Sales ==
The album debuted at number 83 on the US Billboard 200 with 5,554 copies sold in its first week of release. It was certified Gold in the United Kingdom by the British Phonographic Industry (BPI) on July 10, 2026.

== Certifications ==
Region	Certification	Certified units/sales
United Kingdom (BPI)	Gold	100,000^{‡}
^{‡} Sales+streaming figures based on certification alone.

== Personnel ==
- Jacoby Shaddix – lead vocals
- Jerry Horton – guitar, backing vocals
- Tobin Esperance – bass, backing vocals
- Dave Buckner – drums
- Tony Palermo – drums on tracks 10, 12, and 13
