= Time for Annihilation: On the Record & On the Road =

Live album with studio tracks by Papa Roach
- Released: August 31, 2010
- Recorded: December 2009; January–March 2010
- Length: 60:16
- Label: Eleven Seven
- Producer: David Bendeth

Papa Roach chronology
...To Be Loved: The Best of Papa Roach (2010)	Time for Annihilation: On the Record & On the Road (2010)	The Connection (2012)

Singles from Time for Annihilation
- 1. "Kick in the Teeth" Released: June 22, 2010; 2. "Burn" Released: November 26, 2010; 3. "No Matter What" Released: June 2011; 4. "One Track Mind" Released: September 1, 2011

Time for Annihilation: On the Record & On the Road is the first live album by the American rock band Papa Roach. It was released on August 31, 2010. Jerry Horton said in a blog on the band's official website that they recorded it on the last run of the tour with Shinedown. Later, Jacoby Shaddix reported on the site that five entirely new tracks had been written and would be studio recorded and released with the Time for Annihilation album. The first single, "Kick in the Teeth", was released on June 22, 2010. The album's name is a lyric quote from the song "Crash" from the band's 2006 album, The Paramour Sessions.

== Background ==
In January 2010, the band also said on their website that they would release "Big News" soon. In February, Jerry Horton confirmed that the "Big News" was the announcement of a live album, which they recorded during five shows of their 2009 co-headlining tour with Shinedown. They were also recording five new songs for it, making it a combination of a studio and a live album.

In March, Shaddix said he was recording vocals for songs called "Nemesis" and "No Matter What". That month, the band also released the teaser for the live album, confirming the release date to be in summer 2010. In June, on Nikki Sixx's radio show, Sixx Sense, Shaddix confirmed that one of the new songs was called "One Track Mind". The song was previously titled "Nemesis" but was changed to "One Track Mind" after he changed the chorus.

On June 29, the band's former label, Geffen Records, released a greatest hits compilation of the band's biggest hits, titled ...To Be Loved: The Best of Papa Roach. The band, however, told fans not to buy it.

In an interview with Upvenue, Tobin Esperance explained that Time for Annihilation was really just the end of a decade of Papa Roach. "We put out five major label, full-length records, and we were transitioning from a major label, going independent, and we wanted to do something different [...] we'd always talked about doing a live record, and it turned into 'let's add a couple of bonus songs' [...] and now it's half live, half new songs and it's kind of the past and present of Papa Roach, and I think it's a good representation and a good reminder of what this band's about, [...] and it gives you a look at where our sound can go."

== Critical reception ==
Professional ratings
Aggregate scores
Source	Rating
Metacritic	58/100
Review scores
Source	Rating
AllMusic	2.5/5 stars
Kerrang!	4/5 stars
PopMatters	7/10
Rock Sound	7/10 stars
Type 3 Media	6.5/10 stars

According to the review aggregator Metacritic, Time for Annihilation: On the Record & On the Road received "mixed or average reviews" based on a weighted average score of 58 out of 100 from 6 critic scores.

== Hidden message ==
On the album there is a special message recorded by Shaddix, at the last 0:39 of "Last Resort (Live)". The message encourages fans to help fight homelessness and hunger. He asks fans to take out their phones and to text a number to WhyHunger to donate $5 to them.

== Track listing ==
All tracks are written by Jacoby Shaddix and Tobin Esperance, unless where noted.

No.	Title	Writer(s)	Length
1.	"Burn"	Jacoby Shaddix; Tobin Esperance; Bobby Huff	3:25
2.	"One Track Mind"	Jacoby Shaddix; Tobin Esperance; James Michael; David Bendeth	3:25
3.	"Kick in the Teeth"	Jacoby Shaddix; Tobin Esperance; Huff	3:11
4.	"No Matter What"	Jacoby Shaddix; Tobin Esperance; James Michael; David Bendeth	3:33
5.	"The Enemy"	Jacoby Shaddix; Tobin Esperance; Bendeth	3:38
6.	"Getting Away with Murder (from Getting Away with Murder)" (live)	Jacoby Shaddix; Tobin Esperance; Jerry Horton	4:14
7.	"...To Be Loved (from The Paramour Sessions)" (live)	Shaddix; Esperance	3:55
8.	"Lifeline (from Metamorphosis)" (live)	Shaddix; Esperance; Michael	4:18
9.	"Scars (from Getting Away with Murder)" (live)	Shaddix; Esperance	4:59
10.	"Hollywood Whore (from Metamorphosis)" (live)	Shaddix; Esperance; Horton	4:08
11.	"Time Is Running Out (from The Paramour Sessions)" (live)	Shaddix; Esperance	3:57
12.	"Forever (from The Paramour Sessions)" (live)	Shaddix; Esperance; Dave Buckner; Horton	6:50
13.	"Between Angels and Insects (from Infest)" (live)	Shaddix; Esperance; Buckner; Horton	5:09
14.	"Last Resort (from Infest)" (live)	Shaddix; Esperance; Buckner; Horton	5:39
Total length:			60:16

Deluxe Edition And 2025 Reissue CD bonus tracks

No.	Title	Writer(s)	Length
15.	"I Almost Told You That I Loved You (from Metamorphosis)" (live)	Shaddix; Esperance; Michael	3:15
16.	"Dead Cell (from Infest)" (live)	Shaddix; Esperance; Buckner; Horton	6:09
17.	"No Matter What" (demo)	Shaddix; Esperance; Michael; Bendeth	4:06

Deluxe Edition DVD

No.	Title	Length
1.	"Kick in the Teeth" (live)	3:15
2.	"Kick in the Teeth" (music video)	3:11
3.	"EPK (Inside Look)" (video)	6:16

== Personnel ==
- Jacoby Shaddix – lead vocals
- Jerry Horton – guitar, backing vocals
- Tobin Esperance – bass guitar, backing vocals
- Tony Palermo – drums

== Charts ==
Chart (2010)	Peak position
Austrian Albums Chart	38
Belgium Albums Chart	54
Germany Albums Chart	40
Japanese Albums Chart	255
Scottish Albums	83
Swiss Albums Chart	64
UK Albums Chart	71
US Billboard 200	23
US Top Rock Albums (Billboard)	9
