= Hit 3 Pack: Forever =

EP by Papa Roach
- Released: July 24, 2007
- Genre: Alternative rock; hard rock
- Length: 10:38
- Label: Geffen
- Producer: Howard Benson

Papa Roach chronology
The Paramour Sessions (2006)	Hit 3 Pack: Forever (2007)	Metamorphosis (2009)

Hit 3 Pack: Forever is the seventh EP by American rock band Papa Roach. The EP is only available digitally. It features three of the band's biggest hits. Two were from the Paramour Sessions, while "Scars" was from the album prior, Getting Away With Murder.

== Track listing ==
All tracks are written by Jacoby Shaddix and Tobin Esperance, unless where noted.

No.	Title	Writer(s)	Length
1.	"Forever" (Edited)	Jacoby Shaddix, Tobin Esperance, Dave Buckner, Jerry Horton	4:07
2.	"Scars"	Shaddix, Esperance	3:29
3.	"...To Be Loved" (Edited)	Shaddix, Esperance	3:02
Total length:			10:38

== Personnel ==
- Jacoby Shaddix - lead vocals
- Jerry Horton - guitar, backing vocals
- Tobin Esperance - bass, backing vocals
- Dave Buckner - drums
