= Naked and Fearless =

Naked and Fearless: Acoustic EP

EP by Papa Roach
- Released: June 23, 2009
- Recorded: 2009 in Nashville, Tennessee
- Genre: Acoustic rock, alternative rock
- Length: 12:10
- Label: DGC/Interscope
- Producer: James Michael

Papa Roach chronology
Metamorphosis (2009)	Naked and Fearless: Acoustic EP (2009)	...To Be Loved: The Best of Papa Roach (2010)

Naked and Fearless: Acoustic EP is the eighth EP by American rock band Papa Roach. The EP is only available digitally. It features three acoustic versions of songs from their 2009 album Metamorphosis. The acoustic version of "Had Enough" is featured on the ...To Be Loved: The Best of Papa Roach album.

== Track listing ==
All tracks are written by Jacoby Shaddix and Tobin Esperance, unless where noted.

No.	Title	Writer(s)	Length
1.	"Lifeline" (Acoustic Version)	Jacoby Shaddix, Tobin Esperance, James Michael	3:42
2.	"Had Enough" (Acoustic Version)	Shaddix, Esperance, Jerry Horton	4:16
3.	"Carry Me" (Acoustic Version)	Shaddix, Esperance	4:12
Total length:			12:10

== Personnel ==
- Jacoby Shaddix - lead vocals
- Jerry Horton - guitars, backing vocals
- Tobin Esperance - bass guitar, backing vocals
- Tony Palermo - drums, percussion
