= Even If It Kills Me (song) =

2025 single by Papa Roach

Single by Papa Roach
- Released: January 22, 2025; March 26, 2025 (Reimagined version)
- Recorded: 2023
- Genre: Alternative rock
- Length: 3:32
- Label: New Noize
- Songwriters: Jacoby Shaddix; Tobin Esperance; Anthony Esperance; Drew Fulk; Andrew Goldstein
- Producer: Drew Fulk

Papa Roach singles chronology
| "Leave a Light On (Talk Away the Dark)" (2023) | "Even If It Kills Me" (2025) | "Braindead" (2025) |

Music video
- "Even If It Kills Me" on YouTube

"Even If It Kills Me" is a song by American rock band Papa Roach. It was released as a single on January 22, 2025, through New Noize Records/ADA. It reached No. 1 on the Billboard Mainstream Rock Airplay chart in March 2025.

== Background and release ==
"Even If It Kills Me" is Papa Roach's first single since 2023's collaboration with Carrie Underwood, "Leave a Light On (Talk Away the Dark)". The initial music for the track began about two years before its release, and the single release coincided with the "Rise of the Roach tour".

Jacoby Shaddix said the song was inspired by his son going through what he called a "traumatic life upheaval". He compared it to watching him "walk through fire" and said he wanted to carry the pain for him during that time.

== Composition ==
According to NME, the song is a return to Papa Roach's alternative hard-rock roots. Revolver described the song as dark and anthemic, built for large audiences, and centered on people facing hardship and supporting one another.

== Critical reception ==
Loudwire included the song in its "51 Best Rock + Metal Songs of 2025", citing its blend of veteran experience and youthful angst, as well as Shaddix's commanding vocals and emotional honesty.

== Music video ==
An animated official lyric video was released alongside the single in January 2025. The live-action music video, directed by Jesse Davey and Ed Shires, was released shortly after the single. Shaddix described it as one of their most epic videos and said it allowed him to explore his "inner action hero". The reimagined version was released alongside an official music video that continues the narrative from the original. In late May 2025, an acoustic music video was released for the track.

== Notable live performances ==
| Date | City | Venue | Notes |
|---|---|---|---|
| January 21, 2025 | Berlin, Germany | Huxley's Neue Welt | Live premiere of "Even If It Kills Me" |
| April 24, 2025 | Detroit, Michigan, US | Riff Lounge | Intimate acoustic 'Riff Session'; Shaddix performed a brief metal-style vocal flourish during the finale. |
| February 10, 2025 | London, UK | Wembley Arena | Opened live show with "Even If It Kills Me"; stage featured a roach-adorned curtain, LED screens, and pyrotechnics. |

== Track listing ==
Even If It Kills Me - by Papa Roach Single
| No. | Title | Length |
|---|---|---|
| 1. | "Even If It Kills Me" | 3:32 |

Even If It Kills Me (Reimagined) - by Papa Roach Single
| No. | Title | Length |
|---|---|---|
| 1. | "Even If It Kills Me (Reimagined)" | 2:54 |
| 2. | "Even If It Kills Me" | 3:32 |
| Total length: | | 6:26 |

== Commercial performance ==
According to Blabbermouth, it accumulated nearly 10 million streams and charted in 27 countries within the first five weeks.

== Chart performance ==
It reached No. 1 on the Billboard Mainstream Rock Airplay chart on March 22, 2025, their eleventh song to do so.

== Personnel ==
Papa Roach

- Jacoby Shaddix – vocals, songwriting
- Jerry Horton – guitar
- Tobin Esperance – bass, songwriting
- Tony Palermo – drums

Production and additional credits

- Anthony Esperance – touring guitar, songwriting
- Drew Fulk – production, songwriting
- Joshua Landry – production (Reimagined version)
- Andrew Goldstein – songwriting
- Jesse Davey – music video direction
- Ed Shires – music video direction

== Charts ==
=== Weekly charts ===
Weekly chart performance for "Even If It Kills Me"
| Chart (2025–2026) | Peak position |
|---|---|
| Canada Mainstream Rock (Billboard Canada) | 1 |
| Czech Republic Airplay (ČNS IFPI) | 16 |
| Czech Republic Modern Rock (ČNS IFPI) | 1 |
| Germany Airplay (TopHit) | 29 |
| US Hot Rock & Alternative Songs (Billboard) | 39 |
| US Rock & Alternative Airplay (Billboard) | 2 |
| US Mainstream Rock Airplay (Billboard) | 1 |

=== Year-end charts ===
Year-end chart performance for "Even If It Kills Me"
| Chart (2025) | Position |
|---|---|
| Canada Mainstream Rock (Billboard) | 4 |
| US Rock & Alternative Airplay Songs (Billboard) | 2 |
| US Mainstream Rock Airplay (Billboard) | 7 |

== Release history ==
Digital download + streaming
| Type | Date | Format |
|---|---|---|
| Original version | January 22, 2025 | digital download / streaming |
| Reimagined version | March 26, 2025 | digital download / streaming |
| Acoustic version | May 27, 2025 | streaming |
