= Old Friends from Young Years =

Studio album by Papa Roach
- Released: February 4, 1997
- Recorded: 1996
- Studio: E.S.P Studios; (Pittsburg, California)
- Genre: Nu metal; rap metal
- Length: 49:04
- Label: Onion Hardcore
- Producer: Papa Roach

Papa Roach chronology
Caca Bonita (1995)	Old Friends from Young Years (1997)	Infest (2000)

Alternative cover
- Fan club edition

Professional ratings
Review scores
Source	Rating
AllMusic	4/5 stars
ThePRP	5/5 stars

Old Friends from Young Years is the debut studio album by American rock band Papa Roach, self-produced and released on February 4, 1997. This album, along with their other independent demos, were released on the band's now defunct indie label, Onion Hardcore, so named because onion farming is a staple of Papa Roach's hometown, Vacaville, California.

== Background ==
The album was co-produced by bassist Tobin Esperance's father, who included an audio recording of Tobin as a child as a bonus track on the album. Old Friends from Young Years is the band's only album to feature original bassist Will James and fill-in drummer Ryan Brown, as a few of the album's songs were initially conceived during their respective tenures in the band. Ultimately, the lineup at the time of the album's release was Jacoby Shaddix on vocals, Jerry Horton on guitar, Dave Buckner on drums, and Tobin Esperance on bass.

In 2005, Papa Roach re-released the album exclusively to new members to their fan club, P-Roach Riot!. The fan club edition had a new cover and included a sticker and an official membership card to the fan club. The first 2,000 copies were signed by all four members of the band. The tracks "Thanx" and "Happy Birthday" are excluded from the re-release. The track "Grrbrr" is not listed on the back cover, but the song is on the CD. There is a hidden track at the end of the album, the rock demo of "Tightrope", previously only available on the EP Let 'Em Know.

== Track listing ==
All tracks are written by Papa Roach.

No.	Title	Length
1.	"intro"	0:28
2.	"Orange Drive Palms"	4:53
3.	"Liquid Diet"	4:19
4.	"GrrBrr"	4:14
5.	"iSEDuF**nDie"	4:16
6.	"DIRTYcutFREAK"	2:45
7.	"Living Room"	4:14
8.	"829"	4:35
9.	"Peewagon"	4:43
10.	"hedake"	5:20
11.	"Shut Up N Die (reprise)"	2:33
12.	"Thanx"	4:50
13.	"Happy Birthday"	1:54
Total length:		49:04

=== Fan club edition ===
No.	Title	Length
1.	"intro"	0:27
2.	"Orange Drive Palms"	4:54
3.	"Liquid Diet"	4:22
4.	"GrrBrr"	4:14
5.	"iSEDuF**nDie"	4:16
6.	"DIRTYcutFREAK"	2:46
7.	"Living Room"	3:59
8.	"829"	4:34
9.	"Peewagon"	4:43
10.	"hedake"	5:22
11.	"Shut Up N Die (reprise)"	2:36
12.	"Tightrope (Rock Demo)"	3:33
Total length:		45:46

== Personnel ==
Papa Roach

- Jacoby Shaddix – lead vocals
- Jerry Horton – guitar, backing vocals
- Dave Buckner – drums, artwork
- Tobin Esperance – bass

Other personnel

- Ryan Brown – additional drums
- Will James – additional bass
- Tony Esperance – co-producer
- Greg Patterson – engineer on "Living Room"
- Ben Johnston – engineer on "Thanx"
