= Metamorphosis (Papa Roach album) =

Studio album by Papa Roach
- Released: March 24, 2009
- Studios: NRG Recording Services (North Hollywood, California); The Lightning Bolt Garage (Eagle Rock, California); Big3 Entertainment (St Petersburg, Florida); Studio 4 (Conshohocken, Pennsylvania); The Lodge Recording Studios (Indianapolis, Indiana)
- Genres: Glam metal, hard rock
- Length: 46:25
- Labels: DGC, Interscope
- Producers: Jay Baumgardner, James Michael

Papa Roach chronology
Hit 3 Pack: Forever (2007)	Metamorphosis (2009)	Naked and Fearless: Acoustic EP (2009)

Singles from Metamorphosis
- 1. "Hollywood Whore" Released: October 28, 2008; 2. "Lifeline" Released: February 2, 2009; 3. "I Almost Told You That I Loved You" Released: June 1, 2009; 4. "Had Enough" Released: 2009

Metamorphosis is the sixth studio album by American rock band Papa Roach. It was released by DGC and Interscope on March 24, 2009. The album was originally planned to be titled Days of War, Nights of Love, which is a lyrical quote from the song "No More Secrets" on the band's previous album, The Paramour Sessions. Subsequently, two songs on the album are titled "Days of War" and "Nights of Love". It is the first album to feature Tony Palermo on drums, who joined the band in 2007 after original drummer Dave Buckner's departure.

== Background information ==
On May 17, 2008, Papa Roach performed two new songs at the Nashville, Tennessee Crawfish Boil, "Hanging On" and "Change or Die". "Hanging On" was later renamed to "Lifeline" after Jacoby Shaddix decided to change the chorus lyrics. A third song from the album was performed on July 1 in West Palm Beach, Florida at the Cruzan Amphitheatre, titled "I Almost Told You That I Loved You". It was then that vocalist Jacoby Shaddix announced the album's planned release date of August 26. However, Shaddix later mentioned the album's release date had been pushed to March 2009 on Pulse Radio, citing, "We want a new fresh year, a great start".

Mötley Crüe lead guitarist Mick Mars played the guitar solo on the track "Into the Light".

On October 26, 2008, the song "Hollywood Whore" was released as a music video through the band's official fan club website, before being formally released as an EP in Canada two days later. In other regions, the song became available as a digital single through iTunes.

== Reception ==
Professional ratings
Aggregate scores
Source	Rating
Metacritic	46/100
Review scores
Source	Rating
AllMusic	2.5/5 stars
Cokemachineglow	36%
Consequence of Sound	D−
God Is in the TV	3/5
Hot Press	2/5
IGN	5.9/10
Rock Sound	3.5/5 stars
Rolling Stone	2/5 stars
Sputnikmusic	2/5

According to the review aggregator Metacritic, Metamorphosis received "mixed or average reviews" based on a weighted average score of 46 out of 100 from 5 critic scores. Chris Fallon of AbsolutePunk.net said about the album, "Big anthems, Jonas Brother album cover, lyrics that weave in & out of ambition-slash-unified hope and back-alley corners? Too many times the band takes one step forward and two steps back, at least showing some minimal signs of life in a dying genre built on repetition. Shaddix has a solid voice for this sound, and Horton seems to be discovering a new use for his distortion pedal, there are just far too many cliches in the ocean Papa Roach is trying to swim across, and the band can't seem to cope with their identity". Stephen Thomas Erlewine of Allmusic observes that the album has "a dire determination to its purported good times, it's riffs grinding instead of greasy, its rhythms clenched where they should be loose. While Papa Roach is a long long way from the depths of Hinder — that decade of work does give the band a professional snap, plus it never quite seems that Jacoby Shaddix's heart is into slagging that 'Hollywood Whore' he berates on the album's first single—they miss the whole point of this kind of rock & roll raunch: it should be more fun to listen to than it is to take out on the road".

== Sales ==
The album landed at number eight in the Billboard 200, selling 44,000 copies in its first week. Despite its strong debut on the chart, Metamorphosis quickly slid out of the top 20 and charted at number 35 in its second week. In Canada, the album peaked on the Canadian Albums Chart for a solitary week at number 14.

== Track listing ==
No.	Title	Lyrics	Music	Length
1.	"Days of War" (instrumental)"		Tobin Esperance; Jerry Horton	1:25
2.	"Change or Die"	Jacoby Shaddix	Horton; Esperance	3:19
3.	"Hollywood Whore"	Shaddix	Esperance; Horton	3:54
4.	"I Almost Told You That I Loved You"	Shaddix; James Michael	Esperance	3:12
5.	"Lifeline"	Shaddix; Michael	Esperance	4:18
6.	"Had Enough"	Shaddix	Esperance; Horton	4:02
7.	"Live This Down"	Shaddix; Michael	Esperance	3:36
8.	"March Out of the Darkness"	Shaddix	Esperance; Horton	4:22
9.	"Into the Light"	Shaddix	Esperance; Horton	3:28
10.	"Carry Me"	Shaddix	Esperance	4:26
11.	"Nights of Love"	Shaddix	Horton; Esperance	5:16
12.	"State of Emergency"	Shaddix; Michael	Esperance	5:07
Total length:				46:25

UK edition

No.	Title	Writer(s)	Length
13.	"She Loves Me Not" (live in Chicago)	Shaddix; Esperance	3:45
14.	"Broken Home" (live in Chicago)	Shaddix; Esperance; Dave Buckner; Horton	3:48

Japan edition

No.	Title	Writer(s)	Length
13.	"She Loves Me Not" (live in Chicago)	Shaddix; Esperance	3:45
14.	"Broken Home" (live in Chicago)	Shaddix; Esperance; Buckner; Horton	3:48
15.	"Last Resort" (live in Chicago)	Shaddix; Esperance; Buckner; Horton	6:31

Japan bonus DVD

No.	Title	Length
1.	"Hollywood Whore" (music video)
2.	"Lifeline" (music video)
3.	"Forever" (music video)

== Personnel ==
Papa Roach

- Jacoby Shaddix – lead vocals
- Jerry Horton – guitar, backing vocals
- Tobin Esperance – bass, backing vocals
- Tony Palermo – drums

Additional musicians

- Guitar solo on "Into the Light" by Mick Mars
- Organ on "Nights of Love" by James Michael

Production

- Produced by Jay Baumgardner
- Co-produced by James Michael
- Additional production by Marti Frederiksen
- Additional production by Mitch Allan
- Audio mixing by Mike Shipley at the Animal House
- Audio mastering by Ted Jensen at Sterling Sound NYC
- Audio engineering by Casey Lewis
- Assistant engineering by Dave Colvin
- Additional engineering on "I Almost Told You That I Loved You", "Live This Down", "State of Emergency", "Lifeline", "Nights of Love", "Into the Light" "Change or Die" by James Michael

== Charts ==
=== Weekly charts ===
Weekly chart performance for Metamorphosis
Chart (2009)	Peak position
Australian Albums (ARIA)	74
Austrian Albums (Ö3 Austria)	12
Belgian Albums (Ultratop Flanders)	50
Belgian Albums (Ultratop Wallonia)	100
Canadian Albums (Billboard)	14
German Albums (Offizielle Top 100)	23
Japanese Albums (Oricon)	44
Japanese Top Album Sales (Billboard)	66
New Zealand Albums (RMNZ)	36
Scottish Albums (Official Charts)	51
Swiss Albums (Schweizer Hitparade)	21
UK Albums (Official Charts)	42
UK R&B Albums (Official Charts)	3
US Billboard 200	8
US Top Alternative Albums (Billboard)	3
US Top Hard Rock Albums (Billboard)	2
US Top Rock Albums (Billboard)	3

=== Year-end charts ===
Year-end chart performance for Metamorphosis
Chart (2009)	Position
US Billboard 200	194

== Certifications ==
Certifications for Metamorphosis
Region	Certification	Certified units/sales
United Kingdom (BPI)	Silver	60,000^{‡}
^{‡} Sales+streaming figures based on certification alone.
