= Hollywood Whore =

Single by Papa Roach

from the album Metamorphosis
- Released: October 28, 2008
- Recorded: February 2008–May 2008 at the Paramour Mansion in Hollywood, California
- Genre: Hard rock; alternative metal
- Length: 3:57
- Label: DGC; Interscope
- Songwriters: Jacoby Shaddix; Tobin Esperance; Jerry Horton
- Producers: Jay Baumgardner; James Michael

Papa Roach singles chronology
"Forever" (2007)	"Hollywood Whore" (2008)	"Lifeline" (2009)

Music video
- "Hollywood Whore" on YouTube

"Hollywood Whore" is the first single from Californian rock band Papa Roach's sixth album, Metamorphosis, and tenth released single in total. It was first released as music video only on October 26, 2008, available as a free download from the band's official site, and on October 28, it became available as both a limited edition Canada exclusive EP and a digital single on iTunes. Despite this, it was never officially released to the radio and received limited airplay.

== Music video ==
The music video, directed by Jesse Davey, depicts the band playing in front of a young woman, the "Hollywood Whore" to whom the song is referring. Eventually, the woman arises and blood is seen falling from her eyes. The skin and muscle on her face deteriorates and turns to that of a bloody skull, and blood begins to explode out of her mouth, completely drenching the band as they are performing.

== Track listing ==
No.	Title	Length
1.	"Hollywood Whore" (album version)

EP

No.	Title	Length
1.	"Hollywood Whore" (album version)
2.	"Getting Away With Murder" (Live in Chicago)
3.	"Scars" (Live in Chicago)

== Reviews ==
Blog Critics reviewer Jordan Richardson, in reviewing the album Metamorphosis states, "'Live This Down' kicks a little ass as a pretty catty revenge tune and 'Hollywood Whore' works well enough on similar ground." Reviewer Dan Marsicano also speaks favorably of the song in his review of the album, stating, "After a short instrumental, 'Change Or Die' hits the speakers with a blast of rock that can only be described as a firm kick in the ass... 'Hollywood Whore' continues this upward momentum with a hard-hitting tune that has Shaddix ranting about the glorification of the entertainment industry. 'Sorry, but the party’s over,' Shaddix yells at the top of his lungs, letting everybody know that Papa Roach is ready with gas can in hand to burn everything to the ground." Press Association music reviewer Nick Howes says the song "invokes memories of classic Mötley Crüe".

== Chart performance ==
Chart (2008)	Peak positions
Czech Republic Rock (IFPI)	6
UK Singles (OCC)	139
US Mainstream Rock (Billboard)	37
