= Papa Roach: Live & Murderous in Chicago =

Video by Papa Roach
- Released: November 22, 2005
- Recorded: May 1, 2005 at The Vic Theatre in Chicago, Illinois
- Genre: Hard rock, alternative rock, alternative metal, nu metal
- Length: 75:33
- Label: Geffen
- Director: Devin DeHaven
- Producer: Devin DeHaven

Papa Roach chronology
Papa Roach: Live & Murderous in Chicago (2005)	Crüe Fest (2009)

Professional ratings
Review scores
Source	Rating
antiMUSIC.com	5/5 stars
Melodic	2.5/5 stars

Papa Roach: Live & Murderous in Chicago is the first DVD by Californian rock band Papa Roach. It was released in the United States on November 22, 2005 and features the band performing live at The Vic Theatre in Chicago, Illinois. Extras include all of the band's music videos from their career to date, a photo gallery, and a hidden easter egg. The DVD was produced and directed by Devin DeHaven through his company, FortressDVD. The concert has also been aired on HDNet.

== Track listing ==
1. Introduction
2. Dead Cell
3. Not Listening
4. She Loves Me Not
5. M-80 (Explosive Energy Movement)
6. Getting Away with Murder
7. Be Free
8. Life Is a Bullet
9. Blood (Empty Promises)
10. Done With You
11. Harder Than a Coffin Nail
12. Blood Brothers
13. Born with Nothing, Die with Everything
14. Infest
15. Take Me
16. Scars
17. Broken Home
18. Cocaine (Queens of the Stone Age cover)
19. Last Resort
20. Between Angels and Insects
21. End Credits

== Bonus material ==
- Music videos
  - "Last Resort"
  - "Broken Home"
  - "Between Angels and Insects"
  - "She Loves Me Not"
  - "Time and Time Again"
  - "Getting Away with Murder"
  - "Scars"
- Photo gallery
- Easter egg (To find, go to the audio selection screen, highlight main menu, press left and then enter.)

== Personnel ==
- Jacoby Shaddix - lead vocals
- Jerry Horton - lead guitar, backing vocals
- Tobin Esperance - bass guitar, backing vocals
- Dave Buckner - drums, percussion
