= Lifeline (Papa Roach song) =

2009 single by Papa Roach

Single by Papa Roach

from the album Metamorphosis
- Released: February 10, 2009
- Recorded: February 2008 – May 2008 at the Paramour Mansion in Hollywood, Los Angeles, California
- Genre: Alternative rock
- Length: 4:18 (album version); 4:06 (single version)
- Label: DGC; Interscope
- Songwriters: Jacoby Shaddix; Tobin Esperance; James Michael
- Producers: Jay Baumgardner; James Michael

Papa Roach singles chronology
"Hollywood Whore" (2008)	"Lifeline" (2009)	"I Almost Told You That I Loved You" (2009)

Music video
- "Lifeline" on YouTube

"Lifeline" is the second single from American rock band Papa Roach's fifth album, Metamorphosis, and eleventh released single in total. The song was originally titled "Hanging On", and was changed to "Lifeline" after lead singer Jacoby Shaddix decided to alter the lyrics of the chorus. It was released to iTunes on January 27, 2009 and as a Hot Topic exclusive CD single on February 10. An accompanying music video was released on March 6, 2009. To launch this song in its truest form, the band filmed "Lifeline" live during Crüe Fest.

== Music video ==
The music video was released on March 6. It was filmed in Long Beach, California and was directed by Chris Sims.

The video opens with a man leaving an industrial area with and after packing a box of items. As he enters his car we find out about an eviction notice and unpaid bills along with a cut to his wife and child. Various shots of the band playing (along with a solitary side shot of Jacoby) in front of the same industrial area the man was seen leaving are edited into the story. As he enters his car the image turns black and white and shows him being chased by another man with cuts and bruises, which turns out to be him. The injured man eventually calls out to the other during the "I'm never gonna fade away" section of the song and the running man stops, turns, faces him and they collide as the same man now back in his car drives past many homes with "For Lease" signs on them. He smiles however as his child and wife run towards him upon returning home.

=== Awards ===
"Lifeline" was nominated for Fuse TV's Best Video of 2009 contest, beating Metallica's "All Nightmare Long", Daughtry's "No Surprise", Shinedown's "Sound of Madness", and Paramore's "Ignorance", before finishing second to Britney Spears for her song "Circus" in the final round. VH1 voted it the Top Rock Song of the Year, and also finished first in Rolling Stone's top 10 Alternative Songs of 2009.

== Track listing ==
No.	Title	Length
1.	"Lifeline"	4:08
2.	"Getting Away with Murder" (Live in Chicago)	4:03

7" single

No.	Title	Length
1.	"Lifeline" (radio remix)	3:59
2.	"Lifeline" (acoustic version)	3:57

== Sound ==
"Lifeline" begins in the key of D major, often switching between this and G minor. It has often been related to AC/DC's type of quick fret style music.

Lead singer Jacoby Shaddix said in an interview relating to "Lifeline"'s changing of their genre from their old style, "We ain't rapping anymore, all I wanted to do when I was a child was rock it out, which we are starting to do now."

== Song meaning ==
Jacoby Shaddix told the story of the song in a video interview: "We were packing up our equipment. I was upstairs packing up my room and I heard this riff ringing up the hallway and it was like Damn! That's sick. So we went down there and jammed it out in about an hour, got the beef to the song, tweaked it in a bunch of different ways. It's a very uplifting song. Lyrically it's about progressing as a human being, as a spiritual being in this crazy shit. It sounds clichéd as this band is my lifeline to humanity, its what connects me to the flow of life."

Continuing, he also stated this about his motives for "Lifeline": "We know right now America is crazy times. People are hurting. Sacramento, near where we are from, is the leading region for home foreclosures in America, so they are setting up tent cities and shit is going down. We want to send love to people going through hardships."

Jacoby also commented in an interview about "Lifeline", saying, once again, the meaning was "of the tough economic times America is facing".

== Reception ==
"Lifeline" received mixed reviews by critics. Chris Fallon of AbsolutePunk.net said about the single: Too many times the band takes one step forward and two steps back, at least showing some minimal signs of life in a dying genre built on repetition. Shaddix has a solid voice for this sound, and Horton seems to be discovering a new use for his distortion pedal, there are just far too many cliches in the ocean Papa Roach is trying to swim across, and the band can't seem to cope with their identity.

Stephen Thomas Erlewine of Allmusic said that the song has "a dire determination to its purported good times". "Lifeline" is Papa Roach's first song to top the Billboard Hot Mainstream Rock Tracks chart and lasted for six weeks. Unlike "Last Resort", "Lifeline" did not reach number one on Hot Modern Rock Tracks, but instead, reached number three and never reached any higher rank. The song is available as a downloadable song for the Rock Band video games and later appeared as a playable track in Band Hero. It is also on the iPhone and iPod Touch game Tap Tap Revenge 2. Therefore, increasing sales of "Lifeline". As of May 21, 2009, "Lifeline" has sold over 135,000 digital copies and was certified Gold by the RIAA on December 6, 2024.

== Charts ==
=== Weekly charts ===
Weekly chart performance for "Lifeline"
Chart (2009)	Peak position
Canada Hot 100 (Billboard)	95
Canada Rock (Billboard)	7
Czech Republic Rock (IFPI)	4
UK Physical Singles (Official Charts)	50
US Billboard Hot 100	81
US Adult Pop Airplay (Billboard)	33
US Hot Rock & Alternative Songs (Billboard)	5

=== Year-end charts ===
Year-end chart performance for "Lifeline"
Chart (2009)	Position
US Hot Rock Songs (Billboard)	9

== Certifications ==
Certifications for "Lifeline"
Region	Certification	Certified units/sales
United States (RIAA)	Gold	500,000^{‡}
^{‡} Sales+streaming figures based on certification alone.
