= I Almost Told You That I Loved You =

2009 single by Papa Roach

Single by Papa Roach

from the album Metamorphosis
- Released: June 1, 2009
- Recorded: February 2008–May 2008 at the Paramour Mansion in Hollywood, California
- Genre: Hard rock
- Length: 3:12
- Label: DGC; Interscope
- Songwriters: Jacoby Shaddix; Tobin Esperance; James Michael
- Producers: Jay Baumgardner; James Michael

Papa Roach singles chronology
"Lifeline" (2009)	"I Almost Told You That I Loved You" (2009)	"Burn" (2010)

Music video
- "I Almost Told You That I Loved You" on YouTube

"I Almost Told You That I Loved You" is the third single from Californian rock band Papa Roach's fifth album, Metamorphosis, and twelfth released single in total.

== Music video ==
The video is set in a brothel filled with strippers with the band playing in the middle of it. The scenes flick off in many places to acts of sexual intercourse. There are three versions of the video: the one for public viewing (without Jacoby Shaddix being whipped by his wife), the censored and uncensored version. In the end of the video a girl kisses another girl trying to escape and drops a ring that on the inside says I Love You.

== Track listing ==
No.	Title	Length
1.	"I Almost Told You That I Loved You" (clean version)	3:14
2.	"I Almost Told You That I Loved You" (album version)	3:14

== Chart performance ==
Chart (2009)	Peak position
Czech Republic Rock (IFPI)	17
U.S. Billboard Modern Rock Tracks	35
U.S. Billboard Mainstream Rock Tracks	20
U.S. Billboard Rock Songs	32
