= Between Angels and Insects =

2001 single by Papa Roach

Single by Papa Roach

from the album Infest
- Released: January 30, 2001
- Genre: Nu metal; rap metal
- Length: 3:54
- Label: DreamWorks
- Songwriters: Jacoby Shaddix; Tobin Esperance
- Producer: Jay Baumgardner

Papa Roach singles chronology
"Broken Home" (2000)	"Between Angels and Insects" (2001)	"Dead Cell" (2001)

Music video
- "Between Angels and Insects" on YouTube

"Between Angels and Insects" is a song by American rock band Papa Roach. It appears on their second studio album, Infest, and was released as the album's third single on January 30, 2001. The song charted in multiple countries, most notably reaching the top 20 of the UK all-format charts.

== Track listing ==
CD maxi
No.	Title	Length
1.	"Between Angels and Insects" (album version)	3:56
2.	"Blood Brothers" (Live – Universal Buzz radio version)	3:32
3.	"Binge" (Live – Universal Buzz radio version)	3:56
4.	"Between Angels and Insects" (video)

European CD single
No.	Title	Length
1.	"Between Angels and Insects" (radio edit)	3:58
2.	"Last Resort" (live)	3:33
3.	"Binge" (live)	3:50
4.	"Between Angels and Insects" (enhanced video)

Australian CD single
No.	Title	Length
1.	"Between Angels and Insects"
2.	"Last Resort"
3.	"Dead Cell" (live)
4.	"Legacy" (non-album track)
5.	"Broken Home" (enhanced video)
6.	"Last Resort" (enhanced video)

Limited edition CD single
No.	Title	Length
1.	"Between Angels and Insects" (album version)	3:57
2.	"Tightrope" (Live at the Astoria, London in January 2001)	5:14
3.	"Barbed Wire" (Live at the Astoria, London in January 2001)	3:46

== Charts ==
Chart (2001)	Peak position
Australia (ARIA) with "Last Resort"	86
European Hot 100 Singles (Billboard)	63
Germany (Media Control Charts)	94
Ireland (IRMA)	20
Scottish Singles Sales (Official Charts)	14
UK Singles (Official Charts Company)	17
UK Rock & Metal (Official Charts Company)	2
US Alternative Airplay (Billboard)	16
US Mainstream Rock (Billboard)	27

== Certifications ==
Region	Certification	Certified units/sales
United Kingdom (BPI)	Silver	200,000^{‡}
^{‡} Sales+streaming figures based on certification alone.

== Release history ==
Region	Date	Format(s)	Label(s)	Ref.
United States	January 30, 2001	Mainstream rock; active rock; alternative radio	DreamWorks	
United Kingdom	April 23, 2001	CD; cassette	DreamWorks	
Europe	May 22, 2001	Maxi-CD	DreamWorks	
