= She Loves Me Not (song) =

Single by Papa Roach

from the album Lovehatetragedy
- Released: June 4, 2002
- Recorded: 1999–2002
- Genre: Nu metal; rap rock
- Length: 3:29
- Label: DreamWorks
- Songwriters: Jacoby Shaddix; Tobin Esperance
- Producer: Brendan O'Brien

Papa Roach singles chronology
"Dead Cell" (2001)	"She Loves Me Not" (2002)	"Time and Time Again" (2002)

Music video
- "She Loves Me Not" on YouTube

"She Loves Me Not" is the first single from rock band Papa Roach's third studio album, Lovehatetragedy, and fourth released single in total. Originally written as part of a five-track promo and demo CD funded by Warner Bros. Records in 1999, "She Loves Me Not" was re-recorded and improved for its new release in 2002. It was left off their first album, Infest (2000), because the band thought the song was too rock-oriented. The song appeared in the soundtrack for the game NHL 2003.

== Music video ==
The video for "She Loves Me Not" shows the band playing in a dilapidated theme park which people are using as a social gathering. The content is mostly performance based with cuts to people in the park who are vandalizing it, fighting, etc. It was directed by David Meyers.

At three points in the video, a person appears out of nowhere in front of the camera for a single frame, similar to methods used in subliminal messaging.

== Track listing ==
UK CD single
No.	Title	Length
1.	"She Loves Me Not" (dirty version)	3:33
2.	"Naked in Front of the Computer" (Faith No More cover)	2:13
3.	"Blood Brothers" (live at the Crest Theatre, Sacramento, January 2000)	3:09

Limited edition maxi CD
No.	Title	Length
1.	"She Loves Me Not"	3:31
2.	"Life Is a Bullet" (live BBC 1 version)	4:11
3.	"Lovehatetragedy" (live BBC 1 version)	3:12

European CD single
No.	Title	Length
1.	"She Loves Me Not" (album version)	3:30
2.	"Naked in Front of the Computer"	2:12
3.	"Tightrope" (rock version)	3:34
4.	"Blood Brothers" (live at the Crest Theatre, Sacramento, January 2000)	3:09

Japanese promo CD
No.	Title	Length
1.	"She Loves Me Not" (radio version)
2.	"M-80"
3.	"Time and Time Again"

== Charts ==
Chart performance for "She Loves Me Not"
Chart (2002)	Peak position
Australia (ARIA)	72
Europe (Eurochart Hot 100)	41
Finland (Suomen virallinen lista)	20
Germany (GfK)	47
Ireland (IRMA)	23
Netherlands (Dutch Top 40)	16
Netherlands (Single Top 100)	62
Scottish Singles Sales (Official Charts)	15
Switzerland (Schweizer Hitparade)	72
UK Singles (Official Charts)	14
UK Rock & Metal (Official Charts)	3
US Billboard Hot 100	76
US Alternative Airplay (Billboard)	5
US Mainstream Rock (Billboard)	3
