= Jacoby Shaddix =

American musician (born 1976)

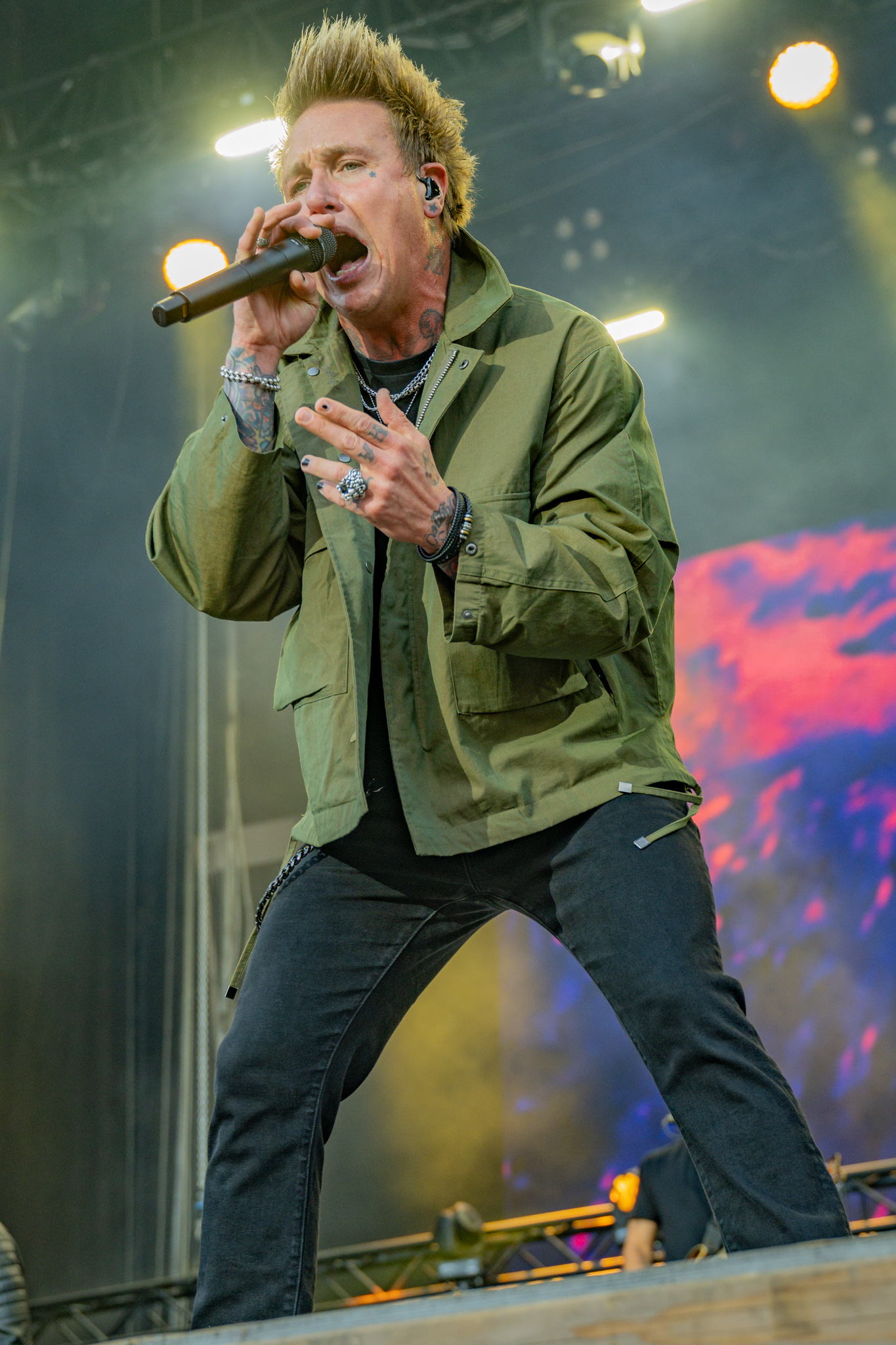
- Shaddix performing with Papa Roach in 2023

Background information
- Also known as: Coby Dick; Jonny Vodka; John Doe; Dakota Gold; Jacobo Insonico
- Born: Jacoby Dakota Shaddix; July 28, 1976 (age 50); Mariposa, California, U.S.
- Genres: Alternative rock; nu metal; rap metal; alternative metal; hard rock
- Occupations: Singer; rapper; songwriter; television presenter
- Instruments: Vocals; keyboards; percussion
- Years active: 1993–present
- Member of: Papa Roach
- Formerly of: Fight the Sky
- Website: paparoach.com

Jacoby Dakota Shaddix (born July 28, 1976) is an American singer, rapper, songwriter, and television presenter. He is best known as a founding member and the continuous lead singer of the California-based rock band Papa Roach since the band's formation in 1993.

Shaddix served as the host of the MTV show Scarred for the entirety of the show's run, presenting both seasons and all 20 episodes of the show, which spanned from April 10 to September 18, 2007. Shaddix would ultimately leave the show due to touring demands with Papa Roach. The name of the show was based on the Papa Roach song "Scars".

Shaddix is one of the co-owners of a rock-inspired clothing line with designer Jeff Henry called "Lovers Are Lunatics", with the focus being described as "to create a brand that represents the rock community and showcases their unique creative vision".

== Music career ==
=== Papa Roach (1993–present) ===
Shaddix is the founding member of Papa Roach. He formed the band with former drummer Dave Buckner, bassist Will James, and guitarist Ben Luther, in 1993. Luther was replaced by current guitarist Jerry Horton, and by 1996 Tobin Esperance had replaced Will James following his departure. In 2007, Dave Buckner's role was filled by Tony Palermo, leaving Jacoby as the only original member in the band. The band's name, Papa Roach, was the result of mixing up the nickname of Jacoby's maternal grandfather —Herbert Fischer "Papa"— and "Roach" coming from his paternal grandfather, John "Grandpa" Roatch. Both grandparents were musicians.

Before releasing their major-label debut album, Infest, Papa Roach recorded and published an EP in 1994 entitled Potatoes For Christmas. In 1997, their first full-length album, entitled Old Friends from Young Years, was released.

When Papa Roach started, Shaddix went by the stage name "Coby Dick", inspired by the band's tour van which was named Moby Dick. After the band rose in popularity and he read articles referring to himself as Dick (e.g. "...Dick said"), Shaddix regretted the choice and decided to use his birth name beginning with the band's next album Lovehatetragedy.

Shaddix stopped using rapping as a whole in their 2004 album Getting Away with Murder. In an interview in 2004, Shaddix said that he became disenchanted with hip-hop and what it represented in the media and stated that "I just want to be a rocker"; in 2009, he stated that it was safe to assume he would not be rapping again. However, in 2012, Shaddix started rapping again in the album The Connection. There were some tracks on their 2017 album Crooked Teeth that featured rapping. In 2021, Shaddix looked back on his and Papa Roach's association with the nu metal genre, saying, "I love being one of the forefathers of nu metal, that’s dope, but we’ve been able to outlive it and celebrate it at the same time."

On December 13, 2019, Shaddix provided new vocals for a remix of The Hu's "Wolf Totem".

=== Fight the Sky (2002–2004) ===
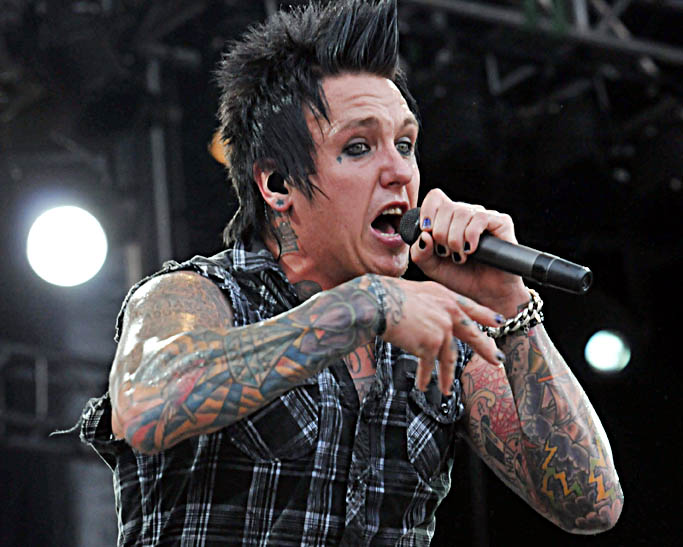
Shaddix in 2010

Shaddix performed as the lead singer of a post-hardcore band called Fight the Sky from 2002 to 2004 under the name 'John Doe'. The band was intended as a side project of Shaddix where he could display the heavier side of his vocals. The band's line-up consisted of Shaddix as the lead singer, Wade Khail as the lead guitarist and backing vocalist, Ali Abrishami as the bass guitarist and backing vocalist, and Jay Ingram on the drums and percussion. The band had signed a record deal to Papa Roach's self-owned label El Tonal Records and entered Velvet Tone Studios in Sacramento, California, to record their debut album Seven Deadly Songs between January and February 2004. No public updates have been made regarding either the release date of the album or the future of Fight the Sky.

== Personal life ==
Shaddix currently resides in Sacramento with his wife Kelly, who he married in 1997. The couple has three sons.

Shaddix has stated that in the first year of his life, he and his family were homeless. Shaddix has had problems with alcohol and drug abuse, but has been sober since 2012. Shaddix revealed he was suicidal before getting clean in 2012. He admitted to a partial relapse during the COVID-19 pandemic, as the stress of the pandemic caused him to smoke marijuana. However, after receiving encouragement from friends, he stopped smoking and has been clean since.

Shaddix is a devoted Christian and has been known to sing Christian hymns and songs at public events.

== Filmography ==
- Total Request Live (2000)
- Top of the Pops (2001)
- MTV Bash: Carson Daly (2003)
- Player$ (2003)
- Interaktiv (2004)
- Sarah Kuttner – Die Show (2004)
- The Late Late Show with Craig Kilborn (2004)
- Papa Roach: Live & Murderous in Chicago (2005)
- Scarred (2007)
- The Invited (2010)
- Metal Evolution (2012)
- At Hell's Door: Behind the Scenes at Hellfest (2013)
- Mulatschag (2013)
- Papa Roach: Live from Nokia (2013)
- The Retaliators (2022)

== Discography ==
=== Papa Roach ===
- Old Friends from Young Years (1997)
- Infest (2000)
- Lovehatetragedy (2002)
- Getting Away with Murder (2004)
- The Paramour Sessions (2006)
- Metamorphosis (2009)
- Time for Annihilation (2010)
- The Connection (2012)
- F.E.A.R. (2015)
- Crooked Teeth (2017)
- Who Do You Trust? (2019)
- Ego Trip (2022)

=== Fight the Sky ===
- Seven Deadly Songs (never released; recorded in 2004)

=== Other appearances ===
Year	Song	Artist	Album
2003	"Anxiety"	Black Eyed Peas	Elephunk
2003	"Conquer the World"	Die Trying	Die Trying
2003	"Come Apart"	Reach 454	Reach 454
2005	"Forever in Our Hearts" (featuring Mýa, Nate Dogg, Sonny Sandoval, Jacoby Shaddix, Fefe Dobson, Pete Loeffler, Ben Jelen and Ben Moody)	Brian McKnight	Single
2006	"Phoenix and the Fall"	The Fight of Your Life	The Phoenix EP
2007	"Americans"	X Clan	Return from Mecca
2009	"Outta Control" (featuring Jacoby Shaddix and Travis Barker)	Mams Taylor	Unreleased
2010	"Smoke on the Water"	Carlos Santana	Guitar Heaven: The Greatest Guitar Classics of All Time
2011	"Warning"	Skindred	Union Black
2011	"Not the End of the World"	Shahnaz	Single
2013	"Promises"	Lonely Kings	American Heartache
2014	"The Future"	Ronnie Radke	Watch Me mixtape
2014	"Out of Control"	Glamour of the Kill	After Hours
2015	"Runaway"	Coldrain	Vena
2016	"This Light I Hold"	Memphis May Fire	This Light I Hold
2017	"Don't Stop"	Nothing More	"Don't Stop" (single version)
2018	"The Reckoning"	Within Temptation	Resist
2019	"Sworn Apart"	Mark Morton	Anesthetic
2019	"Wolf Totem" (featuring Jacoby Shaddix)	The Hu	Non-album single
2020	"Heart of a Champion" (featuring Papa Roach and Ice Nine Kills)	Hollywood Undead	New Empire, Vol. 2
2021	"Untouchable"	Atreyu	Baptize
2021	"Hip to Be Scared"	Ice Nine Kills	The Silver Scream 2: Welcome to Horrorwood
2021	"White Room" (featuring Jacoby Shaddix)	Apocalyptica	Non-album single
2026	"Fall Away" (featuring Jacoby Shaddix)	Story of the Year	A.R.S.O.N.
