= Emery discography =

Discography of the American rock band Emery

- Studio albums: 10
- Extended plays: 10
- Music videos: 20
- Other appearances: 5

The discography of Emery, an American post-hardcore band, consists of ten studio albums, four extended plays and one box set. The band's first extended play, The Columbus EEP Thee, was released in 2002 and failed to rank on the national chart. Emery released their second extended play, The Weak's End EP, in 2004 to help them become noticed by record labels.

After signing a contract with Tooth & Nail, the band released its debut album The Weak's End in the United States in January 2004. In the subsequent year, the band released its second album, The Question. It became their most successful album in the US, reaching No. 45. To promote the album they released the extended play The Question Pre-Sale Exclusive. Emery released their third studio album, I'm Only a Man, in 2007. The album received a four-and-a-half-star review from AllMusic, and charted on the Billboard 200 at No. 78.

Emery's fourth extended play, While Broken Hearts Prevail, was released in 2008 and reached No. 104 in the United States. In 2009, the band released its fourth album, ...In Shallow Seas We Sail; it peaked at No. 50. The band released a box set, Are You Listening?, in 2010. Emery's fifth studio album, We Do What We Want, was released in 2011 and reached No. 76 in the United States. An untitled acoustic album is scheduled for release in 2011.

The bands sixth studio album, You Were Never Alone, was released in 2015.

The year 2018 saw the release of the bands seventh studio album entitled Eve.

In 2021, the band almost entirely remade their 2007 release. Rerecording many guitar and vocal tracks, I’m Only a Man (Emery’s Version) was a full album including every song on the original.

Emery’s eighth studio album was released in 2022 called Rub Some Dirt On It.

2024 saw a release of Sparrow Sleeps partnering with Emery to reimagine many of the band’s hits. The album entitled The Night’s End: Lullaby covers of Emery song features each track instrumental only and the music is rewritten in soft piano, chimes, and orchaestration for baby sleep night-night time.

In May 2026, the band announced a Fall album release entitled Styrofoam

== Albums ==
=== Studio albums ===
Year	Album details	Peak chart positions				
Year	Album details	US	US Christ	US Rock	US Alt	US Digital
2004	The Weak's End: Released: January 15, 2004; Re-released: January 27, 2004; Label: Tooth & Nail; Format: CD, CS, LP, DL	—	39	—	—	—
2005	The Question: Released: August 2, 2005; Label: Tooth & Nail; Format: CD, LP, DL	45	2	—	—	—
2007	I'm Only a Man: Released: October 2, 2007; Label: Tooth & Nail; Format: CD, LP, DL	78	4	21	18	—
2009	...In Shallow Seas We Sail: Released: June 2, 2009; Label: Tooth & Nail; Format: CD, LP, DL	50	1	20	16	50
2011	We Do What We Want: Released: March 29, 2011; Label: Tooth & Nail, Solid State; Format: CD, LP, DL	76	2	22	15	—
2015	You Were Never Alone: Released: May 19, 2015; Label: Bad Christian Music; Format: CD, LP, DL	69	1	10	8	—
2018	Eve: Released: November 9, 2018; Label: Bad Christian Music; Format: CD, LP, DL	137	—	24	12	—
2020	White Line Fever: Releases June 5, 2020; Label: Bad Christian Music; Format: CD, LP, DL	—	—	—	—	—
2022	Rub Some Dirt on It: Released: June 24, 2022; Label: Tooth & Nail; Format: CD, LP, DL	—	—	—	—	—
2026	Styrofoam: Released: August 7, 2026; Label: Self-released; Format: CD, LP, DL	—	—	—	—	—
"—" denotes releases that did not chart.

=== Extended plays ===
Year	Album details	Peak chart positions	
Year	Album details	US	US Christ
2002	The Columbus EEP Thee: Released: October 13, 2002; Label: Independent; Format: CD	—	—
2005	The Question Pre-sale Exclusive: Released: August 2, 2005; Label: Tooth & Nail (#90648); Format: CD, LP, DL	—	—
2008	While Broken Hearts Prevail: Released: October 28, 2008; Label: Tooth & Nail (#90648); Format: CD, LP, DL	104	8
2015	We Wish You Emery Christmas: Released: December 14, 2015; Label: BadChristian Music; Format: DL	—	—
2016	Live in Houston: Released: April 28, 2016; Label: BadChristian Music; Format: CD	—	—
2019	Dead End: Released: May 7, 2019; Label: Self-released; Format: DL	—	—
2019	Now What?: Released: 2019; Label: Self-released; Format: LP, DL	—	—
2019	15 Year Anniversary Split (with Hawthorne Heights): Released: 2019; Label: Self-released; Format: CDr, EP, Limited Edition	—	—
2019	Cocoa & Christmas: Released: 2019; Label: Self-released; Format: DL	—	—
2020	Palmetto: Released: February 24, 2020; Label: Self-released; Format: DL	—	—
"—" denotes releases that did not chart.

=== Compilations ===
Year	Album details
2010	Are You Listening?: Released: April 6, 2010; Label: Tooth & Nail (#00000); Format: 3×CD box set
2011	Ten Years: Released: October 14, 2011; Label: Tooth & Nail (#85118); Format: CD, DL

== Music videos ==
Year	Song	Album	Director(s)
2005	"Walls"	The Weak's End	Kevin Leonard
2005	"Disguising Mistakes With Goodbyes"	The Weak's End	Djay Brawner
2006	"Studying Politics"	The Question	Major Lightner
2007	"The Party Song"	I'm Only a Man	Major Lightner
2009	"Butcher's Mouth"	...In Shallow Seas We Sail	Steven Schultz
2011	"The Cheval Glass"	We Do What We Want	Van Blumreich
2011	"Scissors"	We Do What We Want	Van Blumreich
2015	"The Less You Say"	You Were Never Alone	James Wightman
2015	"The Beginning"	You Were Never Alone	James Wightman
2015	"Hard Times"	You Were Never Alone	James Wightman
2015	"Taken For A Bath"	You Were Never Alone	James Wightman
2015	"Go Wrong Young Man"	You Were Never Alone	James Wightman
2015	"What's Stopping You"	You Were Never Alone	James Wightman
2018	"Is This The Real Life"	Eve	James Wightman
2018	"People Always Ask Me if We're Gonna Cuss in an Emery Song"	Eve	James Wightman
2018	"Shame"	Eve	James Wightman
2018	"Young Boys Dream"	Eve	James Wightman
2018	"Name Your God"	Eve	James Wightman
2020	"Civil Wars"	White Line Fever	James Wightman
2020	"Make Yourself Sick"	White Line Fever	

== Other appearances ==
Year	Title	Album
2005	"(Ho Ho Hey) A Way for Santa's Sleigh"	Happy Christmas Vol. 4
2005	"Holding Out for a Hero" (Bonnie Tyler cover)	Punk Goes 80's
2005	"The Last Christmas"	Taste of Christmas
2006	"All I Want" (Toad The Wet Sprocket cover)	Punk Goes 90's
2010	"Jesus Gave Us Christmas"	Happy Christmas Vol. 5
2016	"To the Deep"	Hearts Bleed Passion Vol. 6 - Part 2
