= Fever 333 discography =

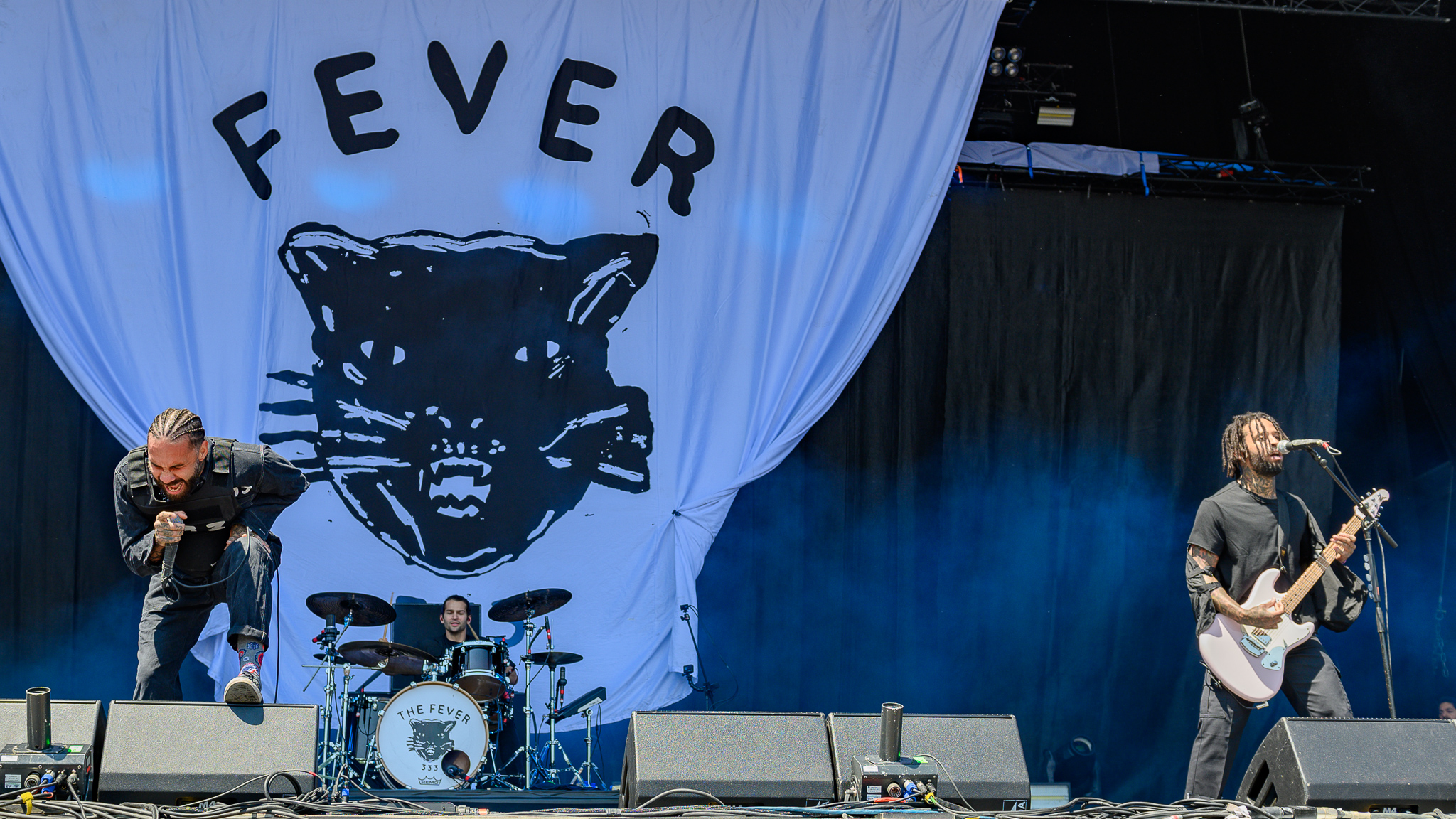
- Studio albums: 2
- EPs: 2
- Singles: 17
- Music videos: 17

The American rock band Fever 333 has released two studio albums, two extended plays and 10 singles.

== Studio albums ==
List of studio albums
Title	Details	Peak Chart Positions				
Title	Details	AUS	BEL (Fla.)	GER	SCO	SWI
Strength in Numb333rs	Released: January 18, 2019; Label: Roadrunner, 333 Wreckords Crew; Format: CD, Vinyl, digital download, streaming, LP record	38	156	73	90	75
Darker White	Released: October 4, 2024; Label: Century Media, 333 Wreckords Crew; Format: CD, Vinyl, digital download, streaming, LP record	—	—	—	—	—

== Extended plays ==
List of extended plays
Title	Details
Made an America	Released: March 23, 2018; Label: Roadrunner, 333 Wreckords Crew; Format: LP, CD, digital download
Wrong Generation	Released: October 23, 2020; Label: Roadrunner, 333 Wreckords Crew; Format: CD, digital download

== Singles ==
=== As lead artist ===
Title	Year	Peak chart positions			Album
Title	Year	US Main. Rock	US Hard Rock	US Rock	Album
"Walking in My Shoes"	2018	8	—	—	Made an America
"Trigger"	2018	—	—	—	Non-album single
"Made an America"	2018	21	—	—	Made an America
"Burn It"	2018	—	—	—	Strength in Numb333rs
"One of Us"	2019	23	—	—	Strength in Numb333rs
"Kingdom"	2019	—	—	—	Non-album singles
"Vandals"	2019	—	—	—	Non-album singles
"Presence Is Strength"	2020	—	—	—	Non-album singles
"Supremacy"	2020	—	—	—	Wrong Generation
"Bite Back"	2020	—	—	—	Wrong Generation
"$wing"	2023	40	—	—	Darker White
"Ready Rock"	2024	—	—	—	Non-album single
"New West Order"	2024	—	—	—	Darker White
"Higher Power"	2024	—	—	—	Darker White
"Desert Rap"	2024	—	—	—	Darker White
"Murderer"	2024	—	—	—	Darker White
"Hellfire"	2024	—	7	47	Arcane League of Legends: Season 2

=== As featured artist ===
Title	Year	Album
"Scary Mask" (Poppy featuring Fever 333)	2019	Choke
"Clique" (Yonaka featuring Fever 333)	2021	Seize the Power
"Swerve" (Papa Roach featuring Fever 333 and Sueco)	2021	Ego Trip
"Head In The Clouds" (Unprocessed featuring Fever 333)	2025	Angel

== Music videos ==
Title	Year	Director	Ref.
"We're Coming In"	2017	Unknown	
"Walking in My Shoes"	2017	Sky Stone	
"Trigger"	2018	Jason Goldwatch	
"Made an America"	2018	Jason Aalon Alexander Butler	
"Made an America" (feat. Travis Barker and Vic Mensa)	2018	Brandon Dermer	
"Burn It"	2018	Djay Brawner	
"One of Us"	2019	Djay Brawner	
"Animal"	2019	Unknown	
"Last Time"	2021	Djay Brawner	
"Wrong Generation" (ft. Travis Barker)	2021	Djay Brawner	
"$wing"	2023	Djay Brawner	
"New West Order"	2024	Djay Brawner	
"Higher Power"	2024	Djay Brawner	
"No Hostages"	2024	Djay Brawner	
"Desert Rap"	2024	Djay Brawner	
"Murderer"	2024	Djay Brawner	
"Pin Drop"	2024	Djay Brawner	
