= Djay Brawner =

American music video, film, and television director

- Born: June 21, 1981 (age 45); Menlo Park, California, U.S.
- Education: Chapman University
- Occupations: Film, music video, television director

Djay Brawner (born June 21, 1981) is an American director of music videos, film, and television.

== Career ==
In 2000, after taking film classes at De Anza College, he moved Orange, California to begin his education at Chapman University's film school. While studying there, he produced and directed a number of films and soon after went on to become a director Generator, a music video production company started by Derek Dale. During that time he filmed a number of upcoming bands, many of which have been featured on MTV, MTV2, and Fuse. His first commissioned music video was for Emery in 2004.

DJay Brawner has directed videos for Danny Ocean, 3Oh!3, Melanie Martinez, Halestorm, Panic! At The Disco, Beartooth, William Beckett. among others.

From 2005 to 2006, Brawner created, directed, and produced 26 episodes of a magazine style television show called Noise Link. He later went on to found Anthem Films, a commercial and music video production company.

== Films ==
- 72 Hours: A Love Story (2011)
- The Beginners Guide to Snuff (2016) as producer
- Driving While Black (2016) as producer
- It's Still Nothing Personal by All Time Low (2019)
- Lawtown (2019) as executive producer

== Television ==
- Sunny Family Cult (2016) as executive producer & director

== Music videos as director ==
- "Dancing Machine" by Wiggum (2003)
- "Radio Life" by Wiggum (2004)
- "Disguising Mistakes With Goodbyes" by Emery (2004)
- "Loadinplayloadout" by My New Life (2004)
- "Faith" by Ginger Sling (2004)
- "Mouth" by UpSyndrome (2004)
- "Black Cat" by Mayday Parade (2007)
- "Connect/Disconnect" by The Action Design (2008)
- "Atlantic City" by Mike Herrera's Tumbledown (2008)
- "Ballad Of A Factory Man" by Mike Herrera's Tumbledown (2008)
- "21st Century Fight Song" by Jackson United (2008)
- "Farewell" by Hope Departed (2008)
- "Enough Is Enough" by Stick To Your Guns (2008)
- "One Night Stand" by Big City Kids (2008)
- "Digging Up The Dead" by Eudora (2009)
- "Money Don't Make A Difference" by Arielle Paige (2010)
- "Synthetic Hearts" by Everyday Tragedy (2010)
- "Still I Rise" by Sam Adams featuring G Curtis (2010)
- "Give Me Something" by Scars On 45 (2011)
- "Rope" by Foo Fighters (2011)
- "Stereo Hearts" by Gym Class Heroes (2011)
- "Ass Back Home" by Gym Class Heroes (2011)
- "Run" by Flo Rida (2012)
- "Something Deadly" by Fake Figures (2012)
- "As We Drift" by Fake Figures (2012)
- "Haunted Heart" by Little Hurricane (2012)
- "Yours Forever" by The Seeking (2012)
- "Fate" by Our Last Night (2012)
- "Hands and Faces" by The Used (2013)
- "Give Myself" by Zoo Brazil (2013)
- "Heart's A Legend" by Zoo Brazil (2013)
- "The Message" by Zoo Brazil (2013)
- "Safe" by DJ Muggs (2013)
- "We Don't Sleep Tonight" by Young Empires (2013)
- "Shouting At The Rain" by The Dear Hunter (2013)
- "Take Me Home" by Cash Cash (2013)
- "Girls / Girls / Boys" by Panic! at the Disco (2013)
- "Go Be the Voice" by Beartooth (2013)
- "Flicker Fade" by Taking Back Sunday (2014)
- "All of the Stars" by Ed Sheeran (2014)
- "Crazy For You" by Scars On 45 (2014)
- "Call" by Francesco Yates (2014)
- "Staring At The Sun" by Anastacia (2014)
- "Through The Night" by Cedric Gervais (2014)
- "Conformist" by XTRMST (2014)
- "The Heartbeat the Soul" by Dark Waves (2014)
- "Better Homes and Gardens" by Taking Back Sunday (2015)
- "Amen" by Halestorm (2015)
- "I Am the Fire" by Halestorm (2015)
- "Apocalyptic" by Halestorm (2015)
- "Mayhem" by Halestorm (2015)
- "Pity Party" by Melanie Martinez (2015)
- "Diamonds In The Dark" by Dark Waves (2014)
- "Heist" by Lindsey Stirling (2015)
- "You Got Spirit, Kid" by Coheed and Cambria (2015)
- "Freak Your Mind" by 3oh!3 (2016)
- "Hear Me Now" by 3oh!3 (2016)
- "Call Come Running" by Taking Back Sunday (2016)
- "You Can't Look Back" by Taking Back Sunday (2016)
- "War" by Sum 41 (2016)
- "Jump" by Lupe Fiasco (2017)
- "Little One" by Highly Suspect (2017)
- "Me Rehúso" / "Baby I Won't" by Danny Ocean (2017)
- "Imagine If" by Gnash (2018)
- "The Broken Hearts Club" by Gnash (2018)
- "Burn It" by Fever 333 (2019)
- "16" by Highly Suspect (2019)
- "One of Us" by Fever 333 (2019)
- "CMFT Can't Be Stopped" by Corey Taylor (2020)
- "Black Eyes Blue" by Corey Taylor (2020)
- "Samantha's Gone" by Corey Taylor (2021)
- "The Last Time" by Fever 333 (2020)
- "Wrong Generation" by Fever 333 featuringTravis Barker (2020)
- "Sledge" by Dance With The Dead (2021)
- "Scavangers" by Thrice (2021)
- "Loved Me Back To Life" by Travie McCoy (2021)
- "Autoboto" by Lupe Fiasco (2022)
- "Bad At Love" by Smith & Myers (2022)
- "Lowest in Me" by Staind
- "Tell Me I'm Alive" by All Time Low (2023)
- "Calm Down" by All Time Low (2023)
- "S'old" by Taking Back Sunday (2023)
