= The Question (Emery album) =

Album by Emery

Studio album by Emery
- Released: August 2, 2005
- Recorded: 2005
- Genre: Post-hardcore, progressive rock
- Length: 41:00
- Label: Tooth & Nail
- Producer: Brandon Ebel, Aaron Sprinkle

Emery chronology
The Weak's End (2004)	The Question (2005)	I'm Only a Man (2007)

Singles from The Question
- 1. "Studying Politics" Released: February 21, 2006

Professional ratings
Review scores
Source	Rating
Allmusic	3.5/5 stars
Jesus Freak Hideout	4.5/5 stars

The Question is the second album released by Emery. The question the title speaks of involves what is printed on the back of the CD jewel case, "Where were you when I was..." The track titles complete this question (e.g. "Where were you when I was in a lose, lose situation?" or "Where were you when I was studying politics?" or "Where were you when I was so cold I could see my breath?").

On November 21, 2006, Emery re-released The Question, including five acoustic versions of previously recorded songs and two new demo tracks and a DVD. The DVD includes "Emery - A Film", "Live Songs", and "Bonus Footage".

== Track listing ==
All tracks are written by Emery.

Where were you when I was...
No.	Title	Length
1.	"So Cold I Could See My Breath"	3:31
2.	"Playing with Fire"	3:51
3.	"Returning the Smile You Have Had from the Start"	3:04
4.	"Studying Politics"	3:31
5.	"Left with Alibis and Lying Eyes"	3:22
6.	"Listening to Freddie Mercury"	2:42
7.	"The Weakest"	4:04
8.	"Miss Behavin'"	3:17
9.	"In Between 4th and 2nd Street"	0:32
10.	"The Terrible Secret"	3:28
11.	"In a Lose, Lose Situation"	3:56
12.	"In a Win, Win Situation"	5:42
Total length:		41:00

== Deluxe edition ==
The Question Deluxe Edition

Studio album by Emery
- Released: November 21, 2006
- Recorded: Compound Recording, Seattle
- Genre: Post-hardcore
- Length: 69:47
- Label: Tooth & Nail
- Producer: Aaron Sprinkle and Matt Carter

Emery chronology
The Question (2005)	The Question Deluxe Edition (2006)

The Question Deluxe Edition was released in 2006, along with a DVD, five acoustic versions of previously recorded songs, and two new demo tracks. The question the title speaks of is the first thing you will read when you open the booklet inside the case. The question is, "Where were you when I was..." and the track titles complete this question (This does not include the acoustic or demo tracks). The DVD includes "Emery - A Film.", "Live Songs", and "Bonus Footage".

Also, if you put the DVD in a computer and select either the bonus footage section or the live song section and find two extra videos, and four or five other songs. Just scroll the mouse over both pages and try to find the black emery logo icon that pops up. DVD Features:

- Emery - A Film
- Live Songs -
- 1. Intro
- 2. Returning the Smile You Have Had from the Start
- 3. So Cold I Could See My Breath
- 4. The Ponytail Parades
- 5. Studying Politics
- 6. Walls
- 7. Walls - Early Rendition
- Bonus Footage - Blowouts - A School Bus - Picking A Name

=== Track listing ===
Where were you when I was...

1. "So Cold I Could See My Breath" – 3:31
2. "Playing with Fire" – 3:51
3. "Returning the Smile You Have Had from the Start" – 3:04
4. "Studying Politics" – 3:31
5. "Left with Alibis and Lying Eyes" – 3:22
6. "Listening to Freddie Mercury" – 2:42
7. "The Weakest" – 4:04
8. "Miss Behavin'" – 3:17
9. "In Between 4th and 2nd Street" – 0:32
10. "The Terrible Secret" – 3:28
11. "In a Lose, Lose Situation" – 3:56
12. "In a Win, Win Situation" – 5:42

Bonus Tracks

1. "Playing With Fire (Acoustic)" - 4:18
2. "The Ponytail Parades (Acoustic)" - 4:21
3. "Walls (Acoustic)" - 3:55
4. "Fractions (Acoustic)" - 4:46
5. "Studying Politics (Acoustic)" - 3:37
6. "Death To Inconvenience (Demo version)" - 3:50
7. "Thoughtlife (Demo version)" - 4:00

== Personnel ==
Emery

- Josh Head - unclean vocals, keyboards, synthesizers, programming, piano
- Toby Morrell - co-lead clean vocals, unclean vocals, additional guitars
- Devin Shelton - co-lead clean vocals, rhythm guitar
- Matt Carter - lead guitar, backing vocals
- Joel "Chopper" Green - bass
- Dave Powell - drums, percussion

Additional musicians

- Melanie Studley - female vocals
- Aaron Sprinkle - keyboards, programming

Deluxe edition production

- Matt Carter - production (tracks 13–19)
- Zach Hodges - mixing
- David Bandesh - mixing (Acoustics version of "Fractions" & "Walls")

Production

- Aaron Sprinkle - production (at Compound Recording, Seattle)
- JR McNeely - mixing (at Compound Recording, Seattle)
- Randy Staub - mixing (in the songs "Studying Politics" & "The Terrible Secret" at the Warehouse Vancouver, BC)
- Troy Glessmer - mastering (at Spectre Studios)
- Aaron Lipinski - assistance engineer
- Aaron Mlasko - drum tech
- Brandon Ebel - executive producer
- Jonathan Dunn - A&R
- Dave Taylor - worldwide representation (for ESU Management)
- Larry Mazer - worldwide representation (for ESU Management)
- Invisible Creature - art direction
- Emery - art direction
- Ryan Clark - design (for Invisible Creature)
- Jerad Knudson - photography

== Notes ==
- There is a short, hidden track at the end of "In a Win, Win Situation".
- On the bonus DVD (from the re-release), there are a few hidden features. In the "Bonus Feature" section, hover the mouse or fiddle with the arrow keys (There's a certain way to do it) until a black Emery logo appears. Clicking on any of those (there are three) will either play the songs "Shift" or "The Secret" or a hidden video. There are also three hidden Emery logos in the "Live Songs" section. They will play the PureVolume version of "To Whom It May Concern", a song called "Xmas Mix" (aka "(Ho Ho Hey) A Way for Santa's Sleigh"), or another hidden video.
- Track 18, 'Death to Inconvenience' is an early version of 'You Think You're Nickel Slick (But I Got Your Penny Change)' from their third album I'm Only a Man.
- Track 19, 'Thoughtlife' is an early version of a song of the same name on their EP While Broken Hearts Prevail

== Awards ==
In 2006, the album was nominated for a Dove Award for Recorded Music Packaging of the Year at the 37th GMA Dove Awards.

== The Question Live (2021) ==
On October 25, 2021, The Question Live, a live album of The Question played by the band live front-to-back and initially released earlier for Emeryland supporters only, was released for streaming services via BC Music.
