= April Kae =

American bass guitar player

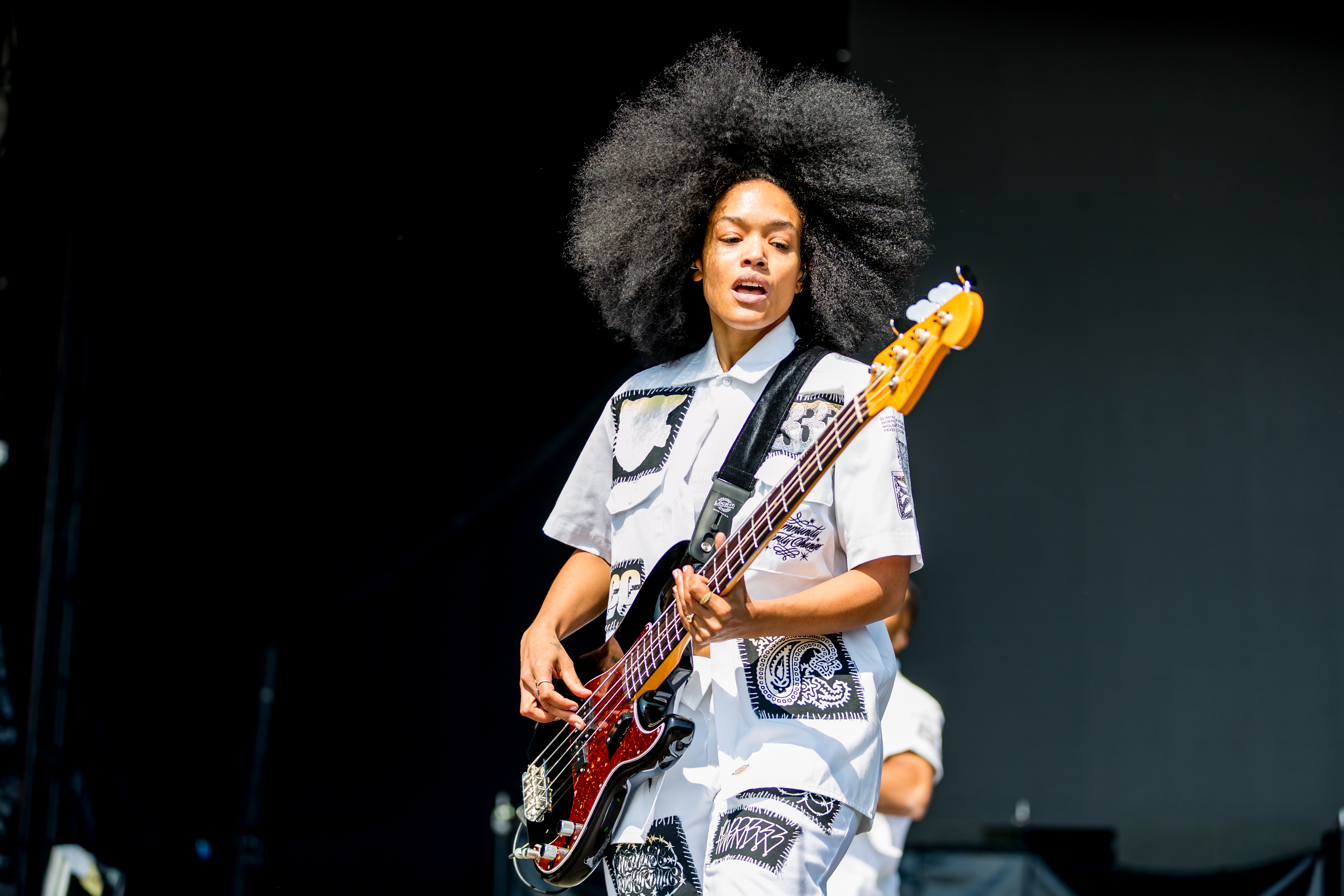
- Kae performing in 2023 with Fever 333

Background information
- Born: Austin, Texas, U.S.
- Occupation: Musician
- Instruments: Bass guitar; vocals
- Member of: Fever 333
- Website: https://www.april-kae.com

April Kae is an American bassist, singer, songwriter and producer. April was born in Austin, Texas, and works in New York City and Los Angeles.

== Early life ==
Kae was exposed to the arts through her mother's work as a music teacher and a vocalist and her father was an instrumentalist during her adolescence. Kae joined the school orchestra playing upright bass at 12. April Kae and her younger sister Nikki were both signed with a modeling agency in Austin, Texas as children. She attributed her comfort in front of the camera on social media to that early experience modeling. Her mother is African American and her Father is Jewish.

At age 12, Kae was exposed to activism through the Quaker church. (Quakers have documented a history of social justice work including but not limited to their involvement with the Underground Railroad in early American history.) She continued combining activism and music as a young teen organizing fundraising concerts for various charitable causes, such as raising money for refugees of the genocide in Darfur and for displaced peoples from Louisiana after Hurricane Katrina.

Kae attended Reed College in Portland, Oregon taking a year-long sabbatical to volunteer as a high school teaching assistant and mentor in Philadelphia. After returning to Reed College, she completed her undergrad with a degree in economics. In 2014, she did a Finance internship in New York City's Wall Street. Kae also attended Temple University for a Master of Social Work.

== Career ==
=== Music ===
In 2025, April Kae performed alongside artist SAINTt JHN as a featured instrumentalist during his set at Coachella Music Festival.

==== FEVER 333 ====
April Kae is the current bass player for American rock band, Fever 333. Kae joined the summer of 2023 for their European tour dates. In several articles covering Fever 333's first performances with a new band member lineup, which includes Kae, she was described as a "viral bass virtuoso." So far, in 2024, April played with Fever 333 as the Sunday headliner at the 2024 X Games in Ventura. Kae is currently set to join Fever 333 on 2025 US tour dates, which include Warped Tour 2025.

==== Music Content ====
Kae went viral on Instagram after posting a bass cover of the Cardi B song “Up”. She chose the song to cover because it was number one on the Spotify 100 list at the time. The cover went viral on Instagram reaching 1.5 million views. Her second viral bass cover was to Bill Withers' “Just the Two of Us”, which was posted to show solidarity with the Stop Asian Hate movement, and received 6 million views. In both videos, Kae plays a white Mexican-made Fender Precision Bass.

===== Fender Artist =====
Kae is a Fender-sponsored artist and designed a custom Fender bass. At the Fender Musical Instruments Corporation event, ‘The “#guitartok” Effect’ in July 2022, April was a featured panelist along with several others, who gathered to discuss TikTok's effect on the music industry as well as the changing landscape of guitar culture. In 2023, as part of her continued her partnership with Fender, April helped launch the Vintera II Series for Fender. Most recently, April was one of the four featured artists in Fender's 2024 "The All New Player II Series" launch, which included a full-scale video campaign in which each artist performed a rendition of "All Day & All of the Night" by The Kinks.

==== Recognition and Partnerships ====
In the past several years, April Kae has been recognized by her peers within the music community in the form of lists, awards, and partnerships. In 2025, April was named as an official Gallien-Krueger Artist. In 2024 Kae was named one of Distorted Sound's "Five Influential Women Leading Rock Music." Also in 2024, Kae partnered with Meta and attended the Variety Hitmaker's Awards Brunch. That same year, in partnership with Positive Grid and She Rocks, Kae served as a featured as part of a panel discussion with several other musicians in honor of International Women's Day. In 2023, Kae was named in Go Magazine's "100 Women We Love: Class of 2023." April Kae was invited to A Celebration of Women in Music: A Pre-Grammy Celebration in 2023, where she received the Woman's Worth Award alongside Nik West and Divinity Roxx.

Other prominent collaborations include a 2023 brand partnership, which included a large-scale commercial, print, and ad campaign with hair company Clairol. The “It’s So Me,” campaign featured Kae, saying she “represents a connection to the modern Clairol woman…” Clariol called Kae, and the other women involved with the campaign, “authentic, self-reliant, and unafraid to be one’s true self.”

Kae was also featured in Vogue Magazine in 2021, and graced the covers of several magazines including, Bass Player, Guitar Girl Magazine, Nylon and NYC Pride Guide 2020. The It Gets Better Project, a nonprofit uplifting LGBTQIA+ youth, shared a video profile of Kae as part of their initiative highlighting prominent Queer voices.

=== Other ventures ===
==== IMANIGOLD (2013-2023) ====
IMANIGOLD is both the name of the band, as well as the name of the art and social justice collective created by April and Nikki Kae, which includes a digital publication that discusses a range of social justice issues. April Kae wrote, sang, produced, and played bass for the band IMANIGOLD, and Nikki Kae was the visual director for the band, as well as contributing to the vocals, guitar, and writing. IMANIGOLD released their single “CONTINENTAL DRIFT” in 2021 and was entirely self-produced and released by the duo. The single would later be featured on their self-titled EP released in 2022. Imanigold was a decade-long project that is on a break as of 2023.
