= The Dream Alive =

EP by Vocal Few
- Released: October 30, 2015
- Genre: Folk, folk pop, indie folk
- Length: 23:23
- Label: Bad Christian

The Dream Alive is the third extended play from Vocal Few. Bad Christian Music released the EP on October 30, 2015.

== Critical reception ==
Professional ratings
Review scores
Source	Rating
HM Magazine	4.5/5 stars
Jesus Freak Hideout	4/5 stars

Awarding the EP four stars at Jesus Freak Hideout, Christopher Smith writes, "The Dream Alive is another stellar entry for an exciting artist." Kevin Hoskins, giving the EP four stars from Jesus Freak Hideout, states, "Most songs during the six-track ensemble could be defined as thought-provoking tunes where Matt and Kristie share the vocals and blend beautifully." Rating the EP four and a half stars for HM Magazine, Patrick Duncan says, "Music like this inspires me to slow down, pour my favorite beverage and relax on the porch...Music done this well doesn’t require analyzing to the nth degree. Just drop the needle as you watch the sunset."

== Track list ==
Track list
No.	Title	Length
1.	"The Corner Dwellers"	4:03
2.	"Time"	4:28
3.	"Take Me Back Again"	4:16
4.	"The Dream Alive"	3:10
5.	"You've Been Written"	3:40
6.	"Blue"	3:51
Total length:		23:23

== Chart performance ==
Chart (2015)	Peak position
US Folk Albums (Billboard)	12
US Heatseekers Albums (Billboard)	15
