= I'm Only a Man =

Studio album by Emery
- Released: October 2, 2007
- Recorded: 2007
- Studios: Dark Horse Studios, Franklin, TN
- Genres: Post-hardcore; emo; progressive rock
- Length: 48:28
- Label: Tooth & Nail
- Producers: Ryan Boesch; Matt Carter; Emery (co.)

Emery chronology
The Question (2005)	I'm Only a Man (2007)	While Broken Hearts Prevail (2008)

Alternative cover
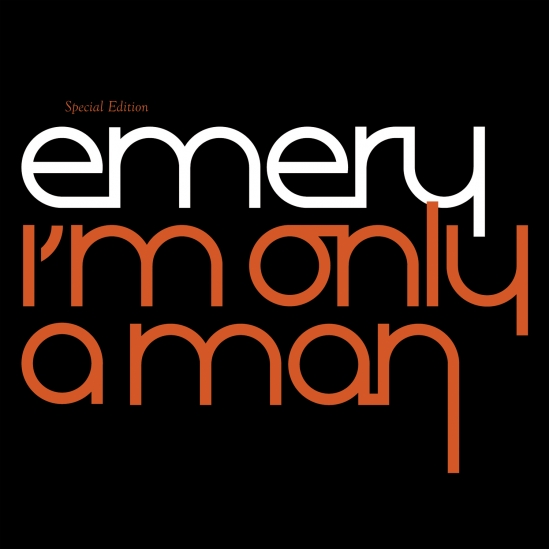
- Special edition

Professional ratings
Review scores
Source	Rating
AbsolutePunk.net	(67%)
AllMusic	4/5 stars
Cross Rhythms	8/10 stars
Jesus Freak Hideout	4.5/5 stars
Alternative Press	3/5 stars

I'm Only a Man is the third album released by the post-hardcore band Emery.

== Release ==
Emery debuted some tracks from I'm Only a Man while touring with Underoath in summer 2007, and on July 29, 2007, they released "The Party Song," which was followed by "Rock-N-Rule" on August 16, "After the Devil Beats His Wife" on September 17, and "Don't Bore Us, Get to the Chorus" on September 24, 2007. Four days later the album was leaked onto the internet in its entirety.

== Style changes ==
Emery's style shifted even further from their debut than had The Question. The sound of I'm Only a Man is much more accessible and less aggressive than their past records.

Due to bassist Joel Green's departure from Emery prior to the making of I'm Only a Man, guitarist Matt Carter decided to maintain simple guitar parts in comparison to prior releases, instead having the album rely mainly on the bass and keyboard to be the musical focus.

== Track listing ==
All tracks are written by Emery.

No.	Title	Length
1.	"Rock-n-Rule"	3:38
2.	"The Party Song"	3:31
3.	"World Away"	3:38
4.	"After the Devil Beats His Wife"	4:31
5.	"Can't Stop the Killer"	3:32
6.	"Story About a Man with a Bad Heart"	3:28
7.	"Don't Bore Us, Get to the Chorus"	3:33
8.	"What Makes a Man a Man"	4:24
9.	"The Movie Song"	3:09
10.	"You Think You're Nickel Slick (But I Got Your Penny Change)"	3:45
11.	"From Crib to Coffin"	10:44
Total length:		48:28

Special Edition Bonus Tracks
No.	Title	Length
12.	"Don't Bore Us, Get to the Chorus" (Acoustic/Live)	3:34
13.	"Listening to Freddie Mercury" (Acoustic/Live)	3:13
14.	"The Ponytail Parades" (Acoustic/Live)	4:23
15.	"As Your Voice Fades" (Acoustic/Live)	4:14
16.	"What Makes a Man a Man" (Acoustic/Live)	4:33

iTunes Bonus Track
No.	Title	Length
12.	"Whoa! Man"	3:15

- Bonus DVD
- Documentary
- Take Action Tour: Lawrence, KS. March 10, 2007
- 1. The Ponytail Parades
- 2. The Movie Song
- 3. Walls
- 4. Playing with Fire
- 5. Rock-N-Rule
- 6. In a Win, Win Situation
- 7. So Cold I Could See My Breath
- 8. Studying Politics
- Acoustic Tour: Lawrence, KS. July 19, 2007
- 1. Listening to Freddie Mercury
- 2. Fractions
- 3. Don't Bore Us, Get to the Chorus
- 4. The Ponytail Parades
- 5. What Makes a Man a Man
- 6. Anne Marie
- 7. World Away
- 8. Playing with Fire
- 9. As Your Voice Fades
- 10. In a Win, Win Situation
- 11. Studying Politics
- 12. White Christmas
- 13. Walls

== Personnel ==
Credits adapted from AllMusic:

Emery

- Toby Morrell – co-lead clean vocals, bass
- Josh Head – unclean vocals, keyboards, synthesizers, programming, piano
- Matt Carter – lead guitar, bass, backing vocals
- Devin Shelton – rhythm guitar, bass, co-lead clean vocals
- Dave Powell – drums

Production

- Ryan Boesh – producer, engineer, mixing (5, 10, 11)
- Matt Carter – producer, engineer, mixing (5, 10, 11)
- Emery – co-producers
- Dan Korneff – mixing (1)
- David Bendeth – mixing (2, 4, 9)
- J.R. McNeely – mixing (3, 6–8)
- Colin Heldt – assistant engineer
- John Ziemski – assistant engineer
- Jeff Gall – assistant engineer
- Blake "Poochie" Plonsky – studio drum technician, additional percussion
- Troy Glessner – mastering
- Ryan Clark – design
- Jerad Knudson – photography

== I’m Only A Man - Studio Update and Live Version (2020–2021) ==
In 2020, Emery completely re-recorded, remixed and remastered the whole album from scratch and released it exclusively on vinyl as I'm Only a Man (Studio Update).

On September 27, 2021, I'm Only a Man (Studio Update), live albums I'm Only A Man (Live Version) and The Weak's End (Live Version) were released for streaming services via BC Music.
