= Matt & Toby =

Studio album by Matt & Toby
- Released: October 19, 2012
- Genre: Acoustic, indie rock, electronic
- Length: 42:36
- Label: Tooth & Nail
- Producer: Brandon Ebel (exec.); Matt Carter

Matt & Toby chronology
Matt & Toby (2012)	I Quit Church (2017)

Professional ratings
Review scores
Source	Rating
Absolute Punk	6.5/10 stars
Jesus Freak Hideout	4/5 stars
Sputnikmusic	3/5 stars

Matt & Toby is a debut studio album by Matt & Toby, a side project of Matt Carter and Toby Morrell (both of Emery). The album was released on November 19, 2012 through Tooth & Nail Records.

== History ==
On January 10, 2011 an official MySpace page for Carter and Morrell's duo-project named The Water and the Well was registered. The page contains three songs: "Do Lord", "Take Me Oh Lord" and "Prodigal Sons & Daughters". The latter two songs later would be re-recorded for Matt & Toby's album. The page was last visited by the founder on January 19, 2011.

On March 5, 2012 an official Facebook page for the same project, but named Matt & Toby, appeared.

Specifically, We (Toby and I) have been wanting to do less aggressive music as well as the heavy stuff we do in Emery. Sometimes we do "acoustic emery" and everyone seems to really like it, so instead of shifting the direction, Emery will continue its sound. We are just ADDING a whole new band to satisfy what we want to do. Matt and Toby will be exploring all the territory of acoustic-electronic-vintage and modern stuff. We are using horns, piano, drums, synthesizers and what ever else we can come up with instead of distorted guitar and screaming. It will be adventurous and dramatic.

— Matt Carter, Matt & Toby's Facebook page

== Release and promotion ==
On July 13, 2012 the first song off the album, "Good Boys", was made available as a free download through the official Facebook page of the band.

On October 17, 2012 a lyric video for "What Plays In My Head" was released through the band's official YouTube channel.

On November 1, 2012, Altpress.com premiered the song "Life of the Party" and on November 6, 2012 - a music video for it.

On November 8, 2012, Absolutepunk.com premiered the song "Prodigal Sons and Daughters".

In the support of the album the band toured a "Living Room Tour" from October 15 to November 9, 2012 and from January 26 to February 9, 2013. During the shows Matt & Toby played songs from the self-titled album as well as Emery songs and some covers in acoustic.

== Track listing ==
All songs composed by Matt Carter & Toby Morrell.

No.	Title	Length
1.	"Life of the Party"	4:17
2.	"You Will Sing"	3:57
3.	"Oh No"	4:29
4.	"What Plays in My Head"	4:44
5.	"Take Me Oh Lord In Thy Hands"	4:21
6.	"Good Boys"	3:02
7.	"Prodigal Sons and Daughters"	4:09
8.	"Sunday Morning, February 12th"	4:32
9.	"Come Home"	3:56
10.	"The Last One"	5:09
Total length:		42:36

== Personnel ==
Matt & Toby

- Toby Morell – lead vocals
- Matt Carter – bass, drums, engineer, guitar, keyboards, programming, producer, vocals

Additional personnel

- Brandon Ebel - executive producer
- Brett Baird - additional engineering and editing
- Ryan Clark - design
- Conor Farley - A&R
- Lindsay Gardner - violin and cello (3)
- Troy Glessner - mastering
- Nadia Ifland - violin and cello (3)
- James Kim - trumpet (3, 5, 9)
- Andy King - drums (1)
- Dan Korneff - mixing
- Aaron Lunsford - drums (8)
- Dave Powell - drums (7)
- Aya T Sato - photography
- Julianna Smith - violin and cello (3)
- Aaron Sprinkle - additional creativity, opinions, and engineering
- Blake Strickland - trombone (3, 9)
