= While Broken Hearts Prevail =

EP by Emery
- Released: October 28, 2008
- Genre: Post-hardcore
- Length: 24:23
- Label: Tooth & Nail
- Producer: Matt Carter

Emery chronology
I'm Only a Man (2007)	While Broken Hearts Prevail (2008)	...In Shallow Seas We Sail (2009)

Professional ratings
Review scores
Source	Rating
AbsolutePunk	49%
Alt Press	4/5 stars

While Broken Hearts Prevail is an EP by rock band Emery that was released on October 28, 2008. Musically the album returns to heavier sound found on Emery's debut album The Weak's End instead of the alternative sound on the band's previous release I'm Only a Man.

"The Smile, the Face" and "Edge of the World" would later appear on ...In Shallow Seas We Sail. "Always Depends" is a re-recording of a track from the band's debut EP The Columbus EEP Thee.

== Track listing ==
No.	Title	Length
1.	"The Smile, the Face"	2:45
2.	"Edge of the World"	3:50
3.	"Say the Things (You Want)"	3:03
4.	"Ten Talents"	3:28
5.	"Always Depends"	3:40
6.	"Thoughtlife"	3:45
7.	"Do the Things (You Want)"	3:50
Total length:		24:23

Digital download bonus track
No.	Title	Length
8.	"Thoughtlife" (alternate version)	3:41

== Personnel ==
Credits adapted from album’s liner notes.

Emery

- Toby Morrell – clean vocals, bass
- Devin Shelton – clean vocals, bass
- Matt Carter – guitar, backing vocals
- Josh Head – screaming vocals, keyboards, synthesizers, programming, percussion
- Dave Powell – drums, percussion

Production

- Matt Carter – engineer, producer
- Matt Talbott – additional recording
- David Bendeth – mixing
- Dan Korneff – mixing
- Toby Morrell – assistant mixing
- Troy Glessner – mastering
- Ryan Clark – design
- Emery – art Direction
- Marc Johns – cover art
- Scott Andrews – handwriting, management
- Greg Lutze – band photo
- Jon Dunn – A&R
