= You Were Never Alone =

Studio album by Emery
- Released: May 19, 2015
- Genre: Post-hardcore, Christian alternative rock
- Length: 41:08
- Label: BadChristian, Rude
- Producer: Matt Carter, Aaron Sprinkle (add.)

Emery chronology
We Do What We Want (2011)	You Were Never Alone (2015)	Eve (2018)

Professional ratings
Review scores
Source	Rating
Indie Vision Music	4/5 stars
Jesus Freak Hideout	4.5/5 stars

You Were Never Alone is the sixth studio album by the American rock band Emery, released on May 19, 2015. It is the first album to be released through the band's own independent label BadChristian and Rude Records.

== Recording, release and promotion ==
In March 2014, the band released a demo of two new songs.

The album was funded via IndieGoGo crowdfunding campaign and was set to be released in mid-2014 but the release date was later pushed back. In addition to the album, the band was also going to release a music video, a re-recorded version of song "Anne Marie" and an acoustic EP/LP due to the achievement of the "stretch goals" during the crowdfunding project.

Starting with the March 23, 2015 episode of the Break It Down podcast with Matt Carter, Matt Carter, the host of the show and the lead guitarist of Emery, along with guest Toby Morrell, the lead singer of Emery, began a 12-episode series to premier one song from the album for each episode. Toby and Matt also discussed the process of writing and recording each of the songs on the episode on which it premiered.

On April 28, 2015, the band released a music video for the song "Hard Times".

An instrumental version of You Were Never Alone was released on March 20, 2020.

== Meaning and biblical allusions ==
In the first twelve episodes of Matt Carter's Break it Down Podcast, he and Toby Morrell went through each song and explained the process of creating them. Then in October 2015, Toby and Matt made another podcast further revealing that the album was a concept album where each song is a story from the Bible told in first-person.

Song name	Biblical Story
Rock, Pebble, Stone	The story of Jesus being baptized, going into the wilderness, and encountering the devil.
Thrash	The story of Stephen preaching his beliefs, being stoned, and then going to heaven.
Hard Times	Samson and Delilah.
The Beginning	Adam and Eve.
The Less You Say	Peter defending Jesus in the garden.
Pink Slip	Moses vs Pharaoh in Cairo
To The Deep	Noah and Abraham.
What's Stopping You	Mary and Joseph. Joseph's perspective on Mary and immaculate conception.
Go Wrong Young Man	Paul on the road to Damascus.
Taken for a Bath	King David and his affair with Bathsheba
Salvatore Wryhta	This song is about Jesus praying to the Father in the garden of Gethsemane.
Alone	Jesus alone on the cross, subjected to the wrath of God for our sins. Also the origin of the album title.

== Track listing ==
All songs composed by Toby Morrell and Matt Carter

No.	Title	Length
1.	"Rock, Pebble, Stone"	3:56
2.	"Thrash"	4:27
3.	"Hard Times"	3:59
4.	"The Beginning"	3:04
5.	"The Less You Say"	3:15
6.	"Pink Slip"	3:20
7.	"To the Deep"	3:38
8.	"What's Stopping You"	3:50
9.	"Go Wrong Young Man"	2:40
10.	"Taken for a Bath"	3:37
11.	"Salvatore Wryhta"	2:38
12.	"Alone"	2:43
Total length:		41:08

== Personnel ==
Emery

- Toby Morrell – lead clean vocals, bass, screamed vocals
- Matt Carter – guitar, backing vocals
- Josh Head – keyboard, screamed vocals
- Devin Shelton – co-lead clean vocals
- Dave Powell – drums, percussion

Production

- Matt Carter – producer, engineer
- Aaron Sprinkle – additional production, additional engineering
- Brett Baird – additional engineering
- Beau Burchell – mixing
- Troy Glessner – mastering
- Andrew Nyte – additional arranging
- Chad Gardner – additional arranging
- Alexander C. Sprungle – art direction, design, photography

== Chart performance ==
Chart (2015)	Peak position
US Billboard 200	69
US Top Alternative Albums (Billboard)	8
US Top Christian Albums (Billboard)	1
US Independent Albums (Billboard)	6
US Top Rock Albums (Billboard)	10
