= We Do What We Want =

Studio album by Emery
- Released: March 29, 2011
- Recorded: 2010
- Genres: Post-hardcore; metalcore
- Length: 39:49
- Labels: Tooth & Nail; Solid State
- Producer: Matt Carter

Emery chronology
...In Shallow Seas We Sail (2009)	We Do What We Want (2011)	You Were Never Alone (2015)

Professional ratings
Review scores
Source	Rating
AllMusic	3.5/5 stars
Alternative Press	3.5/5 stars
HM	4/5 stars
Indie Vision Music	3/5
Jesus Freak Hideout	4.5/5 stars
Sputnikmusic	(4/5)

We Do What We Want is the fifth studio album by the American rock band Emery. The album was released on March 29, 2011, through Tooth & Nail Records and Solid State Records. Shortly after announcing the release of We Do What We Want, founding member Devin Shelton announced he would be taking an indefinite hiatus from Emery.

== Writing ==
Emery was in the process of working on more stripped-down acoustic album when guitarist/vocalist Devin Shelton decided to take an indefinite leave of absence from the group. After his departure, the remaining four members made the conscious decision to write a heavier and more hardcore album than they had done in the past. Commenting on the band's evolved sound, bassist/vocalist Toby Morrell said, "I don't think we ever thought we'd get as heavy as we are now, but I'm glad we have." Though Shelton was not an active member of Emery during the writing process for We Do What We Want, he wrote the final track on the standard edition titled "Fix Me" and the song "Crumbling" from the deluxe edition.

=== Lyrics ===
Regarding the album's lyrical themes, vocalist Toby Morrell stated:

I think this is our most personal, spiritual album. It talks about our faith and God, but it never gets too preachy, because it's basically talking about me and things I've gone through... I can't not tell the truth of who I am, and this time I explored that even further—just points in my life, or in the other guys' lives. Some lyrics are about challenging authority and God, and is God real, and what that even means.

== Release and promotion ==
In the month of March 2011, an MP3 for the song "Scissors" was divided into seven sections. For seven consecutive days, one new piece of the song was revealed through a different online media outlet. The band would give a clue as to where the next clip would be released on their Facebook page, and fans were encouraged to collect all of the parts and put the song back together. Also prior to the release of We Do What We Want, Emery previewed "The Cheval Glass," "I Never Got to See the West Coast" and "The Curse of Perfect Days."

We Do What We Want was released on March 29, 2011, through Tooth & Nail Records, and it is also Emery's first album co-released by Tooth & Nail's heavy metal/hardcore punk subdivision Solid State Records. Vocalist Toby Morell has said that he was proud of the signing to Solid State, and also described it as "just kind of a good feeling to be wanted by another part of your company and be able to join all the awesome bands".

== Track listing ==
All songs composed by Emery, except "Fix Me" composed by Devin Shelton.

No.	Title	Length
1.	"The Cheval Glass"	3:16
2.	"Scissors"	3:14
3.	"The Anchors"	3:48
4.	"The Curse of Perfect Days"	4:27
5.	"You Wanted It"	4:16
6.	"I'm Not Here for Rage I'm Here for Revenge"	3:53
7.	"Daddy's Little Peach"	4:02
8.	"Addicted to Bad Decisions"	4:17
9.	"I Never Got to See the West Coast"	4:40
10.	"Fix Me"	3:56
Total length:		39:49

Deluxe edition bonus tracks
No.	Title	Length
11.	"Crumbling"	4:12
12.	"The Curse of Perfect Days" (Acoustic)	4:22

== Personnel ==
Emery

- Toby Morell – lead vocals, bass
- Matt Carter – guitar, backing vocals
- Josh Head – keyboards, synthesizers, programming, backing vocals
- Dave Powell – drums, percussion

Production

- Produced and engineered by Matt Carter at Compound Recording
- Additional production and vocals by Aaron Sprinkle
- Assisted by Matt Clear, Doug Finley and Jake Thomson
- Tracks 1–6 mixed by Jason Suecof
- Tracks 7, 8 and 10 mixed by Craig Alvin
- Track 9 mixed by Matt Carter
- Additional mixing by Rick Senechal
- Mastered by Troy Glessner at Spectre South
- Executive producer: Brandon Ebel
- Additional arranging by Zack Ordway, Ryan Macoubrie and Kyle Phillips
