= Emery (band) =

American post-hardcore band

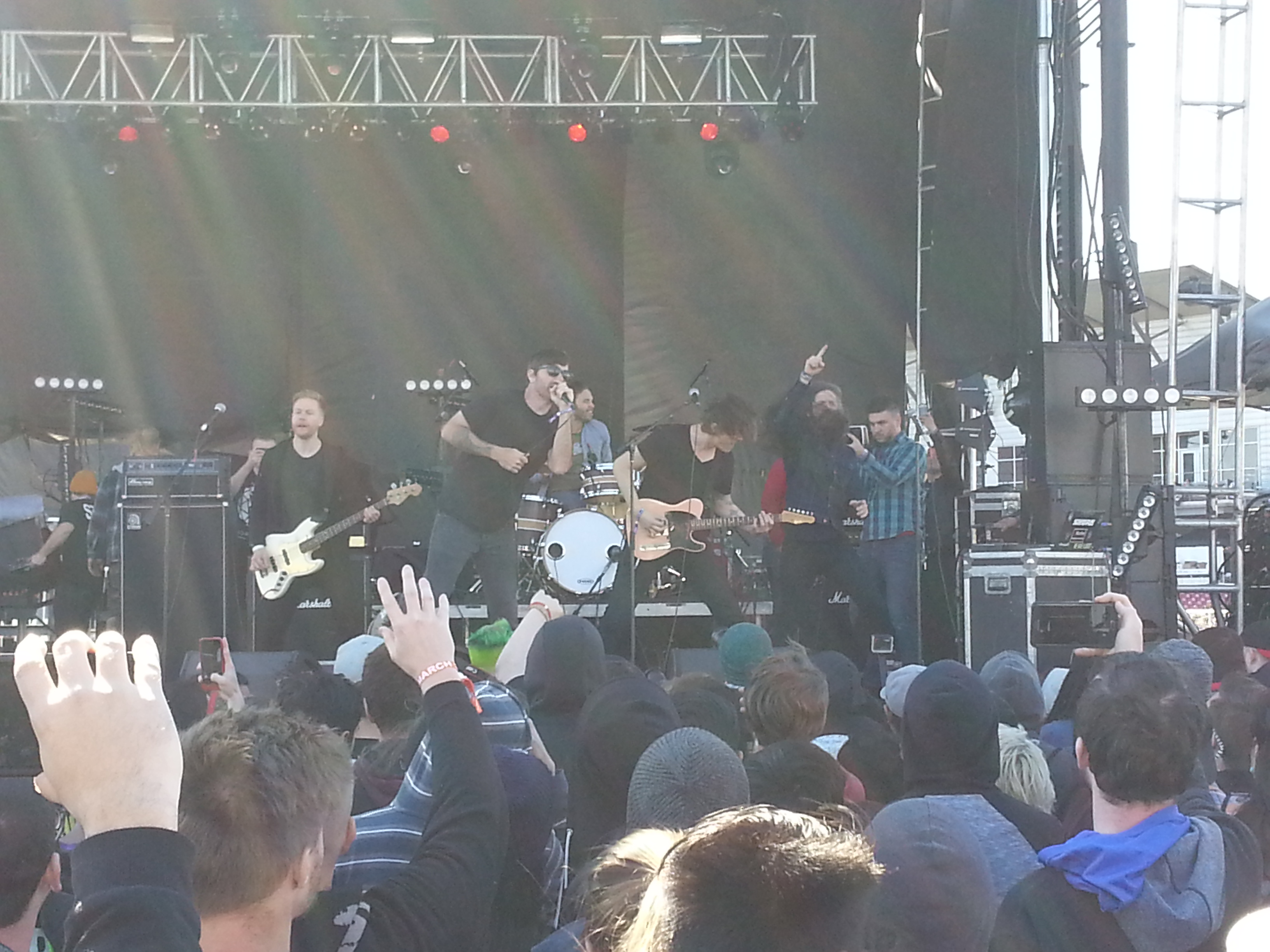
- Emery performing in 2016

Background information
- Origin: Rock Hill, South Carolina, U.S.
- Genres: Post-hardcore; melodic hardcore; hard rock; alternative rock; emo
- Years active: 2001–present
- Labels: Solid State, Tooth & Nail, BadChristian, Emeryland
- Spinoffs: Matt & Toby
- Spinoff of: Sachul, Joe 747, Simply Waynes, Oogie Brown
- Members: Toby Morrell; Matt Carter; Josh Head; Dave Powell; Devin Shelton; Chris Keene
- Past members: Seth Studley; Joel Green; Joey Svendsen
- Website: www.emerymusic.com

Emery is an American rock band formed in Rock Hill, South Carolina, in 2001. The band eventually relocated to Seattle, Washington, in order to reach a more music-centered scene. As of 2026, Emery have released ten studio albums, four live albums, and numerous EPs and singles.

== History ==
=== 2000s: Formation and peak years ===
Emery formed in 2001 in Rock Hill, South Carolina, but moved to Seattle in search of a better musical environment. The band was named after a first grader that Toby Morrell met while working as an intern for a teacher in college. The four members in the band at the time, Toby Morrell (vocals/guitar), Devin Shelton (drums), Matt Carter (guitar/keyboards), and Joel "Chopper" Green (bass) left Rock Hill for Seattle on September 11, the day of the terrorist attacks; they found out about the attacks when they stopped at a Cracker Barrel restaurant in North Carolina. After a little while Seth Studley, who was one of the original members of the band, broke out of a serious relationship and followed them to Seattle and resumed his post as drummer. Because Seth took over drums, Devin took the position of guitarist.

After making Emerald City their new home in Seattle, Emery signed a record deal with Tooth & Nail Records, also of Seattle, in 2002. Wasting no time, Emery paired up with producer/engineer Ed Rose and worked on their debut album, The Weak's End. It was produced at the Black Lodge Studio in Eudora, Kansas. The record was released in January 2004 by Tooth & Nail Records. Emery toured extensively to promote their new release.

While touring, Seth Studley decided to leave the band in order to get married and Emery had to look for a new drummer. While touring with Haste the Day, Dave Powell was brought out to audition. Powell was officially put in the band in November 2005. Powell originally played in the Indianapolis-based metalcore/hardcore band The Bowels of Judas.

Soon after touring, Emery went back into the studio to record their next record with production done by Aaron Sprinkle this time around. The band took five weeks in recording sessions. The Question was released on August 2, 2005. "Studying Politics" was released as the album's first single with a video emerging on June 29, 2005. On November 21, 2006, Emery re-released The Question, adding a DVD, five acoustic versions of previously recorded songs and two new demo tracks, which were produced by Matt Carter. The DVD included a documentary film of Emery, live songs and bonus footage.

After the re-release, Joel "Chopper" Green was asked to leave the band. On September 19, 2006, Emery posted a blog on their website explaining the departure. After Green's departure, Devin and Toby both took over duty as bassist. Typically, whoever doesn't have lead vocals on a song is the one playing bass.

While touring with Underoath in Australia, Emery announced that they were releasing a new album, I'm Only a Man, which leaked onto the internet before its official release on October 2, 2007. It was produced by Ryan Boesch and Matt Carter and recorded at Dark Horse Recording Studio in Tennessee. It received mixed reviews. Emery released a deluxe edition of the album as well, which featured four acoustic songs that were recorded while on the Take Action Tour with The Red Jumpsuit Apparatus and DVD with live footage and a documentary. The iTunes version of the deluxe edition also added a bonus track called "Whoa! Man".

Emery announced in an interview on TVU that they finished a new 8-track EP entitled While Broken Hearts Prevail, which was released on October 28, 2008. They began premiering some of the new material while on tour opening for The Almost, including "Edge of the World".

In an interview with Toby Morrell, Emery announced that they would be releasing a new album called ...In Shallow Seas We Sail. Up until the announcement of Emery re-signing to Tooth & Nail Records, it was unsure if the band would seek a new label, since their contract had expired. They re-signed with Tooth & Nail and soon gave out information on their new release.

On April 7, 2009, Emery released a new song entitled "Cutthroat Collapse" on their Myspace, Purevolume, and iTunes. On May 29, 2009, Emery put ...In Shallow Seas We Sail in its entirety up on their Myspace. On June 2, 2009, ...In Shallow Seas We Sail was officially released. Emery also confirmed during a chat thread on AbsolutePunk that their first music video off of the new album was going to be "Cutthroat Collapse".

During their headlining U.S. tour, Emery had selected dates filmed for a DVD in the works. The release date is unknown at this time. Emery set out on tour supporting Underoath on their fall/winter headlining tour for the rest of the year. In the summer of 2010 they went on the "Scream it Like You Mean it" tour with Silverstein, Ivoryline, Dance Gavin Dance, We Came as Romans, Sky Eats Airplane, and I Set My Friends on Fire.

=== 2010s: Continued career ===
On January 26, 2011, it was announced that the band's fifth album, We Do What We Want, was set to be released on March 29, 2011. The band also released a clip of a song titled "Scissors". Another song titled "Curse of Perfect Days" was released to Christian rock radio stations.

On January 31, 2011, vocalist, rhythm guitarist, and bassist Devin Shelton announced he was taking an "indefinite hiatus" from Emery.

On February 1, 2011, a song titled "The Cheval Glass" was released on the band's Facebook, YouTube and Myspace page. On February 17, 2011, the band announced that We Do What We Want would be released through both Tooth & Nail and their hardcore/metal subdivision Solid State Records reflecting the heavier sound of the album. "Lyrically I think this is our most personal, spiritual album. It talks about our faith and God, but it never gets too preachy, because it's basically talking about me and things I've gone through," shares Morrell. "I can't not tell the truth of who I am, and this time I explored that even further — just points in my life, or in the other guys' lives. Some lyrics are about challenging authority and God, and is God real, and what that even means. "

Emery headlined the "Do What You Want" tour alongside the bands To Speak of Wolves, and Hawkboy (formerly As Cities Burn). While on tour, the band has announced that they would be coming out with an acoustic album. On March 28, 2011, Emery released a stream of their new album We Do What We Want on AOL.com.

On May 9, 2011, Emery released a music video for the song "The Cheval Glass". On August 9 they released a music video for the song "Scissors".

On October 18, 2011, Tooth & Nail released Ten Years, a compilation album gleaned from Emery's first four albums. In 2012, Matt Carter and Toby Morrell worked on the acoustic project titled Matt & Toby. As a result, a self-titled album was released on November 19, 2012, through Tooth & Nail Records. In the support of the album Matt & Toby toured a "Living Room Tour" in October–November 2012 and January–February 2013. During the shows they played songs from the album as well as Emery songs and some covers in acoustic.

In 2013, Emery left Tooth & Nail/Solid State Records and established their own label, BadChristian Music. In 2013–2014, Emery played a two-part The Weak's End 10th Anniversary tour where it was joined by Devin Shelton.

Emery's sixth studio album You Were Never Alone, funded via crowdfunding, was set to be released in mid-2014 but the release date was later pushed back. On April 28, 2015, the band released a music video for the song "Hard Times". You Were Never Alone was released on May 19, 2015, via BadChristian Music, and it appeared on several Billboard charts: No. 69 on the Billboard 200, No. 1 on Top Christian Albums, No. 6 on Independent Albums, No. 8 on Alternative Music No. 10 on Top Rock Albums and No. 31 on Top Album Sales.

In June 2015, guitarist Matt Carter began releasing his podcast Break It Down With Matt Carter. The first 12 episodes were a track-by-track breakdown of You Were Never Alone featuring interview with other band members, producers, and friends from other bands. In October 2015, Carter and Morrell released a two-part episode of the Break It Down podcast explaining how You Were Never Alone is a concept album, with each song's lyrics inspired by a story from the Bible.

On December 14, 2015, the band released an eight-track EP, We Wish You Emery Christmas, as a free download.

On April 30, 2016, Emery released an Emery Acoustic: Live in Houston EP.

On March 17, 2017, Emery started a crowdfunding campaign for the next album with the $50,000 goal reached one day after the campaign start. Every backer was given an instant download of Emery: Classics Reimagined EP including re-done versions of "So Cold I Can See My Breath", "As Your Voice Fades", and "The Smile, The Face".

On November 17, 2017, Emery released Revival: Emery Classic Reimagined, an album containing all three tracks from Emery: Classics Reimagined EP plus seven more songs from the band's catalogue rearranged in acoustic.

On November 9, 2018, Emery released their seventh album, Eve.

In 2019, a limited four-track 15 Year Anniversary Split EP was released by Hawthorne Heights and Emery exclusively for their co-headlined 15 Year Anniversary Tour that year. The split was only made available on CD for VIP tour bundle packages, and was ultimately released on streaming services on November 24, 2024, titled Hawthorne Heights / Emery EP.

=== 2020s: Recent activity ===
On June 5, 2020, Emery released their eighth album: White Line Fever. The band has stated on social media that the album's themes are built heavily around the terrorist attacks of September 11, 2001, and where the band was during the occurrence of the events, as they'd just left their home town and departed for Seattle the day of.

In 2021, Emery released I'm Only a Man (Studio Update) — a new, rerecorded from scratch, remixed and remastered version of their 2007 album I'm Only A Man — and three live albums, The Weak's End (Live Version), The Question (Live) and I'm Only a Man (Live Version).

On November 23, 2021, Emery released a live captured version of their then-upcoming ninth studio album Rub Some Dirt on It. The album was released on June 24, 2022, via Tooth & Nail Records.

On November 25, 2022, Emery released Blue Christmas EP. On March 31, 2023, Songs We Love EP, a cover songs compilation, was released.

In February 2026, the band was announced as part of the lineup for the Louder Than Life music festival in Louisville, scheduled to take place in September.

== Style ==
While the band is not labeled a "Christian band", the members are all Christian, exploring a wide variety of lyrical themes in their music. The band sound varies between post-hardcore, melodic hardcore, emo, hard rock, alternative rock, and metalcore.

== BadChristian, Knuckle Breakers and Emeryland ==
In early 2010s Toby Morrell, Matt Carter and their friend, pastor and former Emery bassist Joey Svendsen ran a blog titled Un-learning, where they wrote about moral and religious issues. The intent was usually to hold open discussions about sensitive topics, while getting a variety of different viewpoints (Christian, atheist, etc.) In 2013, Un-learning was rebooted as BadChristian. In addition to being a blog, BadChristian also served as a podcast where the three hosted discussions with guests such as Underoath, Norma Jean and Thrice among others. BadChristian also served as the band's own label titled BC Music. The label roster included Emery, Matt & Toby, The Classic Crime, Vocal Few, Kings Kaleidoscope, Abandon Kansas, Pacific Gold, Zach Bolen (of Citizens & Saints) and House of Heroes. In mid 2010s, BadChristian published numerous e-books (such as "BadChristian, Great Savior", "The M Word", and BadChristian Tackles the Lighter Topics) and released the BadChristian app for iOS, Android, and Windows Phone, which provided free mobile access to the BC blog, podcasts and some BC Music releases.

In 2021, BadChristian's YouTube channel containing all the materials since 2013, was renamed to Knuckle Breakers. On November 24, 2021, Emery released a video version of their ninth studio album, Rub Some Dirt On It, via Knuckle Breakers YouTube Channel.

In 2019, Emery launched a fan club named Emeryland. Emeryland membership gave access to exclusive recordings and releases (such as In Shallow Seas We Sail (Live) and Palmetto EP), exclusive merch items, Knuckle Breakers Discord community, etc. BadChristian podcast was rebooted as Songs & Stories podcast, and moved to Emeryland fan club.

== Side projects ==
- Toby Morrell had a side project entitled I Am Waldo. The music is based on the book of Psalms and mostly acoustic.
- Devin Shelton's side project was called Devinitely. Initially, his music was mostly R&B and was made using GarageBand. After parting ways with Emery in 2011, Shelton decided to play solo under his own name and released a debut album, Life & Death, on January 22, 2013. It features 10 tracks, including an alternative version of "Crumbling", which was originally released as a bonus track for Emery's We Do What We Want (2011). Shelton released his follow-up album, Sensation, on January 6, 2017. It features 12 tracks.
- Dave Powell is in an indie rock band called Beyond Oceans with Jason Barnes and Brennan Chaulk (both formerly of Haste the Day). In early 2013, he agreed to play drums on the upcoming reunion/farewell album by Trenches, but later was replaced by original band drummer Zach Frizzell.
- Matt Carter and Toby Morrell joined forces to create a side project named Matt & Toby. They released one full length, self-titled album in October 2012 under this side project and were on various living room tours in the United States following its release. Carter and Morrell have said they look to release more music under this name. In 2017, the project released I Quit Church.

== Band members ==
Current members

- Toby Morrell — lead vocals (2001–present), bass (2006–present, studio only 2011–2015), guitar (2001, 2022–present)
- Devin Shelton — lead vocals (2001–2011, 2013–2014, 2015–present), bass (2006–2011, 2013–2014, 2022–present), guitar (2001–2009), drums, percussion, backing vocals (2001)
- Matt Carter — guitar, backing vocals (2001–present), keyboards, synthesizer (2001, 2022–present), bass (2006–2009)
- Josh Head — keyboards, synthesizer, backing vocals (2002–present), percussion (2022–present)
- Dave Powell — drums, percussion (2005–present)
- Chris Keene — guitar, backing vocals (2017–present)

Former members

- Joey Svendsen — bass (2001)
- Joel "Chopper" Green — bass (2001–2006)
- Seth Studley — drums, percussion (2001–2004)

Former touring musicians

- Andy Nichols – bass, backing vocals (2011–2013, 2015), drums, percussion (2016; substitute for Dave Powell)
- Dane Andersen – drums, percussion (2012; substitute for Dave Powell)
- Andrew Nyte – drums, percussion (2013; substitute for Dave Powell)
- Jeremy Spring – bass, backing vocals (2014)
- Matt MacDonald – bass, backing vocals (2015)

== Discography ==
- The Weak's End (2004)
- The Question (2005)
- I'm Only a Man (2007)
- ...In Shallow Seas We Sail (2009)
- We Do What We Want (2011)
- You Were Never Alone (2015)
- Eve (2018)
- White Line Fever (2020)
- Rub Some Dirt on It (2022)
- Styrofoam (2026)
