= ...In Shallow Seas We Sail =

Studio album by Emery
- Released: June 2, 2009
- Recorded: September 2008 – February 2009
- Studios: The Compound, Tigertown Studios
- Genres: Post-hardcore, screamo
- Length: 41:02
- Label: Tooth & Nail
- Producers: Aaron Sprinkle, Matt Carter

Emery chronology
| While Broken Hearts Prevail (2008) | ...In Shallow Seas We Sail (2009) | We Do What We Want (2010) |

Professional ratings
Review scores
| Source | Rating |
|---|---|
| AbsolutePunk | (84%) |
| AllMusic | 3/5 stars |
| Audio Addiction Magazine | 4/5 stars |
| Jesus Freak Hideout | 5/5 stars |
| Sputnikmusic | 5/5 stars |
| Under the Gun Review | (9/10) |
| Blogcritics | 4.5/5 stars |

...In Shallow Seas We Sail is the fourth studio album from post-hardcore band Emery that was released on June 2, 2009, through Tooth & Nail Records. The tracks "The Smile, The Face" and "Edge of the World" were previously released on Emery's 2008 EP, While Broken Hearts Prevail. The first track off of the record, "Cutthroat Collapse", was released as a digital download on April 7, 2009. The album debuted at number 50 on the Billboard 200. On June 20, 2009, the album hit number 1 on the Billboard Christian Albums chart.

== Track listing ==
| No. | Title | Length |
|---|---|---|
| 1. | "Cutthroat Collapse" | 3:24 |
| 2. | "Curbside Goodbye" | 4:05 |
| 3. | "Inside Our Skin" | 3:14 |
| 4. | "Churches and Serial Killers" | 2:55 |
| 5. | "Butcher's Mouth" | 3:14 |
| 6. | "In Shallow Seas We Sail" (Guest vocals by Aaron Sprinkle) | 3:38 |
| 7. | "The Poor and the Prevalent" | 3:05 |
| 8. | "The Smile, the Face" | 2:39 |
| 9. | "A Sin to Hold On To" | 2:50 |
| 10. | "Piggy Bank Lies" | 3:22 |
| 11. | "Edge of the World" | 3:52 |
| 12. | "Dear Death Part 1" | 1:41 |
| 13. | "Dear Death Part 2" | 3:06 |
| Total length: | | 41:02 |

Bonus tracks
| No. | Title | Length |
|---|---|---|
| 14. | "Closed Eyes, Open Hands" (iTunes bonus track and 7" single with "Cutthroat Collapse") | 3:12 |

== Personnel ==
Emery

- Toby Morell – co-lead vocals, bass
- Matt Carter – guitar, backing vocals
- Josh Head – keyboards, electronics, backing vocals
- Devin Shelton – co-lead vocals, bass
- Dave Powell – drums, percussion

Production

- Produced and recorded by Aaron Sprinkle and Matt Carter
- Recorded at The Compound and Tigertown Studios
- Tracks 1, 3 and 4 mixed by Dan Korneff at House of Loud
- Tracks 2 and 5 mixed by David Bendeth at House of Loud
- Tracks 6, 7, 9, 10 and 12 mixed by JR McNeely at Elm Studios South
- Tracks 8 and 11 mixed by David Bendeth and Dan Korneff at House of Loud
- Mastered by Troy Glessner at Spectre South
- Executive producer: Brandon Ebel

Art

- Art direction by Emery and Jordan Butcher
- Design by Jordan Butcher
- Illustrations by Marc Johns
- Photography by Dave Hill
