= Eve (Emery album) =

Seventh studio album by Emery

- Original cover

Studio album by Emery
- Released: November 9, 2018
- Genre: Post-hardcore; emo; alternative rock
- Length: 41:38
- Label: BadChristian
- Producer: Chris Keene; Matt Carter

Emery chronology
You Were Never Alone (2015)	Eve (2018)	White Line Fever (2020)

Professional ratings
Review scores
Source	Rating
Dead Press!	8/10 stars
Indie Vision Music	5/5
Jesus Freak Hideout	4/5 stars
Sound Link	8.5/10

Eve is the seventh studio album by American post-hardcore band Emery. The album was released on November 9, 2018, through the band's own label, BadChristian Music.

== Background ==
Emery launched an Indiegogo campaign on March 17, 2017, for the band's seventh studio album. The campaign had a finance goal of $50,000 and was met after just 36 hours. Backers were given an instant download of the Emery: Classics Reimagined EP, which features re-recorded versions of "So Cold I Can See My Breath", "As Your Voice Fades", and "The Smile, The Face".

== Controversy ==
The cover art, which features a naked woman with a bag over her head, caused some controversy due to the woman's buttocks being exposed. An edited version of the artwork was created by Jesus Freak Hideout.

The title for the song "2007 Clarksville High Volleyball State Champs Gay Is OK" also caused some controversy in the Christian music scene, with Trenton Worsham of Sound Link Magazine saying "when it comes to controversies or things to get people talking, it seems when a band aligned with a religious background and does something seemingly normal, the world loses their minds."

== Track listing ==
All tracks are written by Toby Morrell and Devin Shelton

No.	Title	Length
1.	"Is This the Real Life"	2:37
2.	"Fear Yourself"	2:04
3.	"Jesus Wept"	1:53
4.	"Safe"	4:05
5.	"Young Boy's Dream"	2:20
6.	"People Always Ask Me if We're Gonna Cuss in an Emery Song"	2:49
7.	"Streets of Gold"	3:27
8.	"Name Your God"	2:56
9.	"Flesh"	1:00
10.	"Bones"	0:42
11.	"Shame"	4:03
12.	"Everything That She Offered Me"	2:42
13.	"See You on the Other Side"	3:15
14.	"2007 Clarksville High Volleyball State Champs Gay Is OK"	4:03
15.	"Sins of Every Father"	3:41

== Personnel ==
Emery

- Toby Morrell – lead clean vocals, bass, screamed vocals
- Matt Carter – guitar, backing vocals, producer
- Josh Head – screamed vocals, keyboards, programming
- Devin Shelton – co-lead clean vocals
- Dave Powell – drums, percussion

Technical personnel

- Beau Burchell – mixing
- Matt Carter – producer, engineer
- Chris Keene – producer, engineer
- Troy Glessner – mastering
- John Maciel – editing, mixing assistant
- Christopher McKenney – photography
- Devin Shelton – art direction
- Alexander C. Sprungle – design, layout

== Charts ==
Chart (2018–19)	Peak position
US Billboard 200	137
US Top Alternative Albums (Billboard)	12
US Top Rock Albums (Billboard)	24
