= Vocal Few =

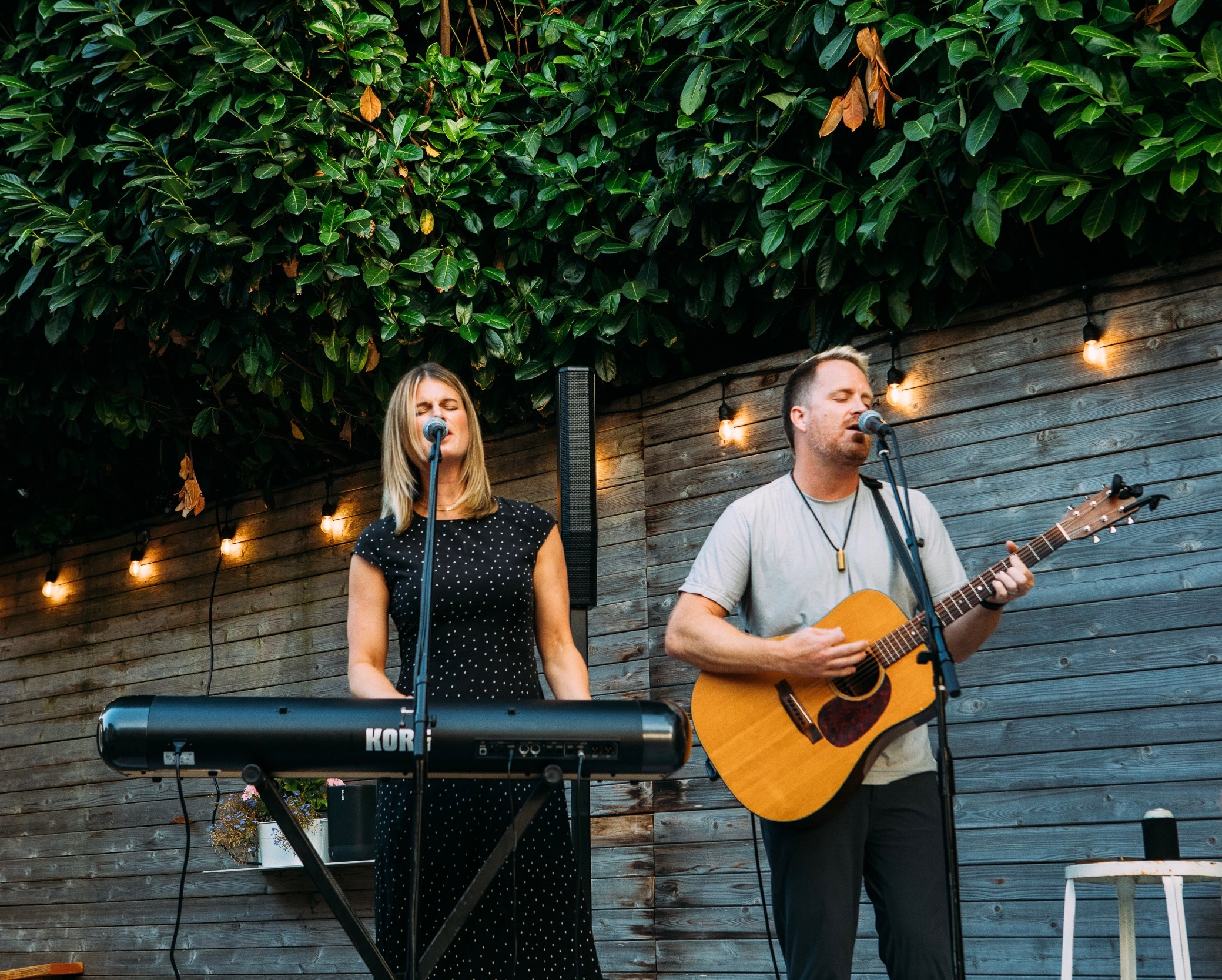

Background information
- Origin: Seattle, Washington
- Genres: Folk pop, indie folk
- Years active: 2011–present
- Label: Independent
- Spinoff of: The Classic Crime
- Members: Kristie MacDonald; Matt MacDonald
- Website: vocalfew.com

Vocal Few are an American folk pop husband and wife duo, consisting of Matt and Kristie MacDonald, from Seattle, Washington. Vocal Few, a side project to Matt MacDonald's band, The Classic Crime, began as a 'pre-baby bucket list' item for the couple before the birth of their first daughter, Praise MacDonald. Their first EP, She'll Be Right, was released in January 2012, one month after Praise was born. Their second EP, Tall Trees, was released in May 2013 shortly after finding out they were pregnant with their second daughter, Piper MacDonald. Their third EP, titled The Dream Alive was released on October 30, 2015.

== Background ==
Matt and Kristie met at summer camp when they were 15 and 16 years old. They began dating at 17 and 18 and eventually married at 21 and 22. Matt began playing music with The Classic Crime in 2003, and Matt and Kristie would eventually form Vocal Few in 2011 when Kristie became pregnant with their first child.

== Music history ==
Matt and Kristie formed Vocal Few in 2011, shortly after Matt's band, The Classic Crime, became independent. Their first EP, She'll Be Right, was released on January 10, 2012, independently. It landed on the Billboard magazine charts, where it placed at No. 8 on the Folk Albums chart and at No. 12 on the Heatseekers Albums chart. Their second EP, Tall Trees, was released on May 21, 2013. Their third EP, The Dream Alive, was released on October 30, 2015. Their first holiday release, "Snowdrift EP", is a collection of original winter songs and was released on November 30, 2016. While living in a family home in Nova Scotia in 2018, they wrote and recorded an album inspired by the home and town they were living in, and titled the album Grand Pre after the name of the rural Nova Scotia town that inspired it. For Valentines Day 2021 they released a cover of Joy Division's "Love will Tear us Apart". Their most recent single, "Doing it" is set to release on October 6, 2023.

== Members ==
- Kristie MacDonald (Keys/Vocals)
- Matt MacDonald (Guitar/Vocals)

== Discography ==
List of EPs, with selected chart positions
Title	Album details	Peak chart positions	
Title	Album details	US Folk	US Heat
She'll Be Right	Released: January 10, 2012; Label: Independent; digital download	8	12
Tall Trees	Released: May 21, 2013; Label: Independent; digital download		
The Dream Alive	Released: October 30, 2015; Label: Bad Christian; digital download	12	15
Snowdrift EP	Released: November 25, 2016; Label: Bad Christian; digital download		
Grand Pre	Released: August 17, 2018; Label: Independent; digital download		
Love Will Tear us Apart	Released: February 13th, 2021; Label: Independent; digital download		
She'll Be Right: 10 Year Anniversary Edition	Released: August 19th, 2022; Label: Independent; digital download		
Doing It	Released: October 6th, 2023; Label: Independent; digital download		
