= Made an America =

Album by Fever 333

EP by Fever 333
- Released: March 23, 2018
- Genre: Rapcore
- Length: 18:26
- Label: Roadrunner, 333 Wreckords Crew

Fever 333 chronology
Made an America (2018)	Strength in Numb333rs (2019)

Singles from Made an America
- 1. "Walking in My Shoes" Released: December 4, 2017; 2. "Made an America" Released: August 22, 2018

Made an America is the debut extended play (EP) by American rock band Fever 333. It was released on March 23, 2018, along with the announcement that the group signed to Roadrunner Records. The title track "Made an America" was nominated for Best Rock Performance at the 61st Annual Grammy Awards.

Professional ratings
Review scores
Source	Rating
DEADPRESS!	7/10 stars
The Sound Board	(7/10)
Rock 'N' Load	(9/10)
PureGrainAudio	(7/10)

== Track listing ==
Made an America – Standard edition
No.	Title	Writer(s)	Length
1.	"Made an America"	Jason Aalon Butler; John Feldmann; Travis Barker; Nick Furlong	2:53
2.	"We're Coming In"	Butler; Feldmann; Barker; Zakk Cervini; Benjamin Scheuer	2:16
3.	"(The First Stone) Changes" (featuring Yelawolf)	Butler; Feldmann; Barker; Bad Lucc; Cervini; Michael Wanye Atha	3:09
4.	"Hunting Season"	Butler; Feldmann; Barker; Allan P. Grigg; Cervini; Gerard Powell	2:38
5.	"Soul'd Me Out"	Butler; Feldmann; Barker; Simon Wilcox	2:45
6.	"Walking in My Shoes"	Butler; Feldmann; Barker; Cervini	2:51
7.	"POV"	Butler; Feldmann; Barker; Furlong	1:54
Total length:			18:26

Made an America – 12" vinyl bonus track
No.	Title	Length
8.	"Made an America" (remix) (featuring Vic Mensa and Travis Barker)	2:56
Total length:		21:22

Made an America – Japanese bonus tracks
No.	Title	Length
8.	"Made an America" (acoustic)	3:21
9.	"Walking in My Shoes" (acoustic)	3:10
Total length:		24:57
