= Rub Some Dirt on It =

Ninth studio album by Emery

- Original cover

Studio album by Emery
- Released: June 24, 2022
- Genres: Post-hardcore; emo; alternative rock
- Length: 42:44
- Label: Tooth & Nail Records
- Producers: Matt Carter; Chris Keene

Emery chronology
White Line Fever (2020)	Rub Some Dirt on It (2022)	Styrofoam (2026)

Professional ratings
Review scores
Source	Rating
Sputnik Music	4/5 stars

Rub Some Dirt on It is the ninth studio album by American post-hardcore band Emery. The album was released on June 24, 2022, through Tooth & Nail Records.

== Track listing ==
All tracks are written by Emery

No.	Title	Length
1.	"You Stole God from Me"	3:31
2.	"Concussion"	4:51
3.	"Enemy"	2:51
4.	"Said Enough"	3:52
5.	"Wizard"	4:04
6.	"I Don't Know You at All"	3:54
7.	"Don't Waste Your Breath"	3:19
8.	"Daniel, I'm Not Gonna Make It. Go Ahead Without Me"	4:00
9.	"Be Cool"	3:33
10.	"Stranger"	6:30
11.	"Lovely Lady"	2:19
Total length:		42:44

== Personnel ==
Emery

- Toby Morrell – co-lead vocals, bass, acoustic guitar
- Devin Shelton – co-lead vocals, bass
- Matt Carter – guitar, keyboards, backing vocals, producer
- Chris Keene – guitar, backing vocals, post production
- Josh Head – keyboards, electronics, screamed vocals, capture
- Dave Powell – drums

Additional

- Brennan Carter – trumpet
- Jameson Bratcher – trombone
- Jordan Valeriote – mixing
- Koby Nelson – mixing assistant
- Mike Kalajian – mastering
- Zac Schwiet – design
- Adam Skatula – A&R
