= Fever 333 =

American rock band

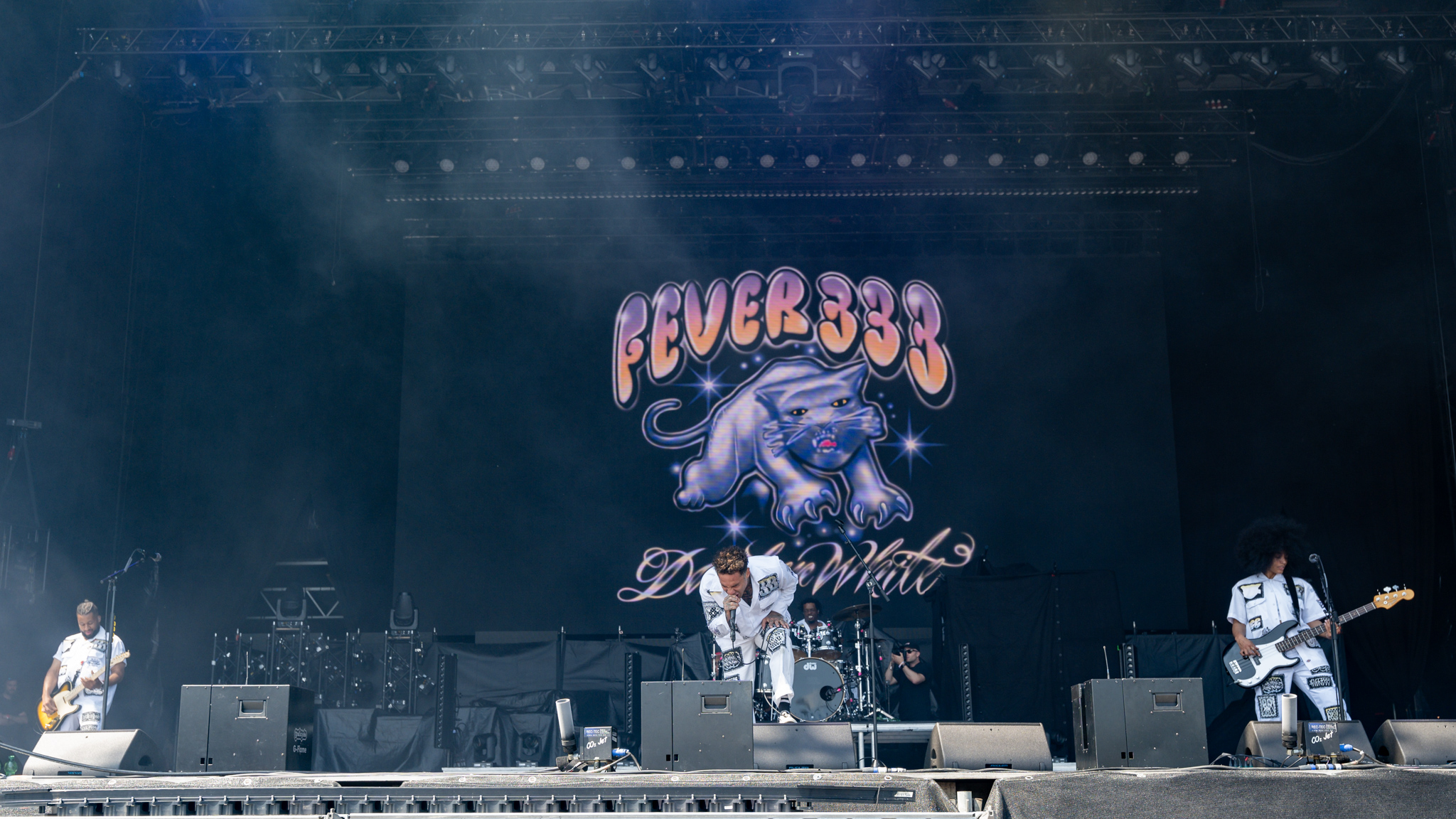
- Fever 333 performing at Rock im Park 2023

Background information
- Origin: Inglewood, California, U.S.
- Genres: Rap rock; hardcore punk; post-hardcore; rap metal; alternative metal
- Years active: 2017–present
- Labels: 333 Wreckords Crew; Roadrunner; Century Media
- Spinoffs: House of Protection
- Spinoff of: Letlive; the Chariot; Night Verses
- Members: Jason Aalon Butler; Brandon Davis; April Kae; Thomas Pridgen
- Past members: Stephen Harrison; Aric Improta
- Website: fever333.com

Fever 333 (or the Fever 333) is an American rock band formed in Inglewood, California, in 2017. The band was founded by former Letlive vocalist Jason Aalon Butler, former the Chariot guitarist Stephen Harrison and Night Verses drummer Aric Improta.

The band's debut extended play (EP), Made an America, was released on March 23, 2018. The group is signed to Roadrunner Records and 333 Wreckords. Their first LP Strength in Numb333rs was released a year later and its second EP Wrong Generation was released in 2020. Fever 333 released their second studio album, Darker White, on October 4, 2024.

== Career ==
=== 2017–2019: Formation, Made an America and Strength in Numb333rs ===
Prior to the disbandment of Letlive, Jason Aalon Butler had met Travis Barker by chance, and decided to spend Super Bowl Sunday with him and John Feldmann. The trio spent the day discussing hip hop and afro-punk, which developed into building a concept together of what Butler described as "something a little dangerous that was subservice: musically and in ethos". By the time Letlive had broken up, Butler got in contact with Stephen Harrison, whose band the Chariot had disbanded a few years prior. Butler and Harrison discussed black people's participation in rock music.

Fever 333 performed an impromptu pop-up show in a U-Haul truck in the parking lot of the bakery Randy's Donuts in Inglewood, California on July 4, 2017. The band performed three brand new unreleased tracks. Fever 333 members Jason Aalon Butler, Stephen Harrison, and Aric Improta hinted at the musical project and the show days prior to the midday performance. Butler posted a statement upon the announcement of the formation of Fever 333 in an Instagram post. "To those of you who want change, here is an offering to start that conversation. I've had a lot of people asking me what I'll be doing in the future—here is a taste of that." Butler continued, "I love art. I love being a musician. I love progress. And I am no stranger to pushing back if I feel it is necessary. This will be an exhibition of all the things I love w/ like minded people for whom I care deeply. To all the tired, frustrated, and brave, come join us." The band released its debut single, "We're Coming In", accompanied by a music video, which premiered on Alternative Press on August 25, 2017. On August 29, the band released another track, titled "Hunting Season", which features an uncredited guest appearance from Travis Barker. At the band's first headlining club show on August 31, 2017, and second concert overall, Blink-182 drummer Travis Barker made a surprise appearance performing on the song "Hunting Season" at The Roxy Theatre in West Hollywood. On November 3, 2017, the band released the song "Walking in My Shoes".

On March 23, 2018, Fever 333 released their debut extended play (EP), Made an America, without any prior announcement, on Roadrunner Records. Nathan Pike, Harrison's stepbrother and manager of 333 Wreckords, assisted with the US marketing efforts of the EP. On May 23, 2018, the band released a stand-alone single, "Trigger", regarding the topic of gun violence in the United States, accompanied by its music video. On September 28, 2018, the band released an official remix to their song "Made an America", featuring Barker and rapper Vic Mensa. A music video for the remix was also released on the band's official YouTube channel. Directed by Brandon Dermer, the black and white video sees vocalist Jason Butler performing in a warehouse, where he is joined by Mensa and Barker. In November 2018, the band was confirmed to serve as main support to Bring Me the Horizon on their United Kingdom and European arena tour later in the year.

On November 9, 2018, the band released the single "Burn It" along with announcing details of their debut album, Strength in Numb333rs, which was released on January 18, 2019. On December 7, 2018, the band received a Grammy nomination in Best Rock Performance for "Made an America". On May 29, 2019, they were featured on the song "Scary Mask", a single by Poppy. Its accompanying music video was directed by Titanic Sinclair. On November 3, 2019, the band released a new song called "Kingdom" on BBC Radio 1's Rock Show hosted by Daniel P. Carter. The song was released to stream the next day. On December 6, 2019, "Blow me", a single by The Used featuring the vocalist of Fever 333 Jason Aalon Butler is published.

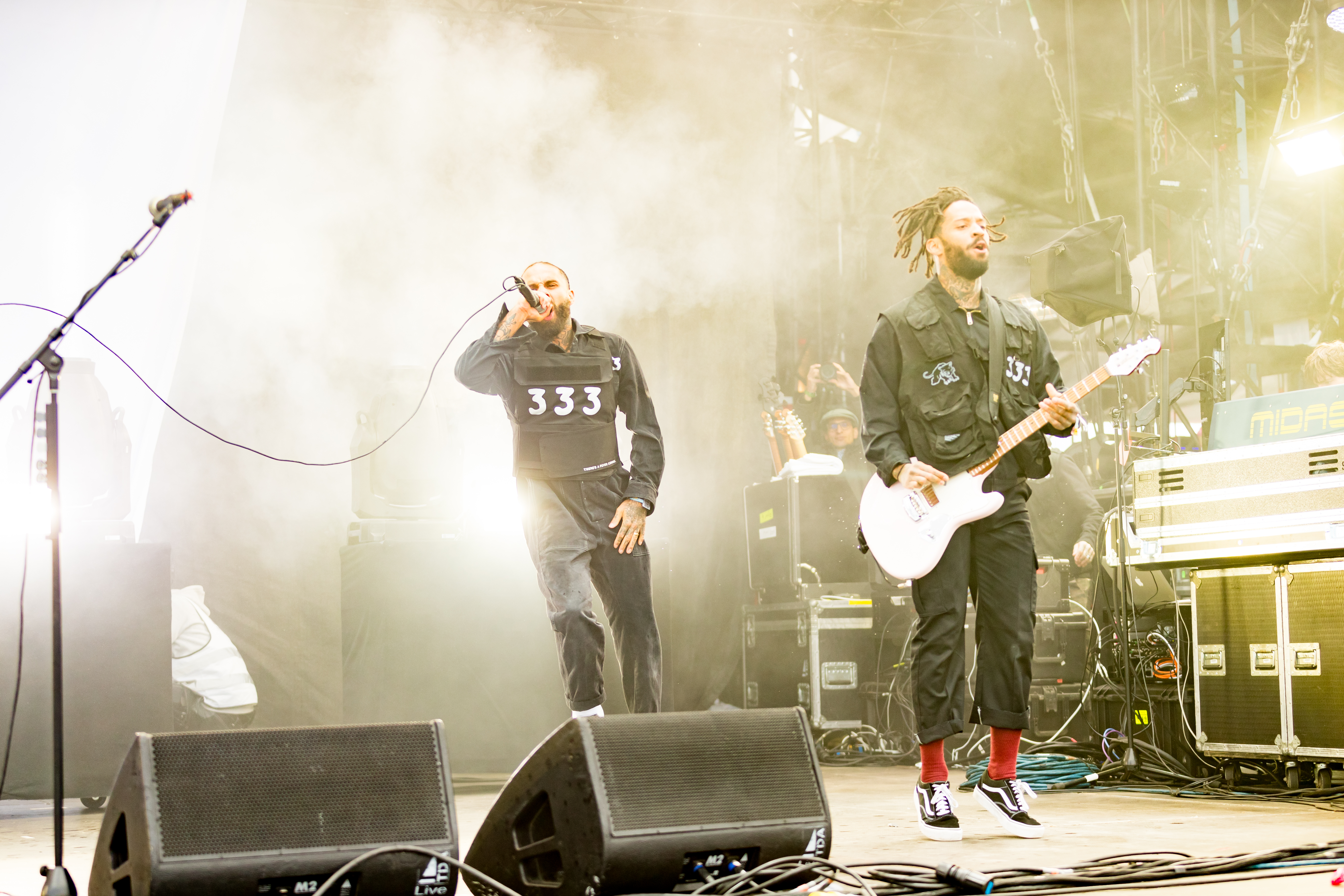
Fever 333 at Rock im Park 2019

=== 2020–present: Wrong Generation and departure of Harrison and Improta ===
Following the May 25, 2020 murder of George Floyd, the band released Long Live the Innocent on June 3, a live political demonstration and musical performance. Proceeds were donated to the Minnesota Freedom Fund and Black Lives Matter. During the performance they debuted the unreleased song "Supremacy", which was officially released on June 8.

Fever 333 released the single Bite Back on October 19, 2020. On October 23, 2020, Fever 333 released their second EP titled, Wrong Generation.

On October 3, 2022, drummer Improta and guitarist Harrison announced via separate Instagram posts that they would be leaving the band. Improta stated that the decision was "layered, but ultimately, I'd just rather dedicate my time to projects that operate different than that one." Harrison cited creative differences and that "things were pretty bad internally" as part of their reason for leaving. In April 2024, they would form a new band together, House of Protection.

On May 11, 2023, the band announced its new live lineup. Brandon Davis was announced as the new guitarist, April Kae as the new bassist and Thomas Pridgen as the new drummer. This made Fever 333 a quartet, and gave them a dedicated bass player for the first time.

Fever 333 released the single Hellfire on November 9, 2024 in collaboration with Riot Games for Arcane Season 2.

== Musical style ==
Their music merges elements of punk rock and hip hop, which Butler has described as both being "rooted in subversion", citing musical influences such as Rage Against the Machine, Public Enemy and Black Flag. Their lyrics tackle politically and socially conscious themes such as racism, sexism and homophobia. Their music has been categorised as rap rock, rapcore, rap metal, post-hardcore, hardcore punk, alternative metal, and nu metal. Some of their songs also feature elements of trap music, and subsequently been categorised as trap metal. In article for Afropunk Festival's website, Butler stated that he believes "Punk rock and hip-hop are one-in-the-same. They're always flying the flag of channeling art from discord", echoing a similar sentiment in an article for Colorado Springs Independent, by saying "[Fever 333's music is] like the evolution of guitar-based music. Because currently, hip-hop is really pushing the envelope sonically, as well as ideologically".

In a 2019 article for Kerrang!, writer Mischa Pearlman described their music as "a thrilling combination of post-hardcore and hip-hop with some of the catchiest melodies you'll hear on any album from this year". In an article for Altcorner.com, writer Elizabeth Birt described them as "a riotous punk act... [that] have solidified a sturdy brand of protest punk as they take aim at the wrongs in the world but particularly in their homeland of America, not through violence but through angst-filled lyrics".

== Political views and activism ==
The band espouse radical left-wing political views, in opposition to social inequality, capitalism and authoritarianism in both their lyrics and activism. The "333" in their name represents the three core principles that the members view the band to stand for: community, charity and change. In 2019 interview for Guestlist.net, Butler stated:

Essentially it's the foundation upon which the whole project rests. Change is the overarching theme, right? Something that we can talk about and all we want. But I think action and actual participation in the change you want to see is most important. So for us, the charity contingent is a very large contingent piece of the project and everything we do from playing these demonstrations tonight to merchandise to album sales there is a percentage of that, that goes to the Walk In My Shoes Foundation. A brand fund non-profit that I started that aligns with various charities. It gives you a choice online to choose which one you think you align best with. When we are playing these headline demonstrations we find a way to pair with local charities and local organizations in order to offer them a thank you for allowing us space and the time to share the community with us. That is how those all play into each other and form the idea that is Fever 333.

They are heavily inspired by the anti-racist, anti-imperialist and anti-fascist views of the Black Panther Party in addition to political activists such as Mahatma Gandhi, Angela Davis, James Baldwin and Ta-Nehisi Coates. In a 2019 interview for Kerrang!, Butler stated that they perceive that "[they are] speaking with the people, not for them".

They have also expressed disdain for the American electoral system, with Butler specifically stating that he doesn't believe the majority of politicians to stand for the betterment of the people in general, with voters generally only considered the effects their vote would have on themselves and disregarding those often less fortunate than them.

The group perceive their status as a band provides them with a platform to support to project their views to a wider audience and combat social injustice, citing that they are "trying to write the soundtrack to the revolution that we know is about to happen". In an article for Kerrang!, Butler said that:

Music and art have served as the catalyst for socially inclined movements for as long as we can remember, but for some reason, at a time where we are now granted the ability to see how deeply flawed our system is, we have slowed the charge for change. FEVER 333 has dedicated its entire platform to that change from its inception with its music, activism, even its own charity fund that sees a percentage of proceeds funnelled from all profits the project receives. This is not a marketing method, this is a tool for change. Please consider widening this message for the people with FEVER 333 by joining us in this effort.

=== Long Live the Innocent ===
Long Live the Innocent was a live streamed demonstration and performance by the band on June 3, 2020. It was a response to the murder of George Floyd by police on May 25 of the same year and represented the band's condemnation of both his specific killers, as well as police brutality and institutional racism in general. All proceeds were donated to the Minnesota Freedom Fund and Black Lives Matter. NME described the event a representation of solidarity with the communities also protesting Floyd's murder. In one speech that Butler gave during the event, he stated that:

For years we've been fighting, due to ideals, constructs known as 'race', and the fear of each other. Right now in America, there is a fire that is being stoked, flames that are being fanned by people in power. The people are relinquishing their power – the very power that we possess, simply by existing, as a people, as a nation, as a constituency. We are giving up our power to someone, and to people, and to a system, that does not care about us – not the way it cares about itself. I don't care where you sit on this spectrum: if you're able to watch the atrocities that are happening every single day – much like our brother George Floyd being slain on the streets in front of a camera – and you don't think that there's a problem, then you are that fucking problem.

Butler also criticised a number of high-profile record labels and streaming services, including Atlantic Records, Sony Music, Spotify, Def Jam Recordings, Amazon and Apple Music, for not using their money to support the black community during this time, despite profiting off of black culture and music.

== Imagery ==
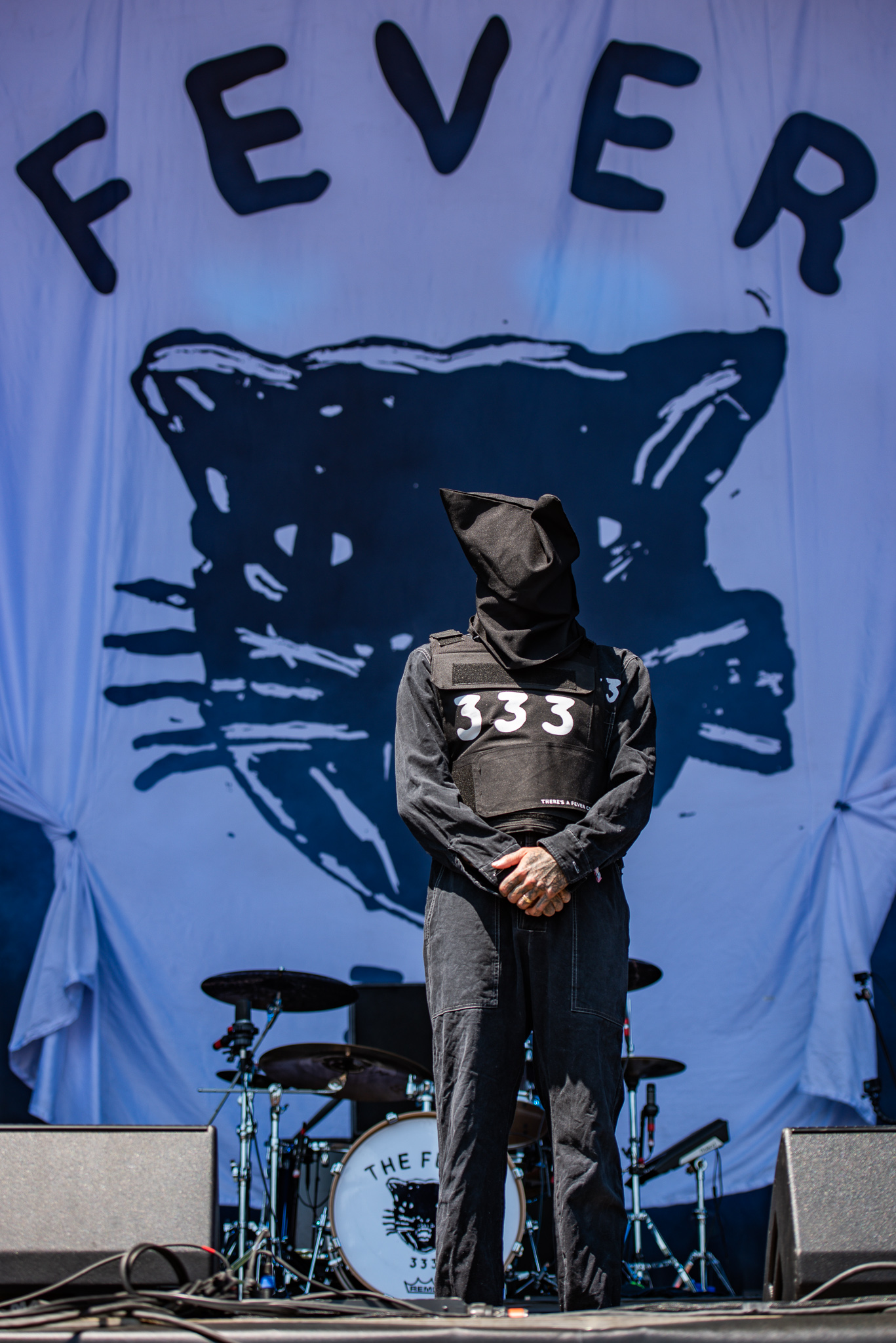
The band performing in front of a backdrop with their logo printed on

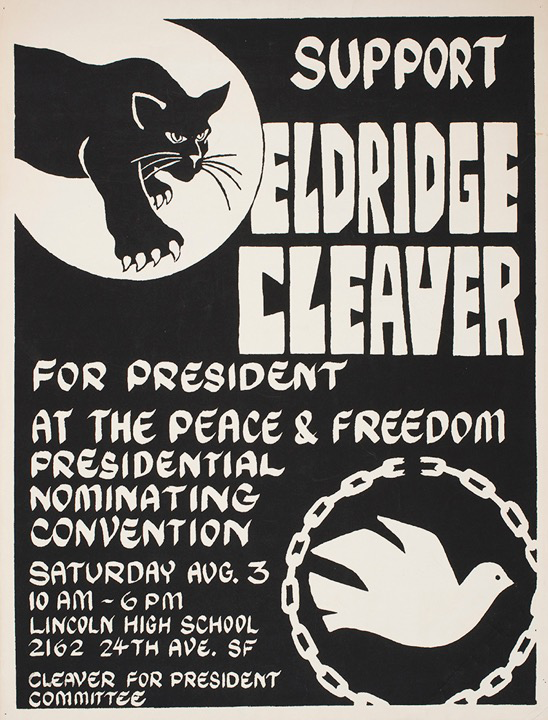
A poster supporting the Black Panther Party candidate Eldridge Cleaver

The band's logo is a homage to the logo for the Black Panther Party

The band's logo is a homage to the logo of the Black Panther Party, an American anti-racism and revolutionary socialist organisation that Butler has likened the band's practices to, as "black panthers do not strike unless they are pushed into a corner to where they have no way out". The homage was approved by the designer of the Black Panther's logo and their Minister of Culture Emory Douglas.

While performing live, Butler often wears a bulletproof vest with "333" across its chest. According to an article by Kerrang!, this is intended to represent the American police force's increasing militarisation. Butler also often performs in a boilersuit, also featuring the groups iconography, along with a bag over his head, representing the human rights abuses in prisons such as Guantanamo Bay detention camp and Abu Ghraib prison.

== Band members ==
Current members

- Jason Aalon Butler – lead vocals, guitars, bass, percussion (2017–present)
- Brandon Davis – guitars (2023–present)
- April Kae – bass, backing vocals (2023–present)
- Thomas Pridgen – drums, percussion (2023–present)

Former members

- Stephen Harrison – guitars, backing vocals, bass, percussion (2017–2022)
- Aric Improta – drums, percussion (2017–2022)
Fever 333 at Rock im Park 2023

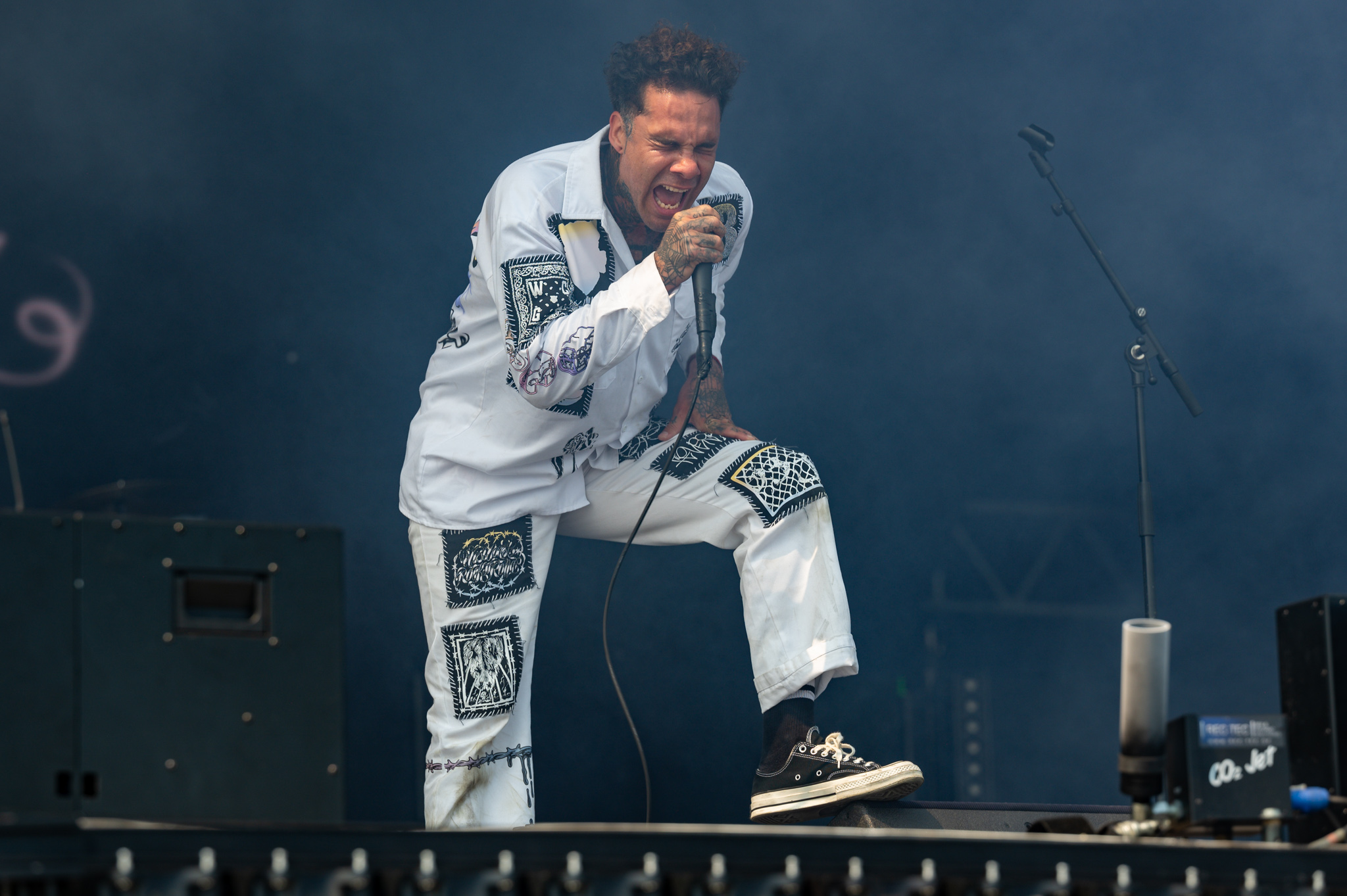
Jason Aalon Butler

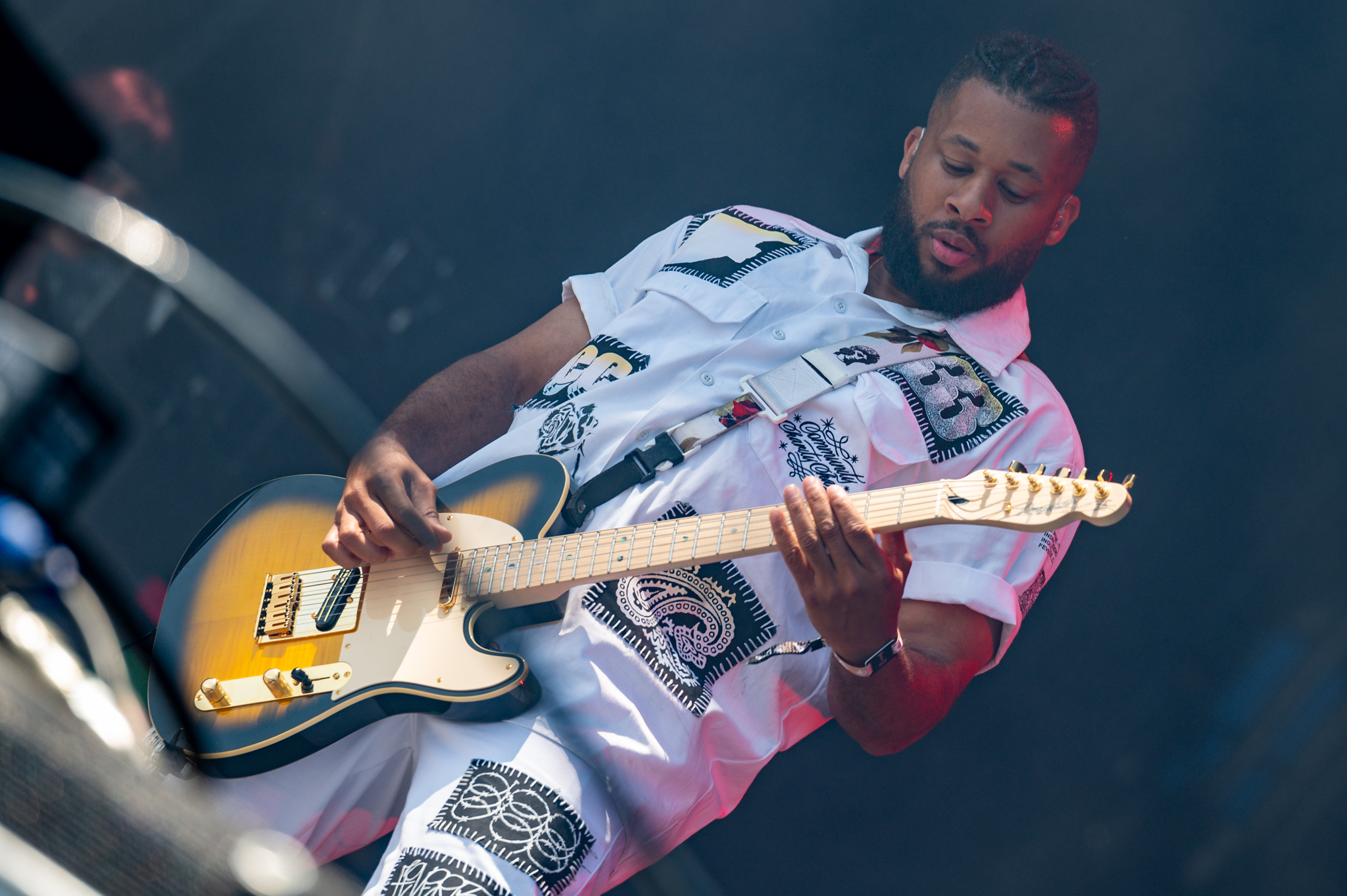
Brandon Davis

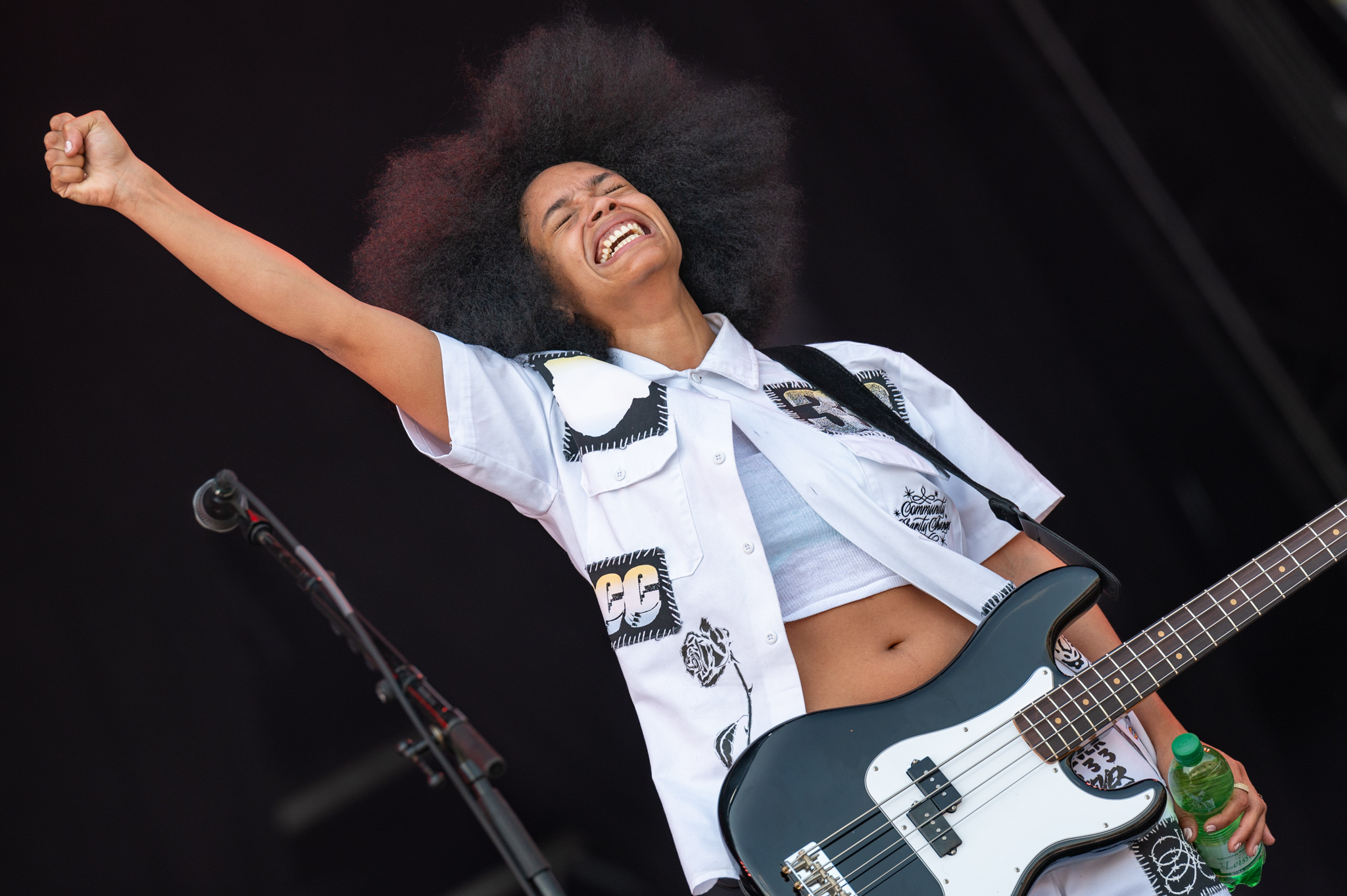
April Kae

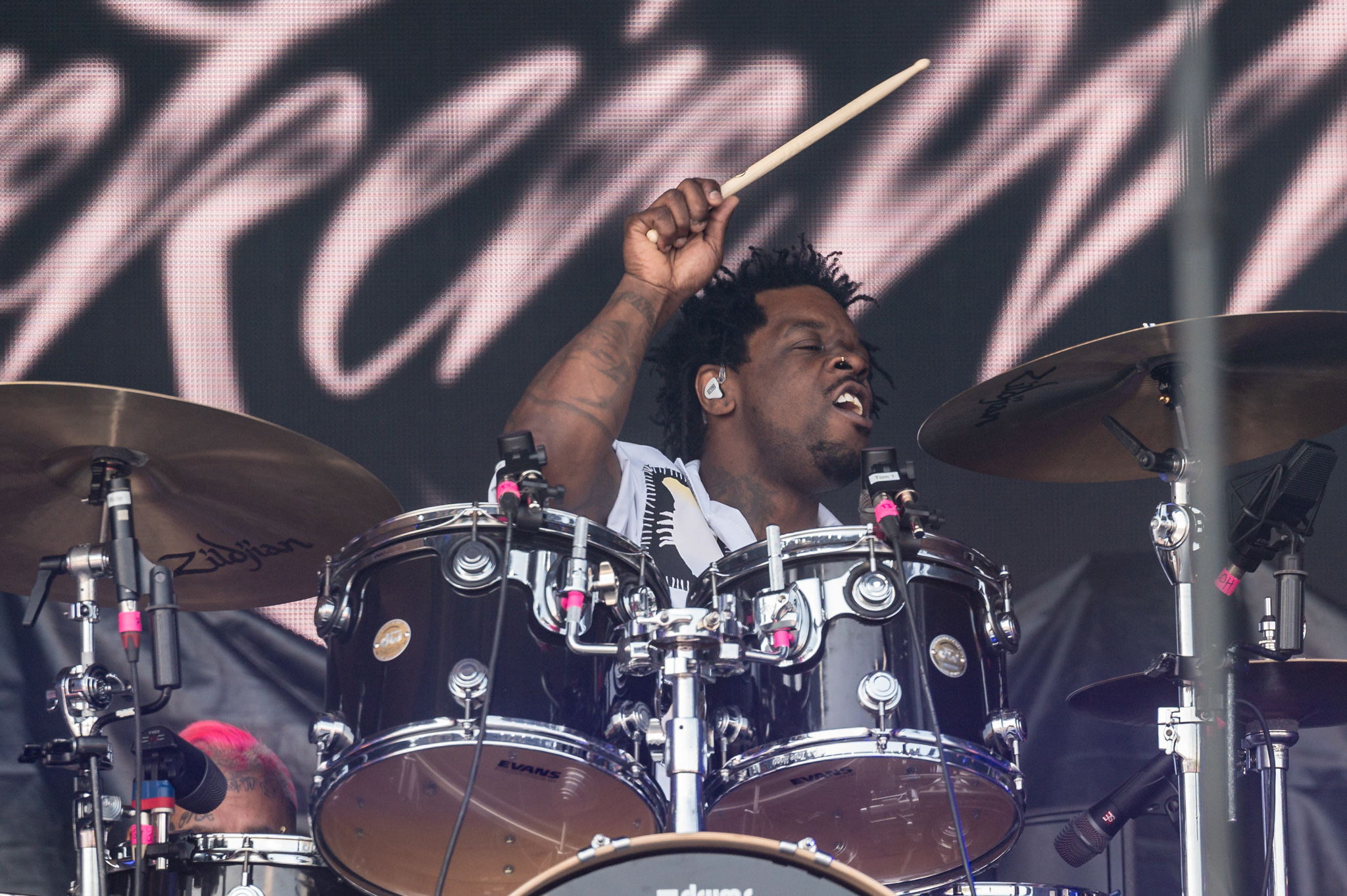
Thomas Pridgen

Timeline

== Discography ==
Studio albums

- Strength in Numb333rs (2019)
- Darker White (2024)

== Accolades ==
Grammy Awards

Year	Nominee / work	Award	Result
2019	"Made an America"	Best Rock Performance	Nominated

Kerrang! Awards

Year	Nominee / work	Award	Result
2019	"Burn It"	Best Song	Won
