= Strength in Numb333rs =

2019 studio album by Fever 333

Studio album by Fever 333
- Released: January 18, 2019
- Genres: Nu metal; rap metal; trap metal
- Length: 41:00
- Labels: Roadrunner; 333 Wreckords Crew
- Producers: John Feldmann; Travis Barker

Fever 333 chronology
Made an America (2018)	Strength in Numb333rs (2019)	Wrong Generation (2020)

Singles from Strength in Numb333rs
- 1. "Burn It" Released: November 9, 2018; 2. "One of Us" Released: February 24, 2019

Strength in Numb333rs is the debut studio album by American rock band Fever 333, released on January 18, 2019.

== History ==
On November 9, 2018, the band released a music video for their new single "Burn It" along with announcing their debut album, Strength in Numb333rs, with a release date of January 18, 2019.

== Reception ==
Professional ratings
Review scores
Source	Rating
Cryptic Rock	4.5/5 stars
Kerrang!	4/5 stars
Metal Hammer	4/5 stars
New Noise	4.5/5 stars
Vulture Hound	5/5
Upset	5/5 stars
Wall of Sound	9/10

Strength in Numb333rs received critical acclaim upon release. Wall of Sound gave the album a rating of 9/10 and wrote: "Strength in Numb333rs won't change the landscape for music in 2019 but it may well shape a generation to make better decisions". It was also voted the "Best Album of 2019" by the subscribers to online publication 91 Suns. Loudwire named it one of the 50 best rock albums of 2019.

== Track listing ==
Strength in Numb333rs – Standard edition
No.	Title	Writer(s)	Length
1.	"..."	Jason Aalon Butler; John Feldmann; Travis Barker	1:02
2.	"Burn It"	Butler; Feldmann; Barker; Nick Furlong; Zakk Cervini; Matt Pauling	3:51
3.	"Animal"	Butler; Feldmann; Barker; Aaron Jennings; Cervini	3:23
4.	"Prey for Me/3"	Butler; Feldmann; Barker; Josh Dun; Cervini; Matt Malpass	5:11
5.	"One of Us"	Butler; Feldmann; Barker; Simon Wilcox; Cervini	3:24
6.	"Inglewood/3"	Butler; Feldmann; Barker; Wilcox; Malpass	7:01
7.	"The Innocent"	Butler; Feldmann; Barker	3:21
8.	"Out of Control/3"	Butler; Feldmann; Barker; Malpass	7:09
9.	"Am I Here?"	Butler; Feldmann; Barker	2:48
10.	"Coup D'Étalk"	Butler; Feldmann; Barker	4:00
Total length:			41:00

Strength in Numb333rs – Japanese bonus tracks
No.	Title	Writer(s)	Length
11.	"Trigger"	Butler; Feldmann; Barker; Furlong	2:46
12.	"Vandals"	Butler; Feldmann; Barker; Cervini	2:59
Total length:			46:45

Strength in Numb333rs – Japanese tour edition bonus tracks
No.	Title	Writer(s)	Length
13.	"Kingdom"	Butler; Feldmann; Barker; Gabe Simon	3:28
14.	"One of Us" (Goldhouse r333mix)		3:02
15.	"The Innocent" (live from Woodstock)		4:00
16.	"We're Coming In" (live from Woodstock)	Butler; Feldmann; Barker; Cervini; Benjamin Scheuer	3:32
Total length:			61:47

Notes

- All tracks are stylized in all caps.

== Personnel ==
Fever 333

- Jason Aalon Butler – lead vocals, guitars, bass, percussion, lyrics
- Stephen Harrison – guitars, backing vocals
- Aric Improta – drums

Additional

- John Feldmann – guitars, bass, production, writing
- Travis Barker – drums, drum programming, production, writing
- Zakk Cervini – guitars, bass, engineering, mixing, writing
- Matt Pauling – guitars, bass, engineering, writing
- Chris Athens – mastering
- Neal Avron – mixing
- Jon Lundin – engineering
- Matt Malpass – engineering
- Nik Tretiakov – engineering
- Nick Furlong – writing
- Simon Wilcox – additional vocals
- Jayden Allen – additional vocals
- Milla Feldmann – additional vocals
- Emi Allen – additional vocals

== Charts ==
Chart (2019)	Peak position
Australian Digital Albums (ARIA)	38
Belgian Albums (Ultratop Flanders)	156
German Albums (Offizielle Top 100)	73
Scottish Albums (Official Charts)	90
Swiss Albums (Schweizer Hitparade)	75
UK Rock & Metal Albums (Official Charts)	3
