= The Weak's End =

- Cover for the re-release

Studio album by Emery
- Released: January 15, 2004; January 27, 2004 (re-release)
- Recorded: 2003
- Genres: Post-hardcore, emo
- Length: 40:55
- Label: Tooth & Nail
- Producer: Ed Rose

Emery chronology
The Columbus EEP Thee (2002)	The Weak's End (2004)	The Question (2005)

Professional ratings
Review scores
Source	Rating
AllMusic	2.5/5 stars
Jesus Freak Hideout	3.5/5 stars
Punk News	2.5/5 stars

The Weak's End is the debut studio album by American post-hardcore band Emery. The original release was released on January 15, 2004, with the re-issued version released on January 27, 2004. Most of the albums available are labeled the re-released version (which includes the cover of the broken fishbowl as shown), in which the title of track 6 is changed. Although the two albums look different, the actual songs themselves are very similar.

== Track listing ==
All tracks are written by Emery.

No.	Title	Length
1.	"Walls"	3:23
2.	"The Ponytail Parades"	4:05
3.	"Disguising Mistakes with Goodbyes"	3:20
4.	"By All Accounts (Today Was a Disaster)"	4:06
5.	"Fractions"	5:14
6.	"The Note from Which a Chord Is Built"	2:28
7.	"Bloodless"	4:22
8.	"Under Serious Attack"	3:47
9.	"As Your Voice Fades"	4:02
10.	"The Secret"	5:56
Total length:		40:55

== Personnel ==
Band

- Toby Morrell — lead clean vocals & unclean vocals, acoustic guitar
- Devin Shelton — co-lead clean vocals, rhythm guitar
- Josh Head — unclean vocals, keyboards
- Matt Carter — lead guitar
- Joel "Chopper" Green — bass
- Seth "Beef" Studley — drums

Production

- Jon Dunn — A&R
- Emery — mixing (tracks 4, 6, 10)
- Troy Glessner — mastering, additional tracking
- Zach Hodges — mixing (track 6)
- Kris McCaddon — photography
- J.R. McNeely — mixing (tracks 1–3, 5, 7–9)
- Ed Rose — engineer, producer

== The Weak's End - Live Version (2021) ==
On September 27, 2021, the live album titled The Weak's End (Live Version) was released for streaming services via BC Music.
