= Nicholas Furlong discography =

American discography

This is the full discography of American songwriter and record producer Nicholas Furlong, also known as RAS.

== Discography ==
=== Singles ===
==== As The Dirty Rich ====
Year	Title	Album	Credit
2020	"Hot American Summer"	Hot American Summer – Single	Vocals, songwriter, producer, all instruments

==== As featured vocalist ====
Year	Artist	Title	Album	Credits
2015	Avicii	"The Nights"	The Days / Nights EP - Stories (UK and Japan Versions)	Vocals, songwriter, producer
2013	Steve Aoki	"Bring You To Life (Transcend)"	Bring You To Life (Transcend) – Single	Vocals, songwriter

=== Production and songwriting credits ===
Year	Artist	Title	Album	Credits
2021	Atreyu	TBA	TBA	Songwriter
2021	Betcha	TBA	TBA	Songwriter, producer
2021	Devin Dawson	”Not On My Watch”	The Pink Slip – EP	Songwriter
2021	The Dirty Heads	TBA	TBA	Producer
2021	Fever 333	TBA	TBA	Songwriter, producer
2021	Forester	TBA	TBA	Songwriter
2021	guardin	"all i can see"	all i can see - single	Songwriter, producer
2021	Jesse Clegg	TBA	TBA	Songwriter, producer
2021	Papa Roach	TBA	TBA	Executive producer (album), songwriter, producer
2021	Parson James	TBA	TBA	Songwriter, producer
2020	Betcha	”July”	July – Single	Songwriter, producer
2020	Felly	"Love and Fear"	Mariposa	Songwriter, producer
2020	Fever 333	”Supremacy”	Wrong Generation	Songwriter, producer
2020	Hogland	"Scars" (feat. Wiktoria)	Scars - Single	Songwriter, producer
2020	The Hunna	"Cover You" (feat. Travis Barker)	I'd Rather Die Than Let You In	Songwriter
2020	Jesse Clegg	"Speed of Light"	Speed of Light - Single	Songwriter, producer
2020	Kygo	"Say You Will" (feat. Patrick Droney and Petey)	Golden Hour	Songwriter
2020	Kygo	"Someday" (feat. Zac Brown)	Golden Hour	Songwriter, producer
2020	No Love For The Middle Child	”Walk Away” (feat. American Teeth)	Walk Away - EP	Songwriter
2020	Stray Kids	"We Go" (feat. Bang Chan, Changbin, & HAN)	In Life (Repackage)	Songwriter
2020	Yung Pinch	"Hanging With Ghosts" (feat. Goody Grace & Good Charlotte)	Back 2 The Beach	Songwriter, producer
2019	311	"Space and Time"	Voyager	Songwriter
2019	311	"What The?!"	Voyager	Songwriter
2019	311	"Dodging Raindrops"	Voyager	Songwriter
2019	311	"Lucid Dreams"	Voyager	Songwriter
2019	Dinosaur Pile-Up	"Pouring Gasoline"	Celebrity Mansions	Songwriter
2019	Fever 333	"Burn It"	Strength in Numb333rs	Songwriter
2019	Hero The Band	"Trouble in My Mind"	Back To Myself – EP	Songwriter, producer
2019	New Politics	"Suspension”	An Invitation to an Alternate Reality	Songwriter
2019	Papa Roach	"The Ending"	Who Do You Trust?	Executive producer (album), songwriter, producer
2019	Papa Roach	"Renegade Music"	Who Do You Trust?	Executive producer (album), songwriter, producer
2019	Papa Roach	"Not The Only One"	Who Do You Trust?	Executive producer (album), songwriter, producer
2019	Papa Roach	"Who Do You Trust?"	Who Do You Trust?	Executive producer (album), songwriter, producer
2019	Papa Roach	"Elevate"	Who Do You Trust?	Executive producer (album), songwriter, producer
2019	Papa Roach	"Come Around"	Who Do You Trust?	Executive producer (album), songwriter, producer
2019	Papa Roach	"Feel Like Home"	Who Do You Trust?	Executive producer (album), songwriter, producer
2019	Papa Roach	"Problems"	Who Do You Trust?	Executive producer (album), songwriter, producer
2019	Papa Roach	"I Suffer Well"	Who Do You Trust?	Executive producer (album), songwriter, producer
2019	Papa Roach	"Maniac"	Who Do You Trust?	Executive producer (album), songwriter, producer
2019	Papa Roach	"Better Than Life"	Who Do You Trust?	Executive producer (album), songwriter, producer
2019	Stray Kids	"Double Knot"	Clé: Levanter	Songwriter
2019	Stray Kids	"Double Knot" (Japanese Version)	SKZ2020	Songwriter
2019	The Used	"Blow Me" (feat. Jason Aalon Butler)	Heartwork	Songwriter
2018	Basement	"Slip Away"	Beside Myself	Songwriter, producer
2018	Fever 333	"Made An America"	Made An America	Songwriter
2018	Fever 333	"POV"	Made An America	Songwriter
2018	Fever 333	"Made An America (Remix)" (feat. Travis Barker & Vic Mensa)		Songwriter
2018	Logan Henderson	"Pull Me Deep"	Pull Me Deep – Single	Songwriter
2018	Logan Henderson	"Intro"	Echoes of Departure and The Endless Street of Dreams Pt. I	Executive producer (album), songwriter, producer
2018	Logan Henderson	"Sleepwalker"	Echoes of Departure and The Endless Street of Dreams Pt. I	Executive producer (album), songwriter, producer
2018	Logan Henderson	"Bite My Tongue"	Echoes of Departure and The Endless Street of Dreams Pt. I	Executive producer (album), songwriter, producer
2018	Logan Henderson	"Speak of The Devil"	Echoes of Departure and The Endless Street of Dreams Pt. I	Executive producer (album), songwriter, producer
2018	Logan Henderson	"Take It Out On Me"	Echoes of Departure and The Endless Street of Dreams Pt. I	Executive producer (album), songwriter, producer
2018	Logan Henderson	"Evergreen"	Echoes of Departure and The Endless Street of Dreams Pt. I	Executive producer (album), songwriter, producer
2018	Logan Henderson	"Generations"	Echoes of Departure and The Endless Street of Dreams Pt. I	Executive producer (album), songwriter, producer
2017	All Time Low	"Dirty Laundry"	Last Young Renegade	Songwriter, producer
2017	All Time Low	"Nice2KnoU"	Last Young Renegade	Songwriter, producer
2017	All Time Low	"Nightmares"	Last Young Renegade	Songwriter, producer
2017	All Time Low	"Afterglow"	Last Young Renegade	Songwriter, producer
2017	blink-182	"Good Old Days"	California (Deluxe Edition)	Songwriter
2017	The Front Bottoms	"You Used To Say (Holy Fuck)"	Going Grey	Songwriter, producer
2017	The Front Bottoms	"Peace Sign"	Going Grey	Songwriter, producer
2017	The Front Bottoms	"Vacation Town"	Going Grey	Songwriter, producer
2017	The Front Bottoms	"Grand Finale"	Going Grey	Songwriter, producer
2017	The Front Bottoms	"Trampoline"	Going Grey	Songwriter, producer
2017	The Front Bottoms	"Far Drive"	Going Grey	Songwriter, producer
2017	The Front Bottoms	"Everyone But You"	Going Grey	Songwriter, producer
2017	The Front Bottoms	"Ocean"	Going Grey	Songwriter, producer
2017	Krewella	"Dead AF"	—	Songwriter, producer
2017	Onyx	"Problem Child"	Silicon Valley: The Soundtrack	Songwriter, producer
2017	Papa Roach	"Break The Fall"	Crooked Teeth	Executive producer (album), songwriter, producer
2017	Papa Roach	"Crooked Teeth"	Crooked Teeth	Executive producer (album), songwriter, producer
2017	Papa Roach	"My Medication"	Crooked Teeth	Executive producer (album), songwriter, producer
2017	Papa Roach	"American Dreams"	Crooked Teeth	Executive producer (album), songwriter, producer
2017	Papa Roach	"Periscope" (feat. Skylar Grey)	Crooked Teeth	Executive producer (album), songwriter, producer
2017	Papa Roach	"Help"	Crooked Teeth	Executive producer (album), songwriter, producer
2017	Papa Roach	"Sunrise Trailer Park" (feat. Machine Gun Kelly)	Crooked Teeth	Executive producer (album), songwriter, producer
2017	Papa Roach	"Traumatic	Crooked Teeth	Executive producer (album), songwriter, producer
2017	Papa Roach	"None of The Above"	Crooked Teeth	Executive producer (album), songwriter, producer
2016	Krewella	"Marching On"	Ammunition EP	Songwriter
2016	Steve Aoki	"Back 2 U" (feat. WALK THE MOON)	Back 2 U – Single	Songwriter, producer
2016	Steve Aoki	"Can't Go Home" (feat. Adam Lambert)	Can't Go Home – Single	Vocal producer
2016	Steve Aoki	"Feel (The Power of Now)"	Feel (The Power of Now) – Single	Songwriter
2015	All Time Low	"Runaways"	Future Hearts	Songwriter
2015	All Time Low	"Don't You Go"	Future Hearts	Songwriter
2015	Good Charlotte	"Makeshift Love"	Youth Authority	Songwriter
2015	Jake Miller	"Selfish Girls"	Rumors	Songwriter
2015	ListenBee	"Save Me"	Save Me – Single	Songwriter
2015	ONE OK ROCK	"Paper Planes" (feat. Kellin Quinn)	35XXXV	Songwriter
2015	Sleeping With Sirens	"Kick Me"	Madness	Songwriter
2015	Sleeping With Sirens	"Better Off Dead"	Madness	Songwriter
2015	Sleeping With Sirens	"November"	Madness	Songwriter
2015	Steve Aoki	"Light Years" (feat. Rivers Cuomo)	Neon Future II	Songwriter, additional vocals
2015	Timeflies	"Burn It Down"	Just For Fun	Songwriter
2015	Waka Flocka Flame	"Game On" (feat. Good Charlotte)	Pixels (Motion Picture Soundtrack)	Songwriter, producer
2014	Heffron Drive	"Could You Be Home" (RAS Remix)	Happy Mistakes	Producer
2014	Issues	"Disappear"	Diamond Dreams	Producer
2014	5 Seconds of Summer	"Everything I Didn't Say"	5 Seconds of Summer	Songwriter
2014	5 Seconds of Summer	"Social Casualty"	5 Seconds of Summer	Songwriter
2014	5 Seconds of Summer	"Independence Day"	5 Seconds of Summer	Songwriter
2013	Makua Rothman	"Underneath The Halo"	Sound Wave	Songwriter
2013	Makua Rothman	"The Nite B4"	Sound Wave	Songwriter
2013	Kay	"Next To You"	My Name Is Kay	Songwriter, producer
2013	Kay	"It's Over"	My Name Is Kay	Songwriter, producer
2012	Diplo	"No Problem" (feat. Flinch and Kay)	Express Yourself EP	Songwriter
2012	Steve Aoki	"Singularity" (feat. Kay)	It's The End of The World As We Know It EP	Songwriter, vocal producer
2011	Big Time Rush	"Time of Our Life"	Elevate	Songwriter
2011	Stan Walker	"Won't Let You Down"	Let The Music Play	Songwriter, producer
2011	The Wanted	"Satellite"	The Wanted	Vocal producer
2010	Big Time Rush	"Count On You" (feat. Jordin Sparks)	BTR	Songwriter
2010	Burnham	"Automatic"	Almost Famous – EP	Co-writer
2010	Chingy	"Superhero"	Superhero – Single	Songwriter, vocals
2010	Colbie Caillat	"Brighter Than The Sun"	All of You	Vocal producer
2010	Jordin Sparks	"I Am Woman"	I Am Woman – Single	Vocal producer
2010	Jordin Sparks	"The World I Knew"	African Cats (Motion Picture Soundtrack)	Vocal producer
2010	Justice Crew	"And Then We Dance"	And Then We Dance – Single	Songwriter, producer
2010	Murphy Lee	"Hit The Floor" (feat. Nelly, City Spud, Kyjuan & Ali)	You See Me	Songwriter, lead vocals
