= No Apologies (Papa Roach song) =

2022 single by Papa Roach

Single by Papa Roach

from the album Ego Trip
- Released: 4 April 2022
- Length: 3:08
- Label: New Noize Records; Warner Music
- Songwriters: Jacoby Shaddix; Tobin Esperance; Anthony Esperance; Jerry Horton; Colin Brittain; Nick Furlong
- Producers: Papa Roach; Brittain; Furlong

Papa Roach singles chronology
"Cut the Line" (2022)	"No Apologies" (2022)	"Leave a Light On (Talk Away the Dark)" (2022)

"No Apologies (acoustic)" single artwork

Music video
- "No Apologies" on YouTube

"No Apologies" is a song by American rock band Papa Roach. It is the fourth single and twelfth track from their eleventh album Ego Trip. It reached No. 1 on the Billboard Mainstream Rock Airplay chart in September 2022.

== Background and release ==
Jacoby Shaddix has said that the song is about forgiveness. He said it was written as a letter to his biological father, and that holding onto anger and resentment weighed him down. Shaddix later said that forgiving his father took time and was not a straightforward process.

The music video was released in 2022. The song was released as downloadable content for the video game Rock Band 4 in 2023.

== Reception ==
Clash described the song as a stand-out nostalgia tune and an emo-tinged banger. Sputnikmusic described the song as generic, but said it was a decent showcase for Shaddix's vocals.

== Track listing ==
"No Apologies (acoustic)" single
No.	Title	Length
1.	"No Apologies" (acoustic)	3:04
2.	"No Apologies"	3:08
Total length:		6:12

== Personnel ==
Credits adapted from Apple Music.

Papa Roach

- Jacoby Shaddix – vocals
- Tobin Esperance – bass
- Anthony Esperance – guitar
- Jerry Horton – guitar
- Tony Palermo – drums

Additional personnel

- Erica Silva – background vocals

Production and engineering

- Colin Brittain – producer, mixing engineer
- Nick Furlong – producer
- Papa Roach – producer
- Chris Athens – mastering engineer
- Brendon Collins – assistant engineer
- Kevin McCombs – engineer
- Michael Nolasco – engineer

== Chart performance ==
It reached No. 1 on the Billboard Mainstream Rock Airplay chart in September 2022, their eighth song to do so. It was also one of the most-played songs on U.S. rock radio in 2022, ranked 27th.

== Charts ==
=== Weekly charts ===
Weekly chart performance for "No Apologies"
Chart (2022–2023)	Peak position
Canada Rock (Billboard)	32
US Mainstream Rock Airplay (Billboard)	1
US Rock & Alternative Airplay (Billboard)	4

=== Year-end charts ===
Year-end chart performance for "No Apologies"
Chart (2022)	Position
US Rock & Alternative Airplay (Billboard)	32
US Mainstream Rock Airplay (Billboard)	25
