= The Ending (Papa Roach song) =

2020 single by Papa Roach

Single by Papa Roach

from the album Who Do You Trust? and Greatest Hits Vol. 2: The Better Noise Years
- Released: November 13, 2020
- Genre: Rap rock
- Length: 3:29
- Label: Better Noise
- Songwriters: Jacoby Shaddix; Jerry Horton; Tobin Esperance; Anthony Esperance; Colin Brittain; Nicholas Furlong
- Producers: Brittain; Furlong

Papa Roach singles chronology
"Feel Like Home" (2020)	"The Ending" (2020)	"Last Resort (Reloaded)" (2021)

Music video
- "The Ending (Remastered 2020)" on YouTube

"The Ending" is a song by American rock band Papa Roach. It is the sixth single and opening track from their tenth album, Who Do You Trust?. It reached No. 1 on the Billboard Mainstream Rock Airplay chart in March 2021.

== Background and release ==
A remastered version of the song, titled "The Ending (Remastered 2020)", was released on 13 November 2020 as the lead single and music video from the compilation album Greatest Hits Vol. 2: The Better Noise Years. The release was accompanied by a music video that includes footage from the horror thriller The Retaliators, which features Jacoby Shaddix in his acting debut as the character Quinn Brady.

The remastered recording was also released as the lead single from the film's official soundtrack. Shaddix said that he saw the project as a chance to broaden his work as an artist while collaborating with the film's creative team.

== Composition and reception ==
Dylan Tuck of The Skinny described the song as a modern rap-rock anthem. Paul Travers of Kerrang! wrote that the song begins with an ambient opening and features an "utterly inescapable hook". Nik Young of Metal Hammer wrote that the song has a "Tron‑worthy, electronic opening" and described it as one of the album's stickiest tracks. Erin Winans of MXDWN wrote that the song moves between vocals of different styles and that it is more similar in style to the band's earlier material. Billboard wrote that trust is a recurring theme on the album and that "The Ending" deals with the subject in a familial context.

== Track listing ==
The Ending (Remastered) – by Papa Roach single
No.	Title	Length
1.	"The Ending"	3:29

== Chart performance ==
It reached No. 1 on the Billboard Mainstream Rock Airplay chart on March 13, 2021, their sixth song to do so.

== Personnel ==
Credits adapted from Tidal.

Papa Roach

- Jacoby Shaddix – lead vocals, songwriter
- Jerry Horton – guitar, songwriter
- Tobin Esperance – bass, songwriter
- Tony Palermo – drums

Additional credits

- Anthony Esperance – guitar, songwriter
- Colin Brittain – songwriter, producer
- Nicholas Furlong – songwriter, producer

== Charts ==
=== Weekly charts ===
Weekly chart performance for "The Ending"
Chart (2020–2021)	Peak position
Canada Rock (Billboard)	37
US Rock & Alternative Airplay (Billboard)	14
US Mainstream Rock Airplay (Billboard)	1

=== Year-end charts ===
Year-end chart performance for "The Ending"
Chart (2021)	Position
US Mainstream Rock Airplay (Billboard)	29
