= Kill the Noise (song) =

2021 single by Papa Roach

Single by Papa Roach

from the album Ego Trip
- Released: 9 September 2021
- Genre: Nu metal
- Length: 3:08
- Label: New Noize Records
- Songwriters: Jacoby Shaddix; Tobin Esperance; Anthony Esperance; Andrew Goldstein; Drew Fulk
- Producers: Andrew Goldstein; WZRD BLD

Papa Roach singles chronology
"Swerve" (2021)	"Kill the Noise" (2021)	"Stand Up" (2022)

"Kill the Noise (acoustic)" single artwork

Music video
- "Kill the Noise" on YouTube

"Kill the Noise" is a song by American rock band Papa Roach. It is the lead single and first track from their eleventh album Ego Trip. It reached No. 1 on the Billboard Mainstream Rock Airplay chart in November 2021.

== Background and release ==
The single was released alongside an official music video on September 9, 2021. Shaddix said the song is about dealing with mental "static" and finding moments of calm amid inner noise. The track was produced by WZRD BLD (Drew Fulk) and Andrew Goldstein. It followed the band's previous single, "Swerve". The music video, directed by Jacoby Shaddix's brother Bryson Roatch, features a raw and energetic performance depicting a journey of escaping the confines of one's own mind. The band described the song as "probably our hardest rocking new song in four years". In December 2021, they announced the first leg of their 2022 North American "Kill the Noise" tour, which shared its name with the single. Shaddix noted that the single had seen "a ton of success".

== Composition and lyrics ==
Lyrically, the song deals with mental struggles and anxieties. Blabbermouth described it as featuring heavy riffs and emotional lyrics. According to Wall of Sound, the track features bouncy beats, crushing guitars, an anthemic chorus, and an angsty "shut-up" vocal scream, giving the song Linkin Park vibes. Shaddix described the song as "heavy music catharsis" and "a reminder to find that moment of peace from the noise". Metal Hammer noted the guitars' "nu metal bounce" on the track.

== Reception ==
Chad Childers of Loudwire suggested that Shaddix's "shut up" in the song could stand alongside "One Step Closer". Sputnikmusic criticized the song's "mind-numbingly simple riff" and chorus for "shamelessly copying" "Teardrops", but considered it one of the album's more listenable tracks. Megan Jenkins of Distorted Sound described the track as a strong opener, citing its "screaming whammy guitar riff", clapping beats, and "modern metal techniques and melody styles". Katie Conway-Flood of Gigwise called the song a "killer" opener, describing its heavy guitar work, "soaring choruses", prominent breakdown, and "lyrics that cut deep", and suggested that it was perhaps the first taste of Papa Roach doing heavy since 2015. Steve Beebee of Kerrang! said the track combines heaviness and melody, calling it one of the album's "instant hits... jostling for attention." Wall of Sound described the song as a "straight up rock" track.

== Track listing ==
All tracks are written by Jacoby Shaddix, Tobin Esperance, and Anthony Esperance, including additional where noted.

"Kill the Noise" single
No.	Title	Writer(s)	Length
1.	"Kill the Noise" (explicit)	Andrew Goldstein; Drew Fulk	3:08
2.	"Swerve (featuring Fever 333 & Sueco)" (explicit)	Colin Brittain; Nick Furlong; Spencer Nezey; Jason Aalon Butler; Sueco	2:48
Total length:			5:56

"Kill the Noise (acoustic)" single
No.	Title	Length
1.	"Kill the Noise" (acoustic)	2:41
2.	"Kill the Noise" (explicit)	3:08
Total length:		5:49

== Chart performance ==
It reached No. 1 on the Billboard Mainstream Rock Airplay chart on November 20, 2021, their seventh song to do so. It was their second No. 1 on the chart for 2021, making it the first time that they had two No. 1's in the same year.

== Personnel ==
Credits adapted from Apple Music.

- Jacoby Shaddix – vocals, songwriter
- Tobin Esperance – bass, songwriter
- Anthony Esperance – guitar, songwriter
- Jerry Horton – guitar
- Tony Palermo – drums

Production

- Andrew Goldstein – songwriter, producer
- Drew Fulk – songwriter, producer

== Charts ==
=== Weekly charts ===
Weekly chart performance for "Kill the Noise"
Chart (2021–2022)	Peak position
Canada Rock (Billboard)	22
US Hot Rock & Alternative Songs (Billboard)	26
US Rock & Alternative Airplay (Billboard)	4
US Mainstream Rock Airplay (Billboard)	1

=== Year-end charts ===
Year-end chart performance for "Kill the Noise"
Chart (2022)	Position
US Rock & Alternative Airplay (Billboard)	22
US Mainstream Rock Airplay (Billboard)	19
