= Born for Greatness (song) =

Single by Papa Roach

from the album Crooked Teeth
- Released: November 12, 2017
- Recorded: 2017
- Genre: Rock; rap rock
- Length: 3:47 (album version)
- Label: Eleven Seven
- Songwriters: Jacoby Shaddix; Jerry Horton; Tobin Esperance; Jason Evigan
- Producers: RAS; Colin Brittain

Papa Roach singles chronology
"American Dreams" (2017)	"Born for Greatness" (2017)	"Periscope" (2018)

Music video
- "Born for Greatness" on YouTube

"Born for Greatness" is a song by American rock band Papa Roach. It was their third single off of their album Crooked Teeth. The song topped the Billboard Mainstream Rock Songs chart in 2018.

== Background ==
"Born for Greatness" was first released on March 31, 2017, in a lyric video, to promote the then-coming release of Papa Roach's eighth studio album, Crooked Teeth. In April 2017, the song was used as the theme song for the 2017 iteration of WWE Payback, and was later used as the theme for Raw, beginning on January 29, 2018 and ending on September 23, 2019. In addition to the studio recording of the song being released on Crooked Teeth on May 19, 2017. Two days after the album's release, the band released a live recording of an alternate version of the song performed at Rock on the Range with a high school marching band. A separate, live version of the band performing song by themselves was released on a separate EP entitled Live At BBC Radio 1 in October 2017. In November 2017, the song was released as Crooked Teeth's third official single, after "Help" and "American Dreams", and in December 2017, a full music video was released, featuring footage of the band performing the song from their 2017 European tour. The song peaked at number one on the Billboard Mainstream Rock Songs chart in 2018.

== Themes and composition ==
Music journalists noted the song's sound to be a mix of Papa Roach's rock sound with more modern-pop music, a sound the band had intended to pursue upon working with music producers Nicholas "RAS" Furlong and Colin Brittain on the Crooked Teeth album. The song was also the only from the album to feature a collaboration with Jason Evigan of rock band After Midnight Project. AllMusic described the song's sound as a mix of "in-your-face guitar riffage with slick, neon-toned choruses that bring to mind the similarly adept emo-rock of bands like Fall Out Boy and My Chemical Romance." Similarly, Team Rock described it as "war cry thump" with "pop tinged motifs" that are "oddly infectious". Loudwire noted elements of dubstep in the track too, such as pitch shifting in Shaddix's vocals in the pre-chorus, and a bass drop.

== Personnel ==
- Jacoby Shaddix – lead vocals
- Jerry Horton – guitar
- Tobin Esperance – bass
- Tony Palermo – drums

== Charts ==
=== Weekly charts ===
Weekly chart performance for "Born for Greatness"
Chart (2018)	Peak position
Canada Rock (Billboard)	24
Czech Republic Rock (IFPI)	5
Germany Rock Airplay (Official German Charts)	13
US Hot Rock & Alternative Songs (Billboard)	22
US Rock & Alternative Airplay (Billboard)	13

=== Year-end charts ===
Year-end chart performance for "Born for Greatness"
Chart (2018)	Position
US Hot Rock Songs (Billboard)	57

== Certifications ==
Certifications for "Born for Greatness"
Region	Certification	Certified units/sales
Canada (Music Canada)	Gold	40,000^{‡}
^{‡} Sales+streaming figures based on certification alone.
