= Come Around (Papa Roach song) =

Single by Papa Roach

from the album Who Do You Trust?
- Released: 2019
- Recorded: 2018
- Genre: Alternative rock
- Label: Eleven Seven
- Songwriters: Nicholas Furlong; Colin Brittain; Jacoby Shaddix; Jerry Horton; Tobin Esperance

Papa Roach singles chronology
"Born for Greatness" (2018)	"Come Around" (2019)	"Cut the Line" (2023)

Music video
- "Come Around" on YouTube

"Come Around" is a song by American rock band Papa Roach. It was their third single off of their album Who Do You Trust?. It topped the Billboard Mainstream Rock Songs chart in December 2019.

== Background and themes ==
The song was released as the third single from the band's tenth studio album, Who Do You Trust?. A music video was released for the single in September 2019. Lyrically, frontman Jacoby Shaddix states that the song is about sticking with friends and loved ones during hard times in their lives. The song was written around mental health awareness, with Shaddix elaborating that it was also about the power of music to connect with people to overcome adversity. Shaddix stated that the song was about himself to a certain capacity as well, in his feeling that music helps him feel connected to something "bigger than [him]self". The song's music video plays into the themes as well, focusing on a fan that was affected by the band's music. The video focuses around the band's long-time fan Mark Moreno, who had followed the band since their breakout in 2000, and had attended over 60 lives shows since then. The band invite Moreno to a concert, thank him for his support, give him a plaque to honor his sister who had died in 2016, and awarded him two tickets for Papa Roach live shows for life.

== Reception ==
The song and music video was generally well received, with Rock Sound calling it "heartwarming" and "genuinely, genuinely great". Allmusic similarly praised the track for being "heartfelt" with Shaddix's "emotive croon" standing out on the track.

== Personnel ==
- Jacoby Shaddix – lead vocals
- Jerry Horton – guitar
- Tobin Esperance – bass
- Tony Palermo – drums

== Charts ==
Chart (2019)	Peak position
US Mainstream Rock (Billboard)	1
