= Before I Die (disambiguation) =

Before I Die is a 2007 young adult novel by Jenny Downham.

Before I Die may also refer to:

- "Before I Die" (Eamon song), 2017
- "Before I Die" (Papa Roach song), 2013
- Before I Die (album), a 2021 studio album by Park Hye Jin
- Before I Die (Playhouse 90), a 1958 American television film
- Before I Die (film), an upcoming British film in Bangla and English
- "Before I Die" (short story), a 1947 Nero Wolfe mystery novella by Rex Stout
- "Before I Die" (Miranda), a 2010 television episode
