= The Connection (Papa Roach album) =

Studio album by Papa Roach
- Released: October 2, 2012
- Studio: Red House Studios (Sacramento, California); Red Level Three Studios (Nashville Tennessee); Foxy Studios (Woodland Hills, California)
- Genre: Hard rock; electronic rock; rap rock; nu metal
- Length: 44:25
- Label: Eleven Seven
- Producer: James Michael; John Feldmann

Papa Roach chronology
Time for Annihilation (2010)	The Connection (2012)	F.E.A.R. (2015)

Singles from The Connection
- 1. "Still Swingin'" Released: July 24, 2012; 2. "Where Did the Angels Go" Released: November 20, 2012; 3. "Before I Die" Released: January 22, 2013; 4. "Leader of the Broken Hearts" Released: May 7, 2013

The Connection is the seventh studio album by American rock band Papa Roach. It was released on October 2, 2012, through Eleven Seven Music. The album was produced by Sixx:A.M. vocalist James Michael, who co-produced the band's previous full-length album Metamorphosis, and Goldfinger vocalist John Feldmann. The first single, "Still Swingin'", was released on July 24, 2012.

A lyric video to the song "Before I Die" was released on Papa Roach's YouTube channel on November 15, 2012. On November 19, 2012, The Connection was released as a vinyl record, making it the first Papa Roach album to be released in that format.

The album features several songs with electronic influences. Some tracks on the album feature a return to the nu metal style rapping vocals of the band's early releases.

== Background ==
Jacoby Shaddix has described the album as a "rediscovery of the basic elements of Papa Roach." He states: "We kind of went back and looked at the history of our band and really thought about… Creatively, what evolutions have we gone through? When we came in, it was, like, metal and hip-hop and nu-metal, and then we kind of got more into straight-ahead rock and then we added pop elements to our band. So this record just encompasses everything we’ve done from the beginning to where we are currently as a band; it just kind of connects the dots of all the elements of our sound over the years." "There's some hip-hop, more keyboards than before, sound loops, textures—it's dynamic, diverse and vulnerable. That is Papa Roach. We have never sounded better," said Shaddix.

Regarding the album's title, Shaddix stated it was one of many different titles the band went through. "We always just kept coming back to ‘The Connection,’" stated Shaddix. "What ‘The Connection’ means to us, it’s our connection to the music, it’s the connection of this music to the fans, it’s the connection that we make onstage with our music, it’s the connection from fan-to-fan on the social Internet marketing media world."

== Reception ==
Professional ratings
Aggregate scores
Source	Rating
Metacritic	62/100
Review scores
Source	Rating
AllMusic	3/5 stars
Classic Rock	3/5 stars
Kerrang!	4/5 stars
Loudwire	3.5/5 stars
Melodic	3/5 stars
Metal Hammer	3.5/5 stars
MusicOMH	1.5/5 stars
Q	3/5 stars
Revolver	4/5 stars
Ultimate Guitar	5.7/10

According to the review aggregator Metacritic, The Connection received "generally favorable reviews" based on a weighted average score of 62 out of 100 from 6 critic scores.

AllMusic gave the album 3 stars out of 5 saying: "[the album strikes] a balance between [the band's] early roots as a nu-metal/rap-rock outfit and its more recent interest in '80s-style Sunset Strip hard rock... The Connection includes some creatively slick sounds that flow from buzzy, processed distortion to pulsating, atmospheric electronic flourishes."

== Track listing ==
All tracks are written by Papa Roach and James Michael, except where noted.

No.	Title	Writer(s)	Length
1.	"Engage"		0:51
2.	"Still Swingin'"	Papa Roach, John Feldmann, Tylias	3:24
3.	"Where Did the Angels Go"	Anthony Esperance, James Michael, Papa Roach	3:10
4.	"Silence Is the Enemy"		2:53
5.	"Before I Die"		4:25
6.	"Wish You Never Met Me"		4:05
7.	"Give Me Back My Life"		4:00
8.	"Breathe You In"		3:07
9.	"Leader of the Broken Hearts"		4:12
10.	"Not That Beautiful" (feat. Shahnaz)		3:18
11.	"Walking Dead"		3:18
12.	"Won't Let Up"		4:00
13.	"As Far as I Remember"		3:42
Total length:			44:25

Japanese edition
No.	Title	Length
14.	"Set Me Off"	3:28
15.	"What's Left of Me"	2:58
Total length:		50:51

Deluxe edition
No.	Title	Length
14.	"What's Left of Me"	2:58
15.	"9th Life" (co-written by Martin Johnson)	3:13
Total length:		50:36

iTunes deluxe edition
No.	Title	Length
14.	"You Gotta Want It"	3:39
15.	"Kick in the Teeth" (video)	3:11
16.	"Burn" (uncut video)	3:37
17.	"No Matter What" (video)	3:50
18.	"Still Swingin'" (video)	3:22
19.	"Constructing the Connection" (video)	3:17
20.	"Behind the Scenes: Making of Still Swingin'" (video)	2:12
Total length:		67:33

== Sales ==
"The Connection", sold 22,000 copies in the United States in its first week of release to land at position No. 17 on The Billboard 200 chart. The CD arrived in stores on October 2 via Eleven Seven Music. It charted higher and sold more than Papa Roach's previous album, 2010's "Time For Annihilation ... On the Road & On the Record", which opened with 16,000 units to debut at position No. 23 on The Billboard 200 chart, but underperformed compared to the band's 2009 CD, "Metamorphosis", which premiered at #8 with nearly 44,000 copies.

"The Connection" has sold more than 109,000 copies in the US as of 2015.

== Personnel ==
Credits adapted from the album's liner notes.

=== Papa Roach ===
- Jacoby Shaddix – vocals, co-production
- Jerry Horton – guitar, background vocals, co-production (all tracks); programming (track 13)
- Tobin Esperance – guitar, bass, programming, keyboards, backing vocals
- Tony Palermo – drums

=== Additional contributors ===
- James Michael – production, recording (1, 3–13); mixing, additional programming (all tracks)
- John Feldmann – production, recording (2)
- Brandon Paddock – additional engineering, additional programming
- Anthony Esperance – engineering assistance
- John DeNosky – Pro Tools editing
- Shahnaz – background vocals (10)
- Dave Donnelly – mastering
- Android Jones – art direction, design
- Michael Robinson – art direction, design

== Charts ==
Chart (2012)	Peak position
Austrian Albums Chart	24
Belgian Ultratop (Wallonia)	117
Belgian Ultratop (Flanders)	106
Dutch Albums Chart	83
French Albums Chart	163
German Albums Chart	27
Japanese Albums Chart	134
Scottish Albums	41
Swiss Albums Chart	21
UK Albums Chart	37
US Billboard 200	17
US Top Rock Albums (Billboard)	7
