= Crooked Teeth =

Crooked Teeth may refer to:

- Malocclusion, a misalignment or incorrect relation between teeth
- "Crooked Teeth" (Death Cab for Cutie song), 2006
- Crooked Teeth (album), a 2017 album by Papa Roach
  - "Crooked Teeth" (Papa Roach song)
