= Ego Trip (Papa Roach album) =

Studio album by Papa Roach
- Released: April 8, 2022
- Recorded: 2020–2021
- Genres: Hard rock; nu metal; pop-punk; rap rock; rapcore; rap metal
- Length: 42:52 (standard edition); 62:47 (deluxe edition)
- Label: New Noize
- Producers: Colin Brittain; Jason Evigan; Nicholas Furlong; Andrew Goldstein; Papa Roach; Drew Fulk

Papa Roach chronology
Who Do You Trust? (2019)	Ego Trip (2022)

Singles from Ego Trip
- 1. "Swerve" Released: August 21, 2021; 2. "Kill the Noise" Released: September 9, 2021; 3. "Stand Up" Released: January 20, 2022; 4. "Cut the Line" Released: March 1, 2022; 5. "No Apologies" Released: April 4, 2022; 6. "Leave a Light On (Talk Away the Dark)" Released: October 31, 2023

Ego Trip is the eleventh studio album by American rock band Papa Roach. It was released on April 8, 2022, through New Noize. Six singles have been released from the album: "Swerve", "Kill the Noise", "Stand Up", "Cut the Line", "No Apologies", and "Leave a Light On (Talk Away the Dark)".

== Promotion ==
On August 1, 2021, the band released a new single entitled "Swerve", featuring Jason Aalon Butler of Fever 333 and American rapper Sueco. On September 9, 2021, Papa Roach released the first radio single "Kill the Noise" from their upcoming eleventh studio album in 2022. On October 29, 2021, the band released a new song "Dying to Believe". On January 21, 2022, "Stand Up" followed as the album's fourth single. The fourth single "Cut the Line" was released on March 1, 2022. The album Ego Trip was announced on the same day and was released on April 8, 2022. A fifth single "No Apologies" was released on April 4, 2022. On January 6, 2023, the band released a new version of "Swerve", featuring Hollywood Undead. In the same month, on January 27, they released a new version of another song, "Cut the Line", featuring Beartooth frontman Caleb Shomo. In January 2023, a deluxe edition of Ego Trip was announced. The deluxe edition was exclusively released digitally on March 17, 2023.

== Critical reception ==
Professional ratings
Aggregate scores
Source	Rating
Metacritic	68/100
Review scores
Source	Rating
Clash	7/10
Classic Rock	3.5/5 stars
Distorted Sound Mag	8/10
Gigwise	8/10 stars
Kerrang!	4/5 stars
Metal Hammer	3.5/5 stars
Sputnikmusic	1.5/5

According to the review aggregator Metacritic, Ego Trip received "generally favorable reviews" based on a weighted average score of 68 out of 100 from four critic scores. It was given three and a half out of five stars by Metal Hammer, with reviewer Elliot Leaver saying, "This is a presentation of 14 tracks that don't outstay their welcome and pack in as much as they can for maximum impact."

== Commercial performance ==
Ego Trip debuted within the top 40 in three different countries worldwide, including Germany, Scotland and Switzerland, charting the highest and peaking within the top 10 at number nine on the Swiss Hitparade chart. The album was considered a commercial disappointment in the United Kingdom, becoming the first album by the band to fail to chart on the UK Albums Chart, though it peaked on the UK Album Sales and UK Rock & Metal Albums Chart at number 18 and three respectively. In the United States, the album debuted at number 115 on the US Billboard 200 selling 6,900 copies in its first week, becoming the lowest charting album released by the band in their home country. As of September 2022, Ego Trip had collated a total of 62,000 album equivalent units in the US. By February 2024, sales of the album had doubled and stood at 125,000 total units sold. Sales of the album in the US had surpassed 180,000 units by March 2025. In September 2025, it was reported that the album had reached a cumulative total of 204,000 album equivalent units.

== Track listing ==
All tracks are produced by Colin "DOC" Brittain, Nick Furlong, and Papa Roach, except where noted.

Ego Trip track listing
No.	Title	Producer(s)	Length
1.	"Kill the Noise"	WZRD BLD; Andrew Goldstein	3:08
2.	"Stand Up"	Jason Evigan; Brittain (add.); Kevin McCombs (add.); Michael Nolasco (add.); Jonathan Gering (add.)	3:48
3.	"Swerve" (featuring Fever 333 and Sueco)		2:48
4.	"Bloodline"		2:26
5.	"Liar"	Evigan; McCombs (add.); Nolasco (add.); Gering (add.)	2:58
6.	"Ego Trip"		2:54
7.	"Unglued"		3:00
8.	"Dying to Believe"	WZRD BLD	3:01
9.	"Killing Time"		3:23
10.	"Leave a Light On (Talk Away the Dark)"		3:07
11.	"Always Wandering"	WZRD BLD; Furlong	2:46
12.	"No Apologies"		3:08
13.	"Cut the Line"		3:29
14.	"I Surrender"		2:54
Total length:			42:54

Deluxe Edition bonus tracks
No.	Title	Length
15.	"Spotlight" (demo)	3:50
16.	"Swerve" (Rockzilla remix; featuring Hollywood Undead)	2:47
17.	"Cut the Line" (featuring Caleb Shomo)	3:18
18.	"Stand Up" (featuring the Battle Drum Marching Band)	3:50
19.	"Stand Up" (Bloody Beetroots remix)	3:35
20.	"Dying to Believe" (acoustic)	2:40
Total length:		62:49

== Personnel ==
Papa Roach

- Jacoby Shaddix – vocals
- Jerry Horton – guitars
- Tobin Esperance – bass
- Tony Palermo – drums

Additional musicians

- Anthony Esperance – additional guitars
- Jonathan Gering – keyboards, programming
- Erica Sliver – backing vocals
- Meron Ryan – backing vocals
- Andrew Migliore – string arrangements

Production

- Colin Brittain – producer, mixing
- Andrew Goldstein – producer
- Jonathan Gering – producer
- Jason Evigan – producer, engineering
- Nicholas Furlong – producer, engineering
- Drew Fulk – producer, engineering
- Chris Athens – mastering
- Jim Hughes – layout
- Kevin McCombs – additional production on track three
- Michael Nolasco – producer, engineering
- Brenden Collins – assistant engineering
- Darren Craig – creative director, design
- Bryson Roatch – creative director

== Appearances ==
- "No Apologies" was released as downloadable content for the video game Rock Band 4 in 2023.

== Charts ==
Chart performance for Ego Trip
Chart (2022)	Peak position
Austrian Albums (Ö3 Austria)	18
Belgian Albums (Ultratop Flanders)	163
German Albums (Offizielle Top 100)	14
Scottish Albums (Official Charts)	32
Swiss Albums (Schweizer Hitparade)	9
UK Album Sales (OCC)	18
UK Album Downloads (Official Charts)	15
UK Independent Albums (Official Charts)	10
UK Physical Albums (OCC)	24
UK Rock & Metal Albums (Official Charts)	3
US Billboard 200	115
US Top Rock Albums (Billboard)	21
US Top Hard Rock Albums (Billboard)	6
US Top Alternative Albums (Billboard)	14
US Top Album Sales (Billboard)	12
