= F.E.A.R. (Papa Roach album) =

Studio album by Papa Roach
- Released: January 27, 2015
- Recorded: 2014
- Genres: Alternative metal; hard rock; electronic rock; nu metal
- Length: 36:07
- Label: Eleven Seven
- Producers: Kane Churko; Kevin Churko

Papa Roach chronology
The Connection (2012)	F.E.A.R. (2015)	Crooked Teeth (2017)

Singles from F.E.A.R.
- 1. "Face Everything and Rise" Released: November 4, 2014; 2. "Gravity" Released: April 22, 2015; 3. "Falling Apart" Released: December 25, 2015

F.E.A.R. is the eighth studio album by American rock band Papa Roach. It was released on January 27, 2015.

"When you see the word, it looks like Fear. If you look deeper, it's Face Everything And Rise." Speaking to Loudwire, Jacoby Shaddix explained the meaning of this song: "It's about stepping up to your problems," he said, "and connecting with my God and walking through those things."

F.E.A.R. sold 24,425 copies in the United States in its first week of release to land at position No. 15 on the Billboard 200 chart, charting higher than their previous albums Time for Annihilation: On the Record & On the Road and The Connection, also outselling both of them. It is their first top 15 album in the UK since Lovehatetragedy, as well as their first album to chart higher in the UK than in the US. It also managed to chart in many territories worldwide where many of their previous releases failed to chart. As of April 2016, the album has sold 84,000 copies in the United States.

== History ==
On February 4, 2014, the band announced that they will be going into the studio to record a new album.

On February 18, guitarist Jerry Horton stated that the first single should come out in July 2014, but the first official single (the title track) was not revealed until August, and the single release date was delayed until November.

On February 25, the band participated in a live chat and mentioned that they have already written 4 songs. They revealed the titles of three songs: "Broken as Me", "Gravity", and "War Over Me".

On April 24, during an interview for Loudwire, vocalist Jacoby Shaddix revealed more song titles from the album: "Never Have to Say Goodbye" and "Face Everything and Rise". On August 30, 2014, it was revealed that the title track, "Face Everything and Rise" would be the album's first single and that the video would be codirected by Shaddix.

The album was streamed on YouTube on January 22, 2015, five days before its scheduled release on the Eleven Seven Music YouTube channel.

== Critical reception ==
Professional ratings
Aggregate scores
Source	Rating
Metacritic	58/100
Review scores
Source	Rating
AllMusic	3/5 stars
Classic Rock	2.5/5 stars
HM	3.5/5 stars
Melodic	3.5/5 stars
Metal Hammer	3.5/5 stars
Q	3/5 stars
Rolling Stone	2.5/5 stars

According to the review aggregator Metacritic, F.E.A.R. received "mixed or average reviews" based on a weighted average score of 58 out of 100 from 5 critic scores.

== Singles ==
The title track "Face Everything and Rise" was released digitally on November 4, 2014, as their first single.

The song " Gravity" was released on April 22, 2015, as their second single along with the music video.

The song "Falling Apart" was released on January 18, 2015, on Radio 1 Rock Show on BBC Radio 1 and was released on Christmas Day on Mainstream Rock as the third single.

The fourth single "Devil" was released on March 26, 2016.

The fifth and final single "Broken as Me" was released on April 26, 2016

== Track listing ==
No.	Title	Writer(s)	Length
1.	"Face Everything and Rise"	Jacoby Shaddix; Tobin Esperance; Anthony Esperance; Kane Churko	3:11
2.	"Skeletons"	Shaddix; T. Esperance; Jerry Horton; Kevin Churko	3:55
3.	"Broken as Me"	Shaddix; T. Esperance; A. Esperance; Kevin Churko; Horton	3:37
4.	"Falling Apart"	Shaddix; T. Esperance; A. Esperance; Kane Churko	3:08
5.	"Love Me Till It Hurts"	Shaddix; T. Esperance; Horton; Kane Churko	3:43
6.	"Never Have to Say Goodbye"	Shaddix; T. Esperance; Horton; Kane Churko	3:47
7.	"Gravity" (featuring Maria Brink of In This Moment)	Shaddix; T. Esperance; Horton; Kevin Churko; Maria Brink	4:04
8.	"War Over Me"	Shaddix; T. Esperance; A. Esperance; Kevin Churko; Horton	3:58
9.	"Devil"	Shaddix; T. Esperance; Horton; Kane Churko	3:27
10.	"Warriors" (featuring Royce da 5'9")	Shaddix; T. Esperance; Horton; Kane Churko	2:55
Total length:			36:07

CD and iTunes edition bonus tracks
No.	Title	Writer(s)	Length
11.	"Hope for the Hopeless"	Shaddix; T. Esperance; Horton; Kane Churko	2:59
12.	"Fear Hate Love"	Shaddix; T. Esperance; Horton; Kevin Churko	3:27
Total length:			42:33

CD deluxe edition bonus tracks
No.	Title	Length
13.	"Face Everything and Rise" (live)	3:14
14.	"Leader of the Broken Hearts" (live)	3:52
15.	"Scars" (live)	3:09
Total length:		52:48

== Personnel ==
Papa Roach

- Jacoby Shaddix – vocals
- Tobin Esperance – guitar, bass, programming, additional programming (2, 3, 7, 8, 12)
- Jerry Horton – guitars, background vocals
- Tony Palermo – drums

Additional personnel

- Kane Churko – producing, engineering, mixing, and mastering (1, 4–6, 9–11); additional engineering, programming, and editing (2, 3, 7, 8, 12)
- Kevin Churko – producing, engineering, mixing, and mastering (2, 3, 7, 8, 12)
- Shawn McGhee – additional engineering and editing
- Nick Helbling – additional editing
- Anthony Esperance – additional programming (2, 3, 7, 8, 12)

== Charts ==
Chart (2015)	Peak position
Australian Albums (ARIA)	29
Austrian Albums (Ö3 Austria)	8
Belgian Albums (Ultratop Flanders)	47
Belgian Albums (Ultratop Wallonia)	113
Dutch Albums (Album Top 100)	32
Finnish Albums (Suomen virallinen lista)	90
German Albums (Offizielle Top 100)	6
Irish Albums (IRMA)	71
Japanese Albums (Oricon)	110
Scottish Albums (OCC)	13
UK Albums (OCC)	13
UK Rock & Metal Albums (OCC)	2
US Billboard 200	15
US Top Hard Rock Albums (Billboard)	1
