= American Dreams (song) =

Single by Papa Roach

from the album Crooked Teeth
- Released: April 21, 2017
- Recorded: 2016
- Genre: Hard rock
- Length: 3:23
- Label: Eleven Seven
- Songwriters: Jacoby Shaddix; Anthony Esperance; Nicholas Furlong
- Producers: Nicholas Furlong; Colin Brittain

Papa Roach singles chronology
"Help" (2017)	"American Dreams" (2017)	"Born for Greatness" (2017)

Music video
- "American Dreams" on YouTube

"American Dreams" is a single by American rock band Papa Roach, from their studio album Crooked Teeth. It peaked at number three on the Billboard Mainstream Rock Songs chart in 2017.

== Background ==
The song was released as a single on April 21, 2017. A lyric video was released a week later, on April 28, featuring a static-filled television set that flashes images of war and the American flag alongside the song's lyrics. The band released a video of a live acoustic performance of the song in July 2017. In August 2017, the band released a music video for the song, consisting of the band interviewing Americans about their thoughts about the hardships of achieving the "American Dream", interviewing people in a school, barbershop, a boxing gym, and tattoo parlor.

== Composition and themes ==
The band teamed up with modern music producers Nicholas Furlong and Colin Brittain to create a sound for the song that melded the band's nu metal sound from their first major record label release Infest, with more modern sounding music. The song starts with a simple guitar chord being played, leading to a heavier, wall of sound of guitar by Jerry Horton and vocals by band frontman Jacoby Shaddix. Shaddix delivers forceful and rhythmic aggressive vocals in the verses, leading up to a large, soaring melodic chorus. Lyrically, the song explores sentiments of doubt and detriment in the concept of "The American Dream", with the chorus containing the lines "American lies / We're trying to see through the smoke in our eyes / So give me the truth / Don't tell me your lies / Cause it's harder to breathe / When you're buried alive by American Dreams." The lyrics were inspired by Shaddix's resentment of current state of American politics, notably the lowbrow arguments of the 2016 Presidential Debates.

== Reception ==
The song received a mixed reception from critics. Loudwire ranked it as the 19th best hard rock song of 2017. Cryptic Rock praised the song for being "quasi-political" and asking some "eerily pivotal questions", concluding that it was "an interesting direction for the band, it is a truly catchy, upbeat rocker that tackles some weighty subject matter." Conversely, "Metal Sucks" strongly criticized the song's vocals, calling it "terrible".

== Personnel ==
- Jacoby Shaddix – lead vocals
- Jerry Horton – guitar
- Tobin Esperance – bass
- Tony Palermo – drums

== Charts ==
Chart (2017)	Peak position
Czech Republic Airplay (ČNS IFPI)	16
US Mainstream Rock (Billboard)	3
US Hot Rock & Alternative Songs (Billboard)	40
US Rock & Alternative Airplay (Billboard)	17
