= Before I Die (Papa Roach song) =

Single by Papa Roach

from the album The Connection
- Released: January 22, 2013
- Genre: Electronic rock; alternative rock
- Length: 4:25
- Label: Eleven Seven
- Songwriter(s): Jacoby Shaddix; Tobin Esperance; Jerry Horton
- Producer(s): James Michael

Papa Roach singles chronology
"Where Did the Angels Go?" (2012)	"Before I Die" (2013)	"Leader of the Broken Hearts" (2013)

Music video
- "Before I Die" on YouTube

"Before I Die" is a song by American rock band Papa Roach released as the third single from their sixth studio album The Connection.

== Personnel ==
- Jacoby Shaddix – vocals
- Jerry Horton – lead guitar, backing vocals
- Tobin Esperance – bass guitar, programming, backing vocals
- Tony Palermo – drums, percussion

== Track listing ==
No.	Title	Length
1.	"Before I Die"	4:25
2.	"Before I Die (music video)"	4:26
