= Still Swingin' =

Single by Papa Roach

from the album The Connection
- Released: June 24, 2012
- Genre: Nu metal; rap metal; electronic rock
- Length: 3:15
- Label: Eleven Seven
- Songwriters: Jacoby Shaddix; Tobin Esperance; Tylias
- Producer: Tylias

Papa Roach singles chronology
| "No Matter What" (2011) | "Still Swingin'" (2012) | "Where Did the Angels Go?" (2012) |

Music video
- "Still Swingin'" on YouTube

"Still Swingin'" is a song by the American rock band Papa Roach released on June 24, 2012 as the first single from their album The Connection. The single was well received by fans for the return of the rap-style vocals of the band's early work. The track was produced by Tylias, an indie dubstep and hip-hop producer from the underground music scene. The embrace of this aggregate had polarized opinions, some calling it new and fresh to the songs and another calling it an aberration of their style and even the band, but mostly it was well received. A music video was released on August 30 as lead singer Jacoby Shaddix recovered from a vocal surgery.

== Background information ==
In an interview with Loudwire, they asked Jacoby about their upcoming single "Still Swingin'": "You’ve never been ones to shy away from the struggles of trying to make it in music and life. How important of a statement is that song at this point in your career? - It is the most important statement for the band. I think it just says a lot about P-Roach. It’s about my personal life, my highs and lows and what I’ve gone through and I’m a f—in’ survivor dude. I’m a fighter. I think it’s taking a challenge and I’m always willing to step up to it and I’m not going to go out without a fight. And P-Roach, we’re the band that no matter what we’re f—ing up against, we’re gonna prevail. I think we learned that from our early days as a rock and roll band, when every record company told us, ‘No, no, no, no,’ we’re like, ‘F— you, we’re gonna keep on doing it.’ It got us to where we’re at now and we’ve maintained that hustler spirit, that fighter spirit, that warrior spirit. And I think it’s just a great statement to put out as the first single on this record. It’s got the right energy and the right message." The song is currently being used to promote Detroit Tigers broadcasts on Fox Sports Detroit.

== Music video ==
The video shows the band performing atop a rooftop along with scenes of a zombie narrative that was suggested by Shaddix's 7-year-old son.

== Charts ==
=== Weekly charts ===
Weekly chart performance for "Still Swingin'"
| Chart (2012) | Peak position |
|---|---|
| Canada Rock (Billboard) | 43 |
| Czech Republic Rock (IFPI) | 13 |
| US Hot Rock & Alternative Songs (Billboard) | 22 |
| US Rock & Alternative Airplay (Billboard) | 17 |

=== Year-end charts ===
Year-end chart performance for "Still Swingin'"
| Chart (2012) | Position |
|---|---|
| US Hot Rock Songs (Billboard) | 62 |
