= Face Everything and Rise =

Single by Papa Roach

from the album F.E.A.R.
- Released: November 4, 2014
- Genre: Alternative metal; nu metal; electronic rock
- Length: 3:11
- Label: Better Noise
- Songwriters: Jacoby Shaddix; Tobin Esperance; Kevin Churko

Papa Roach singles chronology
"Leader of the Broken Hearts" (2013)	"Face Everything and Rise" (2014)	"Gravity" (2015)

Music video
- "Face Everything and Rise" on YouTube

"Face Everything and Rise" is a song by the American rock band Papa Roach. It served as the lead single from the band's seventh studio album F.E.A.R.. The song was released on November 4, 2014, and reached number one on the Mainstream Rock Tracks chart.

== Music video ==
A music video was released for the song on YouTube on November 4, 2014.

== Chart performance ==
Chart (2015)	Peak position
US Mainstream Rock (Billboard)	1
US Rock Songs (Billboard)	15
US Hard Rock Digital Songs (Billboard)	20
US Rock & Alternative Airplay (Billboard)	21
