= Gravity (Papa Roach song) =

Single by Papa Roach featuring Maria Brink

from the album F.E.A.R.
- Released: April 22, 2015
- Genre: Alternative metal; rap rock
- Label: Eleven Seven
- Songwriters: Jacoby Shaddix; Tobin Esperance

Papa Roach featuring Maria Brink singles chronology
"Face Everything and Rise" (2014)	"Gravity" (2015)	"Falling Apart" (2015)

Music video
- "Gravity" on YouTube

"Gravity" is a song by American rock band Papa Roach featuring vocals from Maria Brink of In This Moment. It served as the second single from the band's seventh studio album F.E.A.R.. The song was released on April 22, 2015.

== Charts ==
=== Weekly charts ===
Weekly chart performance for "Gravity"
Chart (2015)	Peak position
Czech Republic Rock (IFPI)	15
US Hot Rock & Alternative Songs (Billboard)	28
US Rock & Alternative Airplay (Billboard)	28

=== Year-end charts ===
Year-end chart performance for "Gravity"
Chart (2015)	Position
US Hot Rock Songs (Billboard)	76
