= Leave a Light On (Talk Away the Dark) =

2023 song by Papa Roach

Single by Papa Roach and Carrie Underwood

from the album Ego Trip
- Released: November 24, 2023
- Studio: East Iris Studios (Nashville, TN)
- Genre: Alternative rock
- Length: 3:07
- Label: New Noize
- Songwriters: Nick Furlong; Colin Brittain; Jacoby Shaddix; Kris Bonn; Tobin Esperance
- Producers: Colin "Doc" Brittain; Nick Furlong; Papa Roach

Papa Roach singles chronology
"Cut the Line" (2022)	"Leave a Light On (Talk Away the Dark)" (2023)	"Even If It Kills Me" (2025)

Carrie Underwood singles chronology
"Out of That Truck" (2023)	"Leave a Light On (Talk Away the Dark)" (2024)	"I'm Gonna Love You" (2024)

Music video
- "Leave a Light On (Talk Away the Dark)" on YouTube

"Leave a Light On (Talk Away the Dark)" is a song by American rock band Papa Roach. Originally released as a song on their 2022 album Ego Trip, it was released as a single on November 24, 2023, in collaboration with the American Foundation for Suicide Prevention for the Talk Away the Dark campaign.

The band later released a second version of the song in collaboration with American country singer Carrie Underwood, which was released as a charity single on August 2, 2024.

The digital EP includes a live performance of "Scars" with Chris Daughtry, the frontman of American rock band Daughtry.

== Background and composition ==
Jacoby Shaddix often dedicates the song to late Linkin Park singer Chester Bennington, who died of suicide in 2017.

Speaking about the song and raising awareness of suicide and those who struggle internally, Shaddix expressed:

"This issue doesn't just affect one of us, or a few of us, it affects all of us. We're proud to work alongside the AFSP to support their mission to bring hope to those affected by suicide, and proud that this song – which has been special to us since it was first written – can play a part in bringing a little more light to an incredibly important topic".

In 2024, the band reached out to Carrie Underwood, hoping her platform as a huge country star and a former American Idol winner would bring further awareness to the message of the song. Underwood, a huge fan of the band, accepted and provided vocals on the song at a studio in Nashville, Tennessee. When Underwood was asked about her duet with the band on Good Morning America, she stated:

"It's a cause that is very near and dear to Papa Roach and to Jacoby Shaddix who is the main vocalist. When they asked me to come sing on this song, I loved the song and I loved their cause and they work a lot with American Foundation for Suicide Prevention and they want to help people, and they want to use their life stories to help people."

== Live performances ==
On April 5, 2025, the band performed the song with Underwood for the first time at the MGM Grand Garden Arena in Las Vegas. Later on during the set, Underwood joined the band onstage again to perform "Last Resort" during the encore.

== Track listing ==
Digital EP
No.	Title	Length
1.	"Leave a Light On (Talk Away the Dark)" (with Carrie Underwood)	3:06
2.	"Leave a Light On (Talk Away the Dark)"	3:07
3.	"Scars" (live; featuring Chris Daughtry)	3:51
4.	"Leave a Light On (Talk Away the Dark)" (piano vocal)	3:06
5.	"Leave a Light On (Talk Away the Dark)" (live)	3:23
6.	"Leave a Light On (Talk Away the Dark)" (instrumental)	3:34
Total length:		20:10

Digital single
No.	Title	Length
1.	"Scars" (live; featuring Chris Daughtry)	3:51
2.	"Leave a Light On (Talk Away the Dark)"	3:07
3.	"Leave a Light On (Talk Away the Dark)" (live)	3:23
4.	"Leave a Light On (Talk Away the Dark)" (instrumental)	3:34
Total length:		13:56

== Charts ==
=== Weekly charts ===
Weekly chart performance for "Leave a Light On (Talk Away the Dark)"
Chart (2023–25)	Peak position
Australia Digital Tracks (ARIA)	37
Canada Digital Songs (Billboard)	10
Czech Republic Airplay (ČNS IFPI)	11
Czech Republic Rock (IFPI)	1
Germany Airplay (TopHit)	49
UK Singles Downloads (OCC)	40
UK Singles Sales (OCC)	43
US Digital Song Sales (Billboard)	2
US Hot Rock & Alternative Songs (Billboard)	40
US Adult Pop Airplay (Billboard)	14
US Rock & Alternative Airplay (Billboard)	10

=== Year-end charts ===
Year-end chart performance for "Leave a Light On (Talk Away the Dark)"
Chart (2024)	Position
US Rock Digital Song Sales (Billboard)	17
US Alternative Digital Song Sales (Billboard)	9
US Rock Airplay (Billboard)	20

Chart (2025)	Position
US Adult Pop Airplay (Billboard)	42

== Certifications ==
Certifications for "Leave a Light On (Talk Away the Dark)"
Region	Certification	Certified units/sales
United States (RIAA)	Gold	500,000^{‡}
^{‡} Sales+streaming figures based on certification alone.
