= Falling Apart (Papa Roach song) =

2015 single by Papa Roach

Single by Papa Roach

from the album F.E.A.R.
- Released: December 25, 2015
- Genre: Alternative metal; hard rock
- Length: 3:08
- Label: Eleven Seven
- Songwriters: Jacoby Shaddix; Tobin Esperance; Anthony Esperance; Kane Churko
- Producer: Churko

Papa Roach singles chronology
"Gravity" (2015)	"Falling Apart" (2015)	"Help" (2017)

Music video
- "Falling Apart" on YouTube

"Falling Apart" is a song by American rock band Papa Roach from their eighth studio album F.E.A.R. (2015). It was first released on January 18, 2015, on Radio 1's Rock Show on BBC Radio 1 and was released to mainstream rock on December 25, 2015 as the album's third single.

Frontman Jacoby Shaddix stated, "'Falling Apart' is an epic Papa Roach track from F.E.A.R.. The vocals are really straight forward, and then it explodes into that massive chorus—the audiences can't help but jump up and down when we play it. The dynamics of the song move you to three distinctively different places and Jesse Davey's video is truly a work of art and we're excited for people to interpret it how they may."

== Music video ==
The music video was directed by Jesse Davey and released on December 25, 2015. Some scenes in the clip depict the lyrics. The video opens with a woman who slightly resembles Lara Croft from Tomb Raider running amid chaos. She carries guns and a heavy bag that sways as she is speeding. She drops her guns and is caught in the middle of Roman candle battle and continues to drag the bag with her as she gradually loses energy and starts bleeding from her arm, with drops of blood falling onto the sand. The woman falls, revealing the bag to be full of cash. She attempts to trudge forward and escape but collapses due to her wounds, lying stretched out on the sand as fistfuls of cash are scattered around her. An elderly, homeless man finds the bag with the remaining money and faintly smile before the final scene focuses on the woman.

== Charts ==
Chart (2016)	Peak position
US Mainstream Rock (Billboard)	7
US Rock & Alternative Airplay (Billboard)	28
