= Who Do You Trust? (album) =

Studio album by Papa Roach
- Released: January 18, 2019
- Recorded: 2018
- Studio: Privacy Studios (London, England)
- Genres: Rap rock; hard rock; alternative rock; pop rock
- Length: 38:28
- Label: Eleven Seven
- Producers: Colin Brittain; Jason Evigan; Nicholas Furlong

Papa Roach chronology
| Crooked Teeth (2017) | Who Do You Trust? (2019) | Ego Trip (2022) |

Singles from Who Do You Trust?
- 1. "Who Do You Trust?" Released: October 5, 2018; 2. "Elevate" Released: December 14, 2018; 3. "Come Around" Released: August 6, 2019; 4. "Feel Like Home" Released: May 4, 2020; 5. "The Ending" Released: November 8, 2020

Who Do You Trust? is the tenth studio album by American rock band Papa Roach. It was released on January 18, 2019, through Eleven Seven Music. Six singles have been released from the album: "Who Do You Trust?", "Elevate", "Come Around", "Top of the World", "Feel Like Home" and "The Ending".

== Background and composition ==
Frontman Jacoby Shaddix told Rock Sound that because the band's plan to tour with Of Mice & Men fell through due to lead singer Austin Carlile getting sick, the band went into the studio to record: "So we went in and created five or six songs. Then we went back in June and July and took another stab at it. We have 12 songs – there's bangers in there."

Bassist Tobin Esperance stated that the band's goal for the album "was to push ourselves even further into genres that inspire us most. We have reached the place where we always wanted to be, creating new and exciting music". The two lead singles have been said to feature Papa Roach's "signature heavy rhythmic guitars and catchy hooks", while "Not the Only One" contains "melody and emotionally charged lyrics".

Drummer Tony Palermo commented that the album would be "one of the most eclectic records they'd ever done". Palermo shared that their influence came from a number of places, stating, "we're constantly influenced by things around us, and we try to create things that are a little bit different from the last things we've done." Commenting on the band's constantly changing music style, Palermo responded "we sort of paved this way, and we're evolving just as naturally, I think, as we can".

== Promotion ==
"Renegade Music" and the title track were released on October 5, 2018 with Loudwire calling the former a "driving new anthem" and the latter "aggressive and catchy". "Not the Only One" accompanied the release of the album's details. An official music video for the song was released on May 30, 2019. On December 14, the second single, "Elevate" was released and called a "catchy number" by Loudwire and compared it to the likes of Imagine Dragons. It was accompanied by an official music video released on March 25, 2019. A third single, "Come Around", along with an accompanying music video, was released in September 2019.

== Critical reception ==
Professional ratings
Aggregate scores
| Source | Rating |
|---|---|
| Metacritic | 67/100 |
Review scores
| Source | Rating |
| AllMusic | 4/5 stars |
| Classic Rock | 2/5 stars |
| Distorted Sound Mag | 5/10 |
| God Is in the TV | 5/10 |
| Kerrang! | 3/5 |
| Metal Hammer | 3.5/5 stars |
| The Skinny | 3/5 stars |

According to the review aggregator Metacritic, Who Do You Trust? received "generally favorable reviews" based on a weighted average score of 67 out of 100 from 4 critic scores. Wall of Sound rated the album 8/10 stating: "Papa Roach just continue to evolve and kill the game with being inventive, but with that old school spirit, such a hard task to do for some." Loudwire named it one of the 50 best rock albums of 2019.

== Track listing ==
All tracks produced by Nicholas "RAS" Furlong and Colin Brittain, except "Top of the World", produced by Jason Evigan.

Who Do You Trust? track listing
| No. | Title | Writer(s) | Length |
|---|---|---|---|
| 1. | "The Ending" | Jacoby Shaddix; Jerry Horton; Tobin Esperance; Anthony Esperance; Nicholas Furlong; Colin Brittain | 3:29 |
| 2. | "Renegade Music" | Shaddix; Horton; T. Esperance; A. Esperance; Furlong; Brittain | 3:29 |
| 3. | "Not the Only One" | Shaddix; Horton; T. Esperance; A. Esperance; Furlong; Brittain | 3:25 |
| 4. | "Who Do You Trust?" | Shaddix; Horton; T. Esperance; Furlong; Brittain; Tony Livadas | 3:16 |
| 5. | "Elevate" | Shaddix; Horton; T. Esperance; A. Esperance; Furlong; Brittain | 3:11 |
| 6. | "Come Around" | Shaddix; Horton; T. Esperance; A. Esperance; Furlong; Brittain | 3:30 |
| 7. | "Feel Like Home" | Shaddix; Horton; T. Esperance; A. Esperance; Furlong; Brittain | 3:10 |
| 8. | "Problems" | Shaddix; Horton; T. Esperance; A. Esperance; Furlong; Brittain; Nick Long | 3:03 |
| 9. | "Top of the World" | Jason Evigan; Shaddix; T. Esperance; Horton | 3:53 |
| 10. | "I Suffer Well" | Shaddix; Horton; T. Esperance; Furlong; Brittain | 1:21 |
| 11. | "Maniac" | Shaddix; Horton; T. Esperance; Furlong; Brittain; A. Esperance | 3:20 |
| 12. | "Better Than Life" | Shaddix; Horton; T. Esperance; Furlong; Brittain | 3:21 |
| Total length: | | | 38:28 |

== Personnel ==
Papa Roach

- Tobin Esperance – bass
- Jerry Horton – guitars
- Tony Palermo – drums
- Jacoby Shaddix – lead vocals

Additional musicians

- Jonathan Gering – programming
- Meron Ryan – additional backing vocals

Production

- Colin Brittain – mixing, engineering, executive production
- Rafael Fadul – mixing, engineering
- Ted Jensen – mastering
- Alex Prieto – engineering
- Brendan Collins – engineering, guitar technician
- Gian Stone – engineering
- Ryan Potesta – engineering
- Ben Sabin – engineering assistance
- David Peters – engineering assistance
- Nicholas Furlong – executive production
- Lewis Kovac – executive production
- Darren Craig – creative direction, design, photography, layout
- John Nicholson – drum technician

== Charts ==
Chart performance for Who Do You Trust?
| Chart (2019) | Peak position |
|---|---|
| Australian Albums (ARIA) | 42 |
| Austrian Albums (Ö3 Austria) | 8 |
| Belgian Albums (Ultratop Flanders) | 131 |
| Canadian Albums (Billboard) | 70 |
| Czech Albums (ČNS IFPI) | 91 |
| French Albums (SNEP) | 131 |
| German Albums (Offizielle Top 100) | 4 |
| Lithuanian Albums (AGATA) | 96 |
| Scottish Albums (Official Charts) | 12 |
| Swiss Albums (Schweizer Hitparade) | 3 |
| UK Albums (Official Charts) | 36 |
| UK Rock & Metal Albums (OCC) | 1 |
| US Billboard 200 | 73 |
| US Top Rock Albums (Billboard) | 11 |
| US Top Alternative Albums (Billboard) | 10 |
| US Top Hard Rock Albums (Billboard) | 1 |
