= Crooked Teeth (album) =

Studio album by Papa Roach
- Released: May 19, 2017
- Recorded: 2016
- Studio: Steakhouse Studios, North Hollywood, California
- Genre: Hard rock; nu metal; rap rock
- Length: 33:53
- Label: Eleven Seven
- Producer: Nicholas Furlong; Colin Brittain

Papa Roach chronology
F.E.A.R. (2015)	Crooked Teeth (2017)	Who Do You Trust? (2019)

Singles from Crooked Teeth
- 1. "Help" Released: February 2, 2017; 2. "American Dreams" Released: April 21, 2017; 3. "Born for Greatness" Released: November 12, 2017; 4. "My Medication" Released: March 8, 2018

Crooked Teeth is the ninth studio album by American rock band Papa Roach. It was released on May 19, 2017 through Eleven Seven Music. Crooked Teeth debuted at number 20 in the US and UK.

== Release ==
The title track of the album was released as a promotional single on November 1, 2016. The album's first single, "Help" was released on February 2, 2017, and topped the Billboard Mainstream Rock Songs chart in April 2017. A second single, "American Dreams", was released in April, and peaked at number three at the same chart. On November 12, 2017, a third single, "Born for Greatness" was released and topped the Billboard Mainstream Rock Songs chart in January 2018. The album debuted at number 20 on the Billboard 200 and number one on the Billboard Top Hard Rock Albums chart, selling 23,000 equivalent units, 18,000 in pure album sales.

== Reception ==
Professional ratings
Review scores
Source	Rating
AllMusic	3.5/5 stars
Classic Rock	2/5 stars
HM	4/5 stars
Metal Hammer	3.5/5 stars
Rock Sound	7/10
Spill Magazine	0/5 stars

The album has received generally positive reviews from critics. Loudwire praised the album's mix of old and new sounds from the band, concluding that "It's obvious Papa Roach aren’t straying too far outside of the lines of what made them so appealing in both the beginning of their career and in recent years, but at almost a quarter century into the game when so many of their peers have been forgotten, they continue to stay relevant. What’s most compelling about the band, other than their more than admirable longevity, is continually trying to find the balance between the then and the now. On Crooked Teeth, it’s by far the closest they've come to giving fans of both eras an equal helping of each, which is no easy feat."

== Track listing ==
Standard edition
No.	Title	Writer(s)	Length
1.	"Break the Fall"	Jacoby Shaddix; Tobin Esperance; Anthony Esperance; Nicholas Furlong; Nick Long	3:10
2.	"Crooked Teeth"	Shaddix; Jerry Horton; T. Esperance; A. Esperance; Furlong; Colin Brittain	3:03
3.	"My Medication"	Shaddix; Horton; T. Esperance; A. Esperance; Furlong; Brittain	3:15
4.	"Born for Greatness"	Shaddix; Horton; T. Esperance; Jason Evigan	3:47
5.	"American Dreams"	Shaddix; A. Esperance; Furlong	3:23
6.	"Periscope" (featuring Skylar Grey)	Shaddix; Horton; T. Esperance; Furlong; Brittain; Holly Hafermann	3:36
7.	"Help"	Shaddix; Horton; T. Esperance; A. Esperance; Furlong; Brittain	3:34
8.	"Sunrise Trailer Park" (featuring Machine Gun Kelly)	Shaddix; T. Esperance; A. Esperance; Furlong; Brittain; Long; Richard Baker	3:47
9.	"Traumatic"	Shaddix; Horton; T. Esperance; Furlong; Brittain	2:48
10.	"None of the Above"	Shaddix; Horton; T. Esperance; A. Esperance; Furlong; Brittain	3:30
Total length:			33:53

Deluxe edition bonus tracks
No.	Title	Length
11.	"Ricochet"	3:12
12.	"Nothing"	3:47
13.	"Bleeding Through"	3:23
Total length:		44:15

Deluxe edition – disc two (Papa Roach: Live at Fillmore Detroit)
No.	Title	Length
14.	"Intro"	1:12
15.	"Face Everything and Rise"	3:14
16.	"Getting Away with Murder"	4:00
17.	"Between Angels and Insects"	4:17
18.	"Where Did the Angels Go?"	5:06
19.	"Broken Home"	4:13
20.	"Burn"	4:03
21.	"Forever"	6:08
22.	"Scars"	3:40
23.	"Lifeline"	4:12
24.	"Infest"	4:17
25.	"Kick in the Teeth"	4:25
26.	"Broken as Me"	3:23
27.	"Still Swingin'"	4:44
28.	"...To Be Loved"	3:53
29.	"Last Resort"	4:44
Total length:		1:05:31

== Personnel ==
Papa Roach

- Jacoby Shaddix – lead vocals
- Jerry Horton – guitar, backing vocals
- Tobin Esperance – bass, backing vocals
- Tony Palermo – drums

Additional musicians

- Anthony Esperance – additional guitars
- Skylar Grey – additional vocals on "Periscope"
- Machine Gun Kelly – additional vocals on "Sunrise Trailer Park"

Technical personnel

- Nicholas "RAS" Furlong – production, arrangements, executive producer
- Colin "Colin Brittain" Cunningham – production, arrangements, engineering, mixing on "My Medication", "Periscope", and "None of the Above"
- Jason Evigan – production and arrangements on "Born for Greatness"
- Josh Wilbur – mixing on "Break the Fall", "Crooked Teeth", "Born for Greatness", "American Dreams", and "Help"
- Lewis Kovac – executive producer, management for 10th Street Entertainment
- Darren Craig – design and layout
- Butch Rufus – cover model
- Ian Dietrich – management for 10th Street Entertainment

== Charts ==
=== Weekly charts ===
Weekly chart performance for Crooked Teeth
Chart (2017)	Peak position
Australian Albums (ARIA)	18
Austrian Albums (Ö3 Austria)	6
Belgian Albums (Ultratop Flanders)	46
Belgian Albums (Ultratop Wallonia)	56
Canadian Albums (Billboard)	14
Dutch Albums (Album Top 100)	172
French Albums (SNEP)	176
German Albums (Offizielle Top 100)	6
New Zealand Heatseeker Albums (RMNZ)	3
Scottish Albums (OCC)	18
Swiss Albums (Schweizer Hitparade)	7
UK Albums (OCC)	20
UK Rock & Metal Albums (OCC)	2
US Billboard 200	20
US Top Hard Rock Albums (Billboard)	1
US Top Rock Albums (Billboard)	4

=== Year-end charts ===
Year-end chart performance for Crooked Teeth
Chart (2017)	Position
US Top Hard Rock Albums (Billboard)	32

== Certifications ==
Certifications for Crooked Teeth
Region	Certification	Certified units/sales
United Kingdom (BPI)	Silver	60,000^{‡}
^{‡} Sales+streaming figures based on certification alone.
