= Back 2 U =

Single by Steve Aoki and Boehm featuring Walk the Moon
- Released: May 19, 2016
- Recorded: 2016
- Genre: Tropical house; dance-pop; deep house; electro house
- Length: 4:35
- Label: Ultra Records
- Songwriters: Steve Aoki: Nick Furlong; Alexandru Constantin Crăciun; Colin Brittain; Marc Malouf; Anthony Maniscalco

Steve Aoki singles chronology
| "Melody" (2016) | "Back 2 U" (2016) | "ILYSM" (2016) |

Boehm singles chronology
| "Swallow My Pride" (2016) | "Back 2 U" (2016) | "Future Self" (2016) |

Walk the Moon singles chronology
| "Work This Body" (2016) | "Back 2 U" (2016) | "One Foot" (2017) |

Music video
- "Back 2 U" on YouTube

"Back 2 U" is a song by DJs Steve Aoki and Boehm. It features indie rock band Walk the Moon. It was released on 19 May 2016 via Ultra Records. A remix by William Black was released as a single. A remix EP was also released, featuring remixes from Bad Royale (together with Aoki), Unlike Pluto, Breathe Carolina, DBSTF, Felguk and FTampa.

== Background ==
Monique Melendez of Billboard described the song as a "dance-meets-subdued pop rock track." Speaking about the song, Aoki said "We each brought our own musical style to the track to make a song that I am so excited for everyone to hear.” Peter Rubinstein of YourEDM described the song as a "soaring progressive-tropical house track that features catchy vocals." The song has been streamed over 28 million times on Spotify.

== Music video ==
The official music video was released on 10 June 2016 via Ultra Records on YouTube.

== Track listing ==
Singles
| No. | Title | Length |
|---|---|---|
| 1. | "Back 2 U" (with Boehm featuring Walk the Moon) | 4:35 |
| 2. | "Back 2 U" (with Boehm featuring Walk the Moon) (William Black Remix) | 3:58 |

Extended play (remixes)
| No. | Title | Length |
|---|---|---|
| 1. | "Back 2 U" (with Boehm featuring Walk the Moon) (Steve Aoki & Bad Royale Remix) | 4:23 |
| 2. | "Back 2 U" (with Boehm featuring Walk the Moon) (Unlike Pluto Remix) | 3:37 |
| 3. | "Back 2 U" (with Boehm featuring Walk the Moon) (Breathe Carolina Remix) | 4:45 |
| 4. | "Back 2 U" (with Boehm featuring Walk the Moon) (DBSTF Remix) | 5:15 |
| 5. | "Back 2 U" (with Boehm featuring Walk the Moon) (Felguk Remix) | 3:57 |
| 6. | "Back 2 U" (with Boehm featuring Walk the Moon) (FTampa Remix)) | 4:34 |
| Total length: | | 26:31 |

== Charts ==
=== Weekly charts ===
| Chart (2016) | Peak position |
|---|---|
| Sweden Heatseeker (Sverigetopplistan) | 8 |
| US Hot Dance/Electronic Songs (Billboard) | 23 |

=== Year-end charts ===
| Chart (2016) | Position |
|---|---|
| US Hot Dance/Electronic Songs (Billboard) | 65 |
