= Help (Papa Roach song) =

Single by Papa Roach

from the album Crooked Teeth
- Released: February 17, 2017
- Recorded: 2016
- Genre: Hard rock
- Length: 3:34
- Label: Eleven Seven
- Songwriters: Jacoby Shaddix; Jerry Horton; Tobin Esperance; Anthony Esperance; Nicholas Furlong; Colin Brittain
- Producers: Furlong; Brittain

Papa Roach singles chronology
"Falling Apart" (2015)	"Help" (2017)	"American Dreams" (2017)

Music video
- "Help" on YouTube

"Help" is a single by American rock band Papa Roach, from their ninth studio album Crooked Teeth. It topped the Billboard Mainstream Rock Songs chart in April 2017 for six consecutive weeks.

== Background ==
The song was first released as a single on February 17, 2017. The song was produced by Nicholas Furlong and Colin Brittain, two younger, up-and-coming music producers the band chose to work with, to help find a new sound that mixed their Infest-era sound with more modern music. A music video for the song was released on May 1, 2017. Directed by Darren Craig, the video features the band performing and shows footage of unfortunate life events happening to a man wearing a bunny costume.

== Themes and composition ==
Lyrically, the song's message is centered around surviving mental health issues. The song features bass-driven verses, followed by a wash of heavy guitar and synths in the chorus, with frontman Jacoby Shaddix's recurring line in the chorus singing "I think I need help / I’m drowning in myself". Rock Sound described the song as "infectious, emotional...powerful...a cry for help in musical form". Shaddix described the song:

With a track like Help, that song kind of harkens back to 'Scars', but it’s a little bit more uptempo and upbeat than Scars is. But it’s just a dark anthem, and I like that juxtaposition...We tapped into that on a track like Scars back in the day, and we were, like, ‘All right. Let’s see if we wrote something in a major key again.’ We’ve done that with songs like Lifeline in the past...It’s got a little element of some old school with some new school.

== Personnel ==
- Jacoby Shaddix – lead vocals
- Jerry Horton – guitar
- Tobin Esperance – bass
- Tony Palermo – drums

== Charts ==
=== Weekly charts ===
Weekly chart performance for "Help"
Chart (2017)	Peak position
Canada Rock (Billboard)	6
Czech Republic (Rádio – Top 100)	62
Czech Republic Rock (IFPI)	1
Finland (Suomen virallinen lista)	93
US Hot Rock & Alternative Songs (Billboard)	15
US Rock & Alternative Airplay (Billboard)	8

=== Year-end charts ===
Year-end chart performance for "Help"
Chart (2017)	Position
US Hot Rock Songs (Billboard)	45
US Rock Airplay (Billboard)	42

== Certifications ==
Certifications for "Help"
Region	Certification	Certified units/sales
Canada (Music Canada)	Gold	40,000^{‡}
New Zealand (RMNZ)	Gold	15,000^{‡}
United States (RIAA)	Gold	500,000^{‡}
^{‡} Sales+streaming figures based on certification alone.
