= Makeshift Love =

Single by Good Charlotte

from the album Youth Authority
- Released: November 5, 2015
- Recorded: Mid–2015
- Genre: Pop-punk
- Length: 3:45
- Label: MDDN
- Songwriter(s): Benji Madden; Joel Madden; John Feldmann; Nick Furlong

Good Charlotte singles chronology
"1979" (2011)	"Makeshift Love" (2015)	"40 oz. Dream" (2016)

"Makeshift Love" is a 2015 song from Good Charlotte's sixth studio album Youth Authority. The single was the first song by Good Charlotte after their return from a four-year hiatus. "Makeshift Love" was also the band's first ever song to reach the Billboard Hot Rock Songs chart.

== Background ==
After the release of their fifth studio album Cardiology, Good Charlotte announced in August 2011 that they would be going on hiatus. During this hiatus, Benji Madden and Joel Madden formed the band The Madden Brothers. They released a mixtape Before – Volume One in October 2011 and a 2014 studio album Greetings from California. In 2015, Good Charlotte decided to end their hiatus after co-producing albums with Sleeping with Sirens and 5 Seconds of Summer. When "Makeshift Love" was released in November 2015, it was the first single by Good Charlotte in four years since their hiatus.

== Composition ==
Benji Madden said "Makeshift Love" was "a 'non-break-up break-up song'" that had similar themes with their previous tracks.

== Release ==
On November 3, 2015, Good Charlotte released a snippet of "Makeshift Love". A few days later, "Makeshift Love" was released as a single on November 5 with a follow-up lyric video on November 6.

== Charts ==
"Makeshift Love" became Good Charlotte's first ever song to appear on the Billboard Hot Rock Songs chart. On Billboard, the song debuted at number 30.

== Reception ==
Much Music said the song sounded like previous Good Charlotte music from the 2000s.

== Music video ==
A preview music video was for "Makeshift Love" was made available on November 9, 2015, with a following full version uploaded on November 13. In the video, the band work at a breakup app company and features guest appearances by Waterparks, John Feldmann and Mikey Way.
