= Nicholas Furlong (musician) =

American musician, songwriter, and record producer

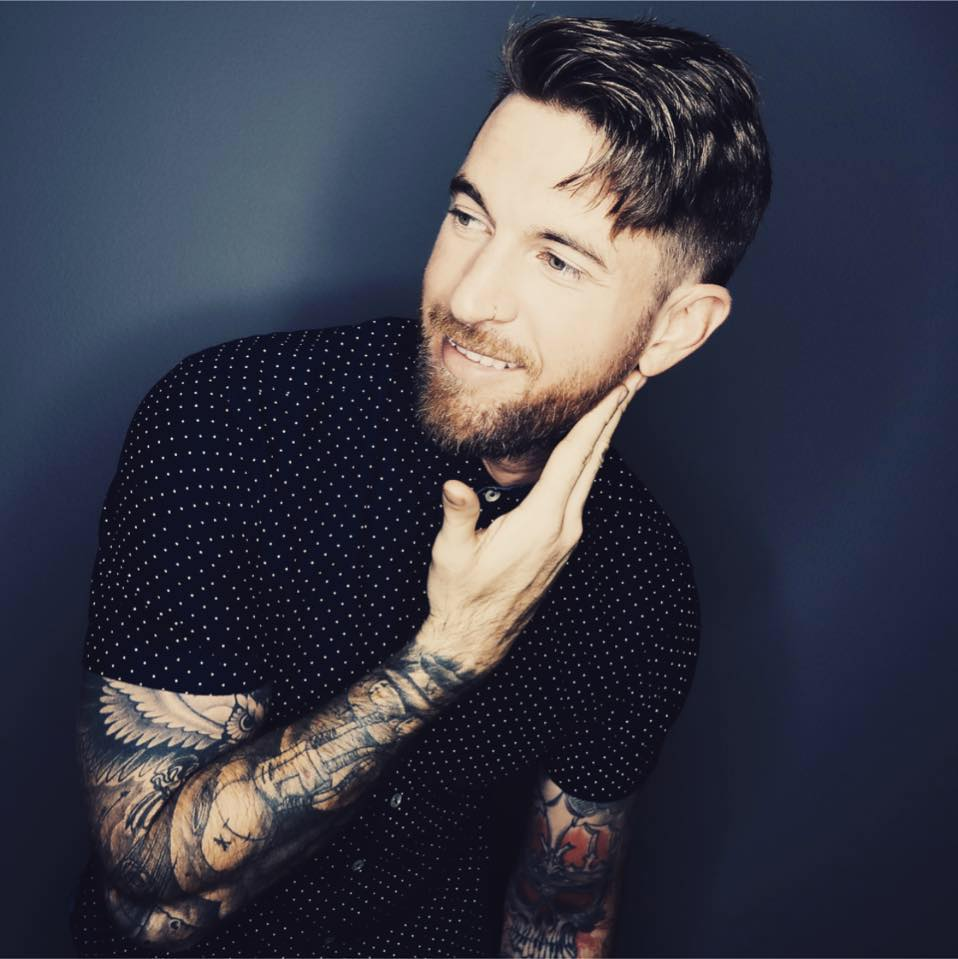

Background information
- Born: September 16, 1986 (age 39); Sacramento, California, U.S.
- Genres: Rock; pop; dance; hip hop; nu metal; rap rock
- Occupations: Singer; songwriter; rapper; record producer
- Years active: 2010–present
- Label: AttaBoy Music

Nicholas Furlong (born September 16, 1986), also known as RAS, is an American singer, songwriter, rapper, and record producer. His work crosses several musical genres, ranging from dance, rock, and pop, to rap and hip-hop. He is also the vocalist and co-writer of the hit single "The Nights" by Avicii.

Furlong was initially signed by songwriter and producer Ryan Tedder during the years of 2010–2011. Since 2012, he has worked with artists such as Kygo, Steve Aoki, 5 Seconds of Summer, Big Time Rush, Sabrina Carpenter, WALK THE MOON, All Time Low, blink-182, Travis Barker, Papa Roach, Carrie Underwood, the Used, Sleeping with Sirens, and Fever 333.

In 2019, he was nominated for a Grammy Award for Best Rock Performance, for his songwriting credit on Made an America by Fever 333.

== Early life ==
Furlong was born in Sacramento, California to Jennifer and Michael Furlong and raised in Carson City, Nevada. He is of English and Irish descent. At the age of 16, he began writing and recording his own songs and sharing them on music websites, before being discovered by a music director at Midway Games and being offered an opportunity to write music for video games. Furlong contributed to various game soundtracks in 2004–2005, including NBA Ballers, Blitz: The League, and NBA Ballers: Phenom. At the age of 21, he moved to Los Angeles to pursue a career as a songwriter and producer.

== Career ==
=== 2010–2013: Career breakthrough ===
Furlong had his first commercial success in 2010 as a co-writer of the Big Time Rush and Jordin Sparks' duet, "Count on You". The song was featured on the band's debut album BTR, which debuted at number three on the Billboard 200. Shortly after, Furlong signed a publishing deal with Ryan Tedder, where he worked with artists like Colbie Caillat, Jordin Sparks, Leona Lewis, and the Wanted. Furlong worked again with Big Time Rush in 2011, when he co-wrote "Time of Our Life" for their second album Elevate. The band shot a live music video for the song during the 2012 Nickelodeon Kids' Choice Awards, which premiered after the show.

In 2012, Furlong began transitioning into electronic music, after co-writing a song for Diplo's Express Yourself EP. "I'd always been a fan of dance music in general, but working on Diplo's project gave me a completely different perspective of the genre as a whole." Later that year, Furlong began collaborating with Steve Aoki, co-writing the single "Singularity". They would collaborate again in 2013, when Furlong wrote and featured as a vocalist on the single "Bring You to Life (Transcend)", which peaked at number 44 on the Billboard Dance/Electronic Songs chart. Furlong performed the song alongside Aoki at his 2013 concert in Los Angeles at the Shrine Exposition Hall, during which two Guinness World Records were set for "the longest scream by a crowd" and "most people simultaneously lighting glow sticks".

=== 2014–2015: Commercial recognition ===
Furlong worked with 5 Seconds of Summer in 2014 for their debut self-titled album, co-writing "Everything I Didn't Say", "Social Casualty", and "Independence Day". Despite not being released as a single, "Everything I Didn't Say" debuted at number 24 on the Billboard Hot 100. The song was also featured on the band's live album LiveSOS. Later that year, Furlong worked with post-hardcore band Sleeping with Sirens co-writing "Kick Me", the first single off of their fourth studio album, Madness. The single peaked at number 23 on the Billboard Hot Rock Songs chart. "Kick Me" won an award for song of the year at the 2015 Alternative Press Music Awards.

In 2015, Furlong began working with All Time Low on their sixth studio album Future Hearts, co-writing "Runaways" and "Don't You Go". The album was the highest-selling album worldwide its first week out, making it the band's highest debut ever. Later that year, Furlong co-wrote and co-produced "Game On", a song by Waka Flocka Flame featuring Good Charlotte, which served as the theme song of the Adam Sandler film Pixels. Pixels was released in 2D, 3D, and IMAX 3D on July 24, 2015. Furlong was also a co-writer on the Good Charlotte single "Makeshift Love", which debuted at number nine on the Billboard Rock chart. Variance Magazine claimed that 2015 was a "pivotal year" for the songwriter and producer.

=== Avicii single "The Nights" ===
Furlong co-wrote and performed vocals on Avicii's single "The Nights". The single premiered on the soundtrack of FIFA 15 on September 23, 2014. It was released on December 1, 2014, on The Days / Nights EP, alongside Avicii's prior single "The Days", and as a single in the UK on January 11, 2015. "The Nights" peaked at number one on the UK Dance Chart, number six on the UK Singles Chart, and number ten on the Billboard Dance/Electronic Songs chart. As of March 2022, the single has accumulated more than one billion streams on Spotify, making it the second most popular FIFA soundtrack song of all-time. Furlong sent the original idea, titled "My Father Told Me", to Arash Pournouri, Avicii's manager. Pournouri recognised an immediate draw to the track, saying that the song had that same sense of euphoria which characterises so much of Avicii's music. In an interview with Yahoo! Music, Pournouri said: "It made absolute sense to work on it with Nick...[Avicii and I just needed] to make it more 'us' and that's what [we] did."

Furlong contacted filmmaker Rory Kramer to use footage from Kramer's YouTube channel for the official music video, which was released on December 15, 2014, on YouTube. As of February 2023, the music video has over 900 million views.

=== 2016–present: AttaBoy Music ===
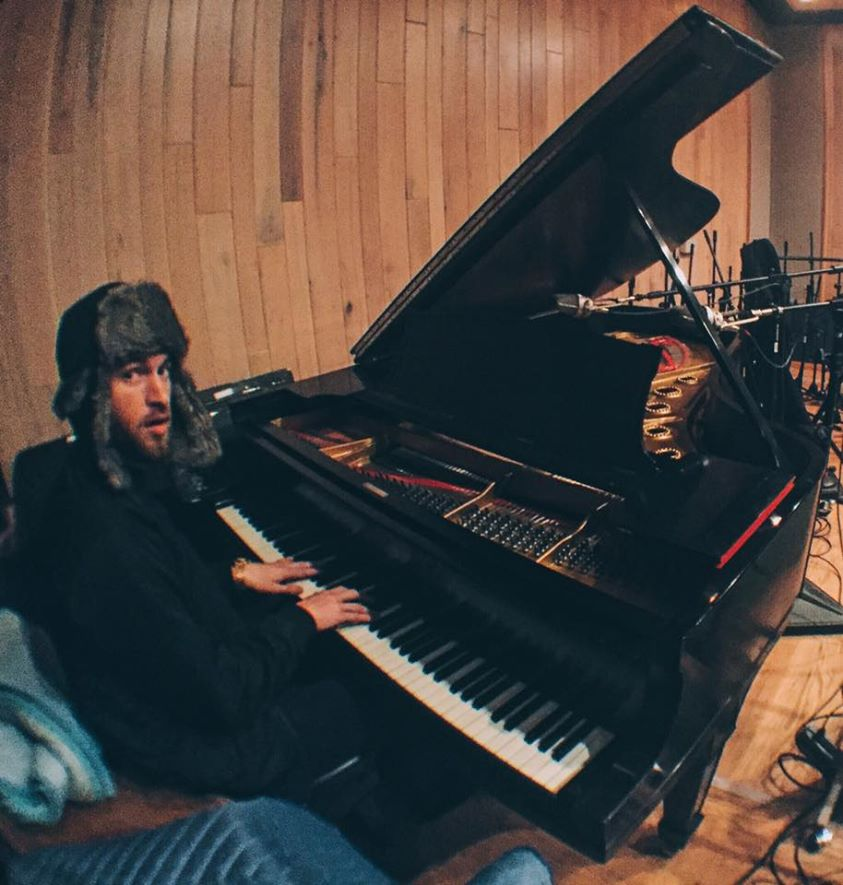
Furlong in 2016

In 2016, Furlong was brought on as executive producer, co-producer, and a songwriter for Papa Roach's ninth studio album, Crooked Teeth. The first single, titled "Help", was released February 17, 2017, and spent six consecutive weeks at number one on Billboard's Mainstream Rock Singles chart, making it the band's third number one Rock single in their career. The album's second single "American Dreams" reached number three on the charts. Furlong simultaneously co-produced and co-wrote several songs with All Time Low for their album Last Young Renegade, including the album's first single "Dirty Laundry", which reached No. 1 on the UK Rock Singles chart. Furlong is also credited as a co-writer on "Good Old Days" for blink-182's deluxe edition of their album California. On October 13, 2017, The Front Bottoms released Going Grey, produced and executive produced by Furlong.

Furlong worked with the politically charged rap-rock trio The Fever 333 in 2018, writing singles "Made an America", which was nominated for a Grammy Award for best rock performance, and "Burn It", which won the best song at the 2019 Kerrang! Awards. He also contributed as a songwriter to Logan Henderson's single "Pull Me Deep", which was the artist's first single to debut on the Billboard Top 40 chart. In 2019 Furlong was credited as a co-writer on several songs from 311's album Voyager. He also launched his own joint venture publishing company AttaBoy Music with Reach Global Publishing.

In 2020, Furlong and Nicholas Petricca of WALK THE MOON wrote the song "Someday", a collaboration between Kygo and country artist Zac Brown, and "Supremacy" by The Fever 333, which was co-produced with John Feldmann and Travis Barker and interpolates the song "Rapture" by Blondie, listing Debbie Harry and Chris Stein as co-writers. In addition, he also co-wrote and produced "Hanging with Ghosts" by Yung Pinch featuring Good Charlotte and Goody Grace.

Furlong revealed his own project, The Dirty Rich, on September 14, 2020. The first single, titled "Hot American Summer", was released on September 28, 2020, via Furlong's independent record label AttaBoy Music. In 2021, the label also released an official remix of the single "Vacation" by Dirty Heads, and two singles titled "Grey Skies" and "5AM" by Betcha.

In 2022, Furlong was the executive producer, co-producer, and co-writer of Papa Roach's eleventh studio album, Ego Trip. The album's singles "Kill The Noise" and "No Apologies" both reached No. 1 on the Billboard Mainstream Rock Singles chart. He also co-produced and co-wrote three singles by Big Time Rush titled "Call It Like I See It", "Not Giving You Up", and "Fall".

== Discography ==
=== Production and songwriting credits ===
Year	Artist	Title	Album	Credits
2026	The Paradox	"I Kinda Like That"	Proceed With Caution – EP	Songwriter, vocal producer
2026	The Paradox	"Good For Me"	Proceed With Caution – EP	Songwriter, vocal producer
2026	The Paradox	"Stoner Mentality"	Proceed With Caution – EP	Songwriter, vocal producer
2026	The Paradox	"That's Not Fair"	Proceed With Caution – EP	Songwriter, producer, vocal producer
2026	The Paradox	"Living Hell"	Proceed With Caution – EP	Vocal producer
2026	Said The Sky & Jutes	"Spiral"	Salt & Silence	Songwriter
2025	Big Time Rush	"I Want You Here All The Time"	I Want You Here All The Time – Single	Songwriter, producer
2025	Jutes	"Fly on the Wall"	Dilworth	Songwriter
2025	Jutes	"Eulogy"	Dilworth	Songwriter
2025	The Paradox	"Bender" (feat. Travis Barker)	NSFW – EP	Songwriter
2025	The Paradox	"No Strings Attached"	NSFW – EP	Songwriter
2025	People R Ugly	"SLEEP TALKING"	GARAGE	Executive producer (album), songwriter
2025	People R Ugly	"DAYLIGHT / TURN ME ON"	GARAGE	Executive producer (album), songwriter
2025	People R Ugly	"WAKE UP"	GARAGE	Executive producer (album), songwriter
2025	People R Ugly	"THINKIN BOUT YOU"	GARAGE	Executive producer (album), songwriter
2025	People R Ugly	"STUPID"	GARAGE	Executive producer (album), songwriter
2025	People R Ugly	"PUNCHING BAG"	GARAGE	Executive producer (album), songwriter
2025	People R Ugly	"BETTER"	GARAGE	Executive producer (album), songwriter
2025	People R Ugly	"OUTSIDE INTERLUDE"	GARAGE	Executive producer (album), songwriter
2025	People R Ugly	"OUTSIDE FREESTYLE"	GARAGE	Executive producer (album), songwriter
2025	People R Ugly	"F#€K IT (I'LL BE OKAY)"	GARAGE	Executive producer (album), songwriter
2025	People R Ugly	"EL CAMINO" (feat. Jakob Nowell)	GARAGE	Executive producer (album), songwriter
2025	Purple Disco Machine	"Next To You" (feat. Taranteeno)	Paradise (Bonus Edition)	Songwriter
2025	Shwayze	"Bartender (Hit Me With Your Best Shot"	Wasted Sunset	Songwriter, producer
2025	Shwayze	"Way Down" (feat. O.A.R.)	Wasted Sunset	Songwriter, producer
2025	Silverstein	"Dying Game"	Pink Moon	Songwriter
2025	Vicetone	"Won't Let You Go" (feat. Jaden Michaels & Nick Furlong)	Won't Let You Go – Single	Lead vocals, songwriter, producer
2024	AR/CO & Don Diablo	"Solar Eclipse"	Solar Eclipse – Single	Songwriter
2024	Charlotte Sands	"die in this room"	can we start over?	Songwriter, producer
2024	Connor Kauffman	"Pink Little Lighter"	Two Hearts	Songwriter, producer
2024	FEVER 333	"BULL & A BULLET"	DARKER WHITE	Songwriter
2024	FEVER 333	"PIN DROP"	DARKER WHITE	Songwriter
2024	Iian Rich	"CHOKEHOLD"	CHOKEHOLD – Single	Songwriter
2024	Lindsey Stirling	"Survive" (feat. Walk Off The Earth)	Duality	Songwriter
2024	Oliver Cronin	"Hello Goodbye"	Hello Goodbye – Single	Songwriter
2024	People R Ugly	"Church On TV"	Church On TV – Single	Songwriter, producer
2024	People R Ugly	"Dumb"	Dumb – Single	Songwriter, producer
2024	People R Ugly	"Just Friends"	Just Friends – Single	Songwriter
2024	Papa Roach & Carrie Underwood	"Leave A Light On (Talk Away The Dark)"	Leave A Light On (Talk Away The Dark – Single	Songwriter, producer
2024	Tech N9ne	"Sin Miedo" (feat. Zkeircrow, G-Mo Skee, & Phlaque The Grimstress)	COSM	Songwriter, producer
2024	Unroyal	"Ten Feet Tall"	Ten Feet Tall – Single	Songwriter
2023	Atreyu	"Drowning"	Drowning – Single	Songwriter
2023	Betcha	"Trippin"	Trippin – Single	Songwriter, producer
2023	Big Time Rush	"I Just Want To (Party All The Time)"	Another Life	Songwriter, producer
2023	Big Time Rush	"Weekends"	Another Life	Songwriter
2023	Big Time Rush	"Forget You Now"	Another Life	Songwriter
2023	Big Time Rush	"Ask You Tonight"	Another Life	Songwriter
2023	Big Time Rush	"Another Life"	Another Life	Songwriter, producer
2023	Big Time Rush	"Learn To Love"	Another Life – Deluxe	Songwriter, producer
2023	Cassadee Pope	"Almost There"	Almost There – Single	Songwriter, producer
2023	The Front Bottoms	"Clear Path"	You Are Who You Hang Out With	Songwriter
2023	The Front Bottoms	"Not Joking"	You Are Who You Hang Out With	Songwriter
2023	Jutes	"Quitter"	LADYBUG	Songwriter
2023	Morgan Page & farfetch'd	"Runaway" (feat. The Dirty Rich)	Runaway – Single	Songwriter, lead vocals
2023	People R Ugly	"Get Over It"	People R Ugly – EP	Executive producer (album), songwriter, producer
2023	People R Ugly	"Deep End"	People R Ugly – EP	Executive producer (album), songwriter, producer
2023	People R Ugly	"What's Up"; 4 Non Blondes Cover	What's Up – Single	Producer
2023	Summer Rios	"The Long Way"	The Long Way – Single	Songwriter
2022	Big Time Rush	"Fall"	Fall – Single	Songwriter
2022	Big Time Rush	"Not Giving You Up"	Not Giving You Up – Single	Songwriter, producer
2022	Goldfinger	"3am"	Never Look Back (Deluxe)	Songwriter
2022	Mothica	"Casualty"	nocturnal	Songwriter
2022	Papa Roach	"Bloodline"	Ego Trip	Executive producer (album), songwriter, producer
2022	Papa Roach	"Ego Trip"	Ego Trip	Executive producer (album), songwriter, producer
2022	Papa Roach	"Unglued"	Ego Trip	Executive producer (album), songwriter, producer
2022	Papa Roach	"Killing Time"	Ego Trip	Executive producer (album), songwriter, producer
2022	Papa Roach	"Leave A Light On"	Ego Trip	Executive producer (album), songwriter, producer
2022	Papa Roach	"Always Wandering"	Ego Trip	Executive producer (album), songwriter, producer
2022	Papa Roach	"No Apologies"	Ego Trip	Executive producer (album), songwriter, producer
2022	Papa Roach	"Cut The Line"	Ego Trip	Executive producer (album), songwriter, producer
2022	Papa Roach	"I Surrender"	Ego Trip	Executive producer (album), songwriter, producer
2022	Sleeping With Sirens	"Grave"	Complete Collapse	Songwriter
2022	Story of The Year	"Take The Ride"	Tear Me To Pieces	Songwriter
2022	The Summer Set	"Hard Candy"	blossom	Songwriter
2021	Atreyu	"Stay"	Baptize	Songwriter
2021	Betcha	"Grey Skies"	Grey Skies – Single	Songwriter, producer
2021	Big Time Rush	"Call It Like I See It"	Call It Like I See It – Single	Songwriter, producer
2021	Concrete Castles	"Wish I Missed U" (feat. Anthony Green)	Wish I Missed U	Songwriter
2021	Devin Dawson	"Not On My Watch"	The Pink Slip – EP	Songwriter
2021	Dirty Heads	"Vacation (AttaBoy Remix)"	Vacation – AttaBoy Remix	Producer
2021	Forester	"The Flood"	The Flood – Single	Songwriter
2021	guardin	"all i can see"	all i can see – Single	Songwriter, producer
2021	Jena Rose	"Check Mate"	Check Mate – Single	Songwriter
2021	Jesse Clegg	"Waiting On The Outcome"	Waiting On The Outcome – Single	Songwriter, producer
2021	Nathan James	"Appetite"	Appetite – Single	Songwriter, producer
2021	Papa Roach	"SWERVE" (feat. Jason Aalon Butler of Fever 333 & Sueco)	SWERVE – Single	Songwriter, producer
2020	Betcha	"July"	July – Single	Songwriter, producer
2020	Felly	"Love and Fear"	Mariposa	Songwriter, producer
2020	Fever 333	"Supremacy"	Wrong Generation	Songwriter, producer
2020	Hogland	"Scars" (feat. Wiktoria)	Scars – Single	Songwriter, producer
2020	The Hunna	"Cover You" (feat. Travis Barker)	I'd Rather Die Than Let You In	Songwriter
2020	Jesse Clegg	"Speed of Light"	Speed of Light – Single	Songwriter, producer
2020	Kygo	"Say You Will" (feat. Patrick Droney and Petey)	Golden Hour	Songwriter
2020	Kygo	"Someday" (feat. Zac Brown)	Golden Hour	Songwriter, producer
2020	No Love For The Middle Child	"Walk Away" (feat. American Teeth)	Walk Away – EP	Songwriter
2020	Stray Kids	"We Go" (feat. Bang Chan, Changbin, & HAN)	In Life (Repackage)	Songwriter
2020	Yung Pinch	"Hanging With Ghosts" (feat. Goody Grace & Good Charlotte)	Back 2 The Beach	Songwriter, producer
2019	311	"Space and Time"	Voyager	Songwriter
2019	311	"What The?!"	Voyager	Songwriter
2019	311	"Dodging Raindrops"	Voyager	Songwriter
2019	311	"Lucid Dreams"	Voyager	Songwriter
2019	Dinosaur Pile-Up	"Pouring Gasoline"	Celebrity Mansions	Songwriter
2019	Fever 333	"Burn It"	Strength in Numb333rs	Songwriter
2019	Hero The Band	"Trouble in My Mind"	Back To Myself – EP	Songwriter, producer
2019	New Politics	"Suspension"	An Invitation to an Alternate Reality	Songwriter
2019	Papa Roach	"The Ending"	Who Do You Trust?	Executive producer (album), songwriter, producer
2019	Papa Roach	"Renegade Music"	Who Do You Trust?	Executive producer (album), songwriter, producer
2019	Papa Roach	"Not The Only One"	Who Do You Trust?	Executive producer (album), songwriter, producer
2019	Papa Roach	"Who Do You Trust?"	Who Do You Trust?	Executive producer (album), songwriter, producer
2019	Papa Roach	"Elevate"	Who Do You Trust?	Executive producer (album), songwriter, producer
2019	Papa Roach	"Come Around"	Who Do You Trust?	Executive producer (album), songwriter, producer
2019	Papa Roach	"Feel Like Home"	Who Do You Trust?	Executive producer (album), songwriter, producer
2019	Papa Roach	"Problems"	Who Do You Trust?	Executive producer (album), songwriter, producer
2019	Papa Roach	"I Suffer Well"	Who Do You Trust?	Executive producer (album), songwriter, producer
2019	Papa Roach	"Maniac"	Who Do You Trust?	Executive producer (album), songwriter, producer
2019	Papa Roach	"Better Than Life"	Who Do You Trust?	Executive producer (album), songwriter, producer
2019	Stray Kids	"Double Knot"	Clé: Levanter	Songwriter
2019	Stray Kids	"Double Knot" (Japanese Version)	SKZ2020	Songwriter
2019	The Used	"Blow Me" (feat. Jason Aalon Butler)	Heartwork	Songwriter
2018	Basement	"Slip Away"	Beside Myself	Songwriter, producer
2018	Fever 333	"Made An America"	Made An America	Songwriter
2018	Fever 333	"POV"	Made An America	Songwriter
2018	Fever 333	"Made An America (Remix)" (feat. Travis Barker & Vic Mensa)		Songwriter
2018	Logan Henderson	"Pull Me Deep"	Pull Me Deep – Single	Songwriter
2018	Logan Henderson	"Intro"	Echoes of Departure and The Endless Street of Dreams Pt. I	Executive producer (album), songwriter, producer
2018	Logan Henderson	"Sleepwalker"	Echoes of Departure and The Endless Street of Dreams Pt. I	Executive producer (album), songwriter, producer
2018	Logan Henderson	"Bite My Tongue"	Echoes of Departure and The Endless Street of Dreams Pt. I	Executive producer (album), songwriter, producer
2018	Logan Henderson	"Speak of The Devil"	Echoes of Departure and The Endless Street of Dreams Pt. I	Executive producer (album), songwriter, producer
2018	Logan Henderson	"Take It Out On Me"	Echoes of Departure and The Endless Street of Dreams Pt. I	Executive producer (album), songwriter, producer
2018	Logan Henderson	"Evergreen"	Echoes of Departure and The Endless Street of Dreams Pt. I	Executive producer (album), songwriter, producer
2018	Logan Henderson	"Generations"	Echoes of Departure and The Endless Street of Dreams Pt. I	Executive producer (album), songwriter, producer
2017	All Time Low	"Dirty Laundry"	Last Young Renegade	Songwriter, producer
2017	All Time Low	"Nice2KnoU"	Last Young Renegade	Songwriter, producer
2017	All Time Low	"Nightmares"	Last Young Renegade	Songwriter, producer
2017	All Time Low	"Afterglow"	Last Young Renegade	Songwriter, producer
2017	blink-182	"Good Old Days"	California (Deluxe Edition)	Songwriter
2017	The Front Bottoms	"You Used To Say (Holy Fuck)"	Going Grey	Songwriter, producer
2017	The Front Bottoms	"Peace Sign"	Going Grey	Songwriter, producer
2017	The Front Bottoms	"Vacation Town"	Going Grey	Songwriter, producer
2017	The Front Bottoms	"Grand Finale"	Going Grey	Songwriter, producer
2017	The Front Bottoms	"Trampoline"	Going Grey	Songwriter, producer
2017	The Front Bottoms	"Far Drive"	Going Grey	Songwriter, producer
2017	The Front Bottoms	"Everyone But You"	Going Grey	Songwriter, producer
2017	The Front Bottoms	"Ocean"	Going Grey	Songwriter, producer
2017	Krewella	"Dead AF"	—	Songwriter, producer
2017	Onyx	"Problem Child"	Silicon Valley: The Soundtrack	Songwriter, producer
2017	Papa Roach	"Break The Fall"	Crooked Teeth	Executive producer (album), songwriter, producer
2017	Papa Roach	"Crooked Teeth"	Crooked Teeth	Executive producer (album), songwriter, producer
2017	Papa Roach	"My Medication"	Crooked Teeth	Executive producer (album), songwriter, producer
2017	Papa Roach	"American Dreams"	Crooked Teeth	Executive producer (album), songwriter, producer
2017	Papa Roach	"Periscope" (feat. Skylar Grey)	Crooked Teeth	Executive producer (album), songwriter, producer
2017	Papa Roach	"Help"	Crooked Teeth	Executive producer (album), songwriter, producer
2017	Papa Roach	"Sunrise Trailer Park" (feat. Machine Gun Kelly)	Crooked Teeth	Executive producer (album), songwriter, producer
2017	Papa Roach	"Traumatic	Crooked Teeth	Executive producer (album), songwriter, producer
2017	Papa Roach	"None of The Above"	Crooked Teeth	Executive producer (album), songwriter, producer
2017	Sabrina Carpenter	"Why" (Acoustic Version)	Why (Acoustic)	Producer
2016	Krewella	"Marching On"	Ammunition – EP	Songwriter
2016	Steve Aoki	"Back 2 U" (feat. WALK THE MOON)	Back 2 U – Single	Songwriter, producer
2016	Steve Aoki	"Can't Go Home" (feat. Adam Lambert)	Can't Go Home – Single	Vocal producer
2016	Steve Aoki	"Feel (The Power of Now)"	Feel (The Power of Now) – Single	Songwriter
2015	All Time Low	"Runaways"	Future Hearts	Songwriter
2015	All Time Low	"Don't You Go"	Future Hearts	Songwriter
2015	Disturbed	"Open Your Eyes"	Immortalized	Songwriter
2015	Good Charlotte	"Makeshift Love"	Youth Authority	Songwriter
2015	Jake Miller	"Selfish Girls"	Rumors – EP	Songwriter
2015	ListenBee	"Save Me"	Save Me – Single	Songwriter
2015	ONE OK ROCK	"Paper Planes" (feat. Kellin Quinn)	35XXXV	Songwriter
2015	Sleeping With Sirens	"Kick Me"	Madness	Songwriter
2015	Sleeping With Sirens	"Better Off Dead"	Madness	Songwriter
2015	Sleeping With Sirens	"November"	Madness	Songwriter
2015	Steve Aoki	"Light Years" (feat. Rivers Cuomo)	Neon Future II	Songwriter, additional vocals
2015	Timeflies	"Burn It Down"	Just For Fun	Songwriter
2015	Waka Flocka Flame	"Game On" (feat. Good Charlotte)	Pixels (Motion Picture Soundtrack)	Songwriter, producer
2015	Iyaz	"Believe In Love"	Aurora	Songwriter
2014	Avicii	"The Nights"	The Days / Nights EP - Stories (UK and Japan Versions)	Songwriter, lead vocals
2014	Heffron Drive	"Could You Be Home" (RAS Remix)	Happy Mistakes	Producer
2014	Issues	"Disappear"	Diamond Dreams	Producer
2014	5 Seconds of Summer	"Everything I Didn't Say"	5 Seconds of Summer	Songwriter
2014	5 Seconds of Summer	"Social Casualty"	5 Seconds of Summer	Songwriter
2014	5 Seconds of Summer	"Independence Day"	5 Seconds of Summer	Songwriter
2013	Makua Rothman	"Underneath The Halo"	Sound Wave	Songwriter
2013	Makua Rothman	"The Nite B4"	Sound Wave	Songwriter
2013	Kay	"Next To You"	My Name Is Kay	Songwriter, producer
2013	Kay	"It's Over"	My Name Is Kay	Songwriter, producer
2013	Steve Aoki	"Bring You To Life (Transcend)"	Bring You To Life (Transcend) – Single	Songwriter, lead vocals
2012	Diplo	"No Problem" (feat. Flinch and Kay)	Express Yourself – EP	Songwriter
2012	Steve Aoki	"Singularity" (feat. Kay)	It's The End of The World As We Know It – EP	Songwriter, vocal producer
2011	Big Time Rush	"Time of Our Life"	Elevate	Songwriter
2011	Stan Walker	"Won't Let You Down"	Let The Music Play	Songwriter, producer
2011	The Wanted	"Satellite"	The Wanted	Vocal producer
2010	Big Time Rush	"Count On You" (feat. Jordin Sparks)	BTR	Songwriter
2010	Burnham	"Automatic"	Almost Famous – EP	Co-writer
2010	Chingy	"Superhero"	Superhero – Single	Songwriter, vocals
2010	Colbie Caillat	"Brighter Than The Sun"	All of You	Vocal producer
2010	Jordin Sparks	"I Am Woman"	I Am Woman – Single	Vocal producer
2010	Jordin Sparks	"The World I Knew"	African Cats (Motion Picture Soundtrack)	Vocal producer
2010	Justice Crew	"And Then We Dance"	And Then We Dance – Single	Songwriter, producer
2010	Murphy Lee	"Hit The Floor" (feat. Nelly, City Spud, Kyjuan & Ali)	You See Me	Songwriter, lead vocals

=== As The Dirty Rich ===
Year	Title	Album	Credit
2020	"Hot American Summer"	Hot American Summer – Single	Vocals, songwriter, producer, all instruments

== Awards and nominations ==
Year	Award	Title	Category	Result
2025	Clio Music Awards	Leave A Light On (Talk Away The Dark)	Social Good Award	Won
2024	AFSP Lifesavers Gala	Public Education Lifesavers Award	Honoree	Won
2021	Billboard Music Awards	Golden Hour	Dance/Electronic Album	Nominated
2019	Kerrang! Awards	"Burn It"	Best Song	Won
2019	61st Annual Grammy Awards	"Made An America"	Best Rock Performance	Nominated
2018	iHeartRadio Music Awards	"Help"	Rock Song of the Year	Nominated
2017	Loudwire Music Awards	Crooked Teeth	Hard Rock Album of the Year	Nominated
2017	Rock Sound Awards	Last Young Renegade	Album of the Year	Won
2015	Alternative Press Music Awards	"Kick Me"	Song of the Year	Won
