= Cut the Line =

Single by Papa Roach

from the album Ego Trip
- Released: March 1, 2022
- Recorded: 2020
- Genre: Pop-punk
- Length: 3:29
- Label: New Noize

Papa Roach singles chronology
| "Stand Up" (2022) | "Cut the Line" (2022) | "No Apologies" (2023) |

Music video
- "Cut the Line" on YouTube

"Cut the Line" is a song by American rock band Papa Roach. Originally released as a promotional song ahead of the release of the eleventh studio album Ego Trip in March 2022, an alternative version of the song featuring Caleb Shomo of the band Beartooth was released in early 2023 in promotion of the expanded edition of the album. The latter version peaked at number one on the Billboard Mainstream Rock Songs chart in 2023.

== Background ==
"Cut the Line" was first recorded in 2020, as part of the recording sessions that lead to the band's eleventh studio album, Ego Trip. The song was one of a number of promotional songs released ahead of the album's April 2022 release, releasing on March 1, 2022. An accompanying music video featuring the band performing the song in a garage, released on March 4. "Cut the Line" was placed as the penultimate track on the album upon Ego Trip's release on April 8, 2022.

In January 2023, the band announced a deluxe edition release of Ego Trip, featuring new versions of songs featuring collaborations with other artists. To promote the re-release, the band released a new version of the track "Cut the Line", featuring new guest vocals by Caleb Shomo of the band Beartooth. The new release pushed the song onto the Billboard Mainstream Rock Songs chart in March 2023, peaking at number one.

== Themes and composition ==
Rock Sound described the track as a "hard-hitting and riff-fuelled banger" with Shomo's additions "adding so much more intensity to the tune, ripping and tearing like his life depends on it". Loudwire compared it to their track "Last Resort", interpreting the song to be about wrestling with one's anxieties and mental health, calling it "cathartic...rallying cry for those keeping things buried inside". Clash similarly compared the song to the band's output in the 2000s.

== Reception ==
Wall of Sound praised the collaboration, stating "Both Jacoby Shaddix and Shomo bounce off each other with a musicianship unlike no other. The new edition shows what happens when two iconic bands join forces with the end result being a surprise hit for fans alike".

== Personnel ==
- Jacoby Shaddix – lead vocals
- Jerry Horton – guitar
- Tobin Esperance – bass
- Tony Palermo – drums
- Caleb Shomo – guest vocals (2023 version)

== Charts ==
=== Weekly charts ===
Weekly chart performance for "Cut the Line"
| Chart (2022–23) | Peak position |
|---|---|
| Canada Rock (Billboard) | 30 |
| US Hot Hard Rock Songs (Billboard) | 19 |
| US Rock Airplay (Billboard) | 10 |
| US Mainstream Rock (Billboard) | 1 |

=== Year-end charts ===
Year-end chart performance for "Cut the Line"
| Chart (2023) | Position |
|---|---|
| US Mainstream Rock (Billboard) | 28 |
