= Jesse Clegg =

South African musician and singer

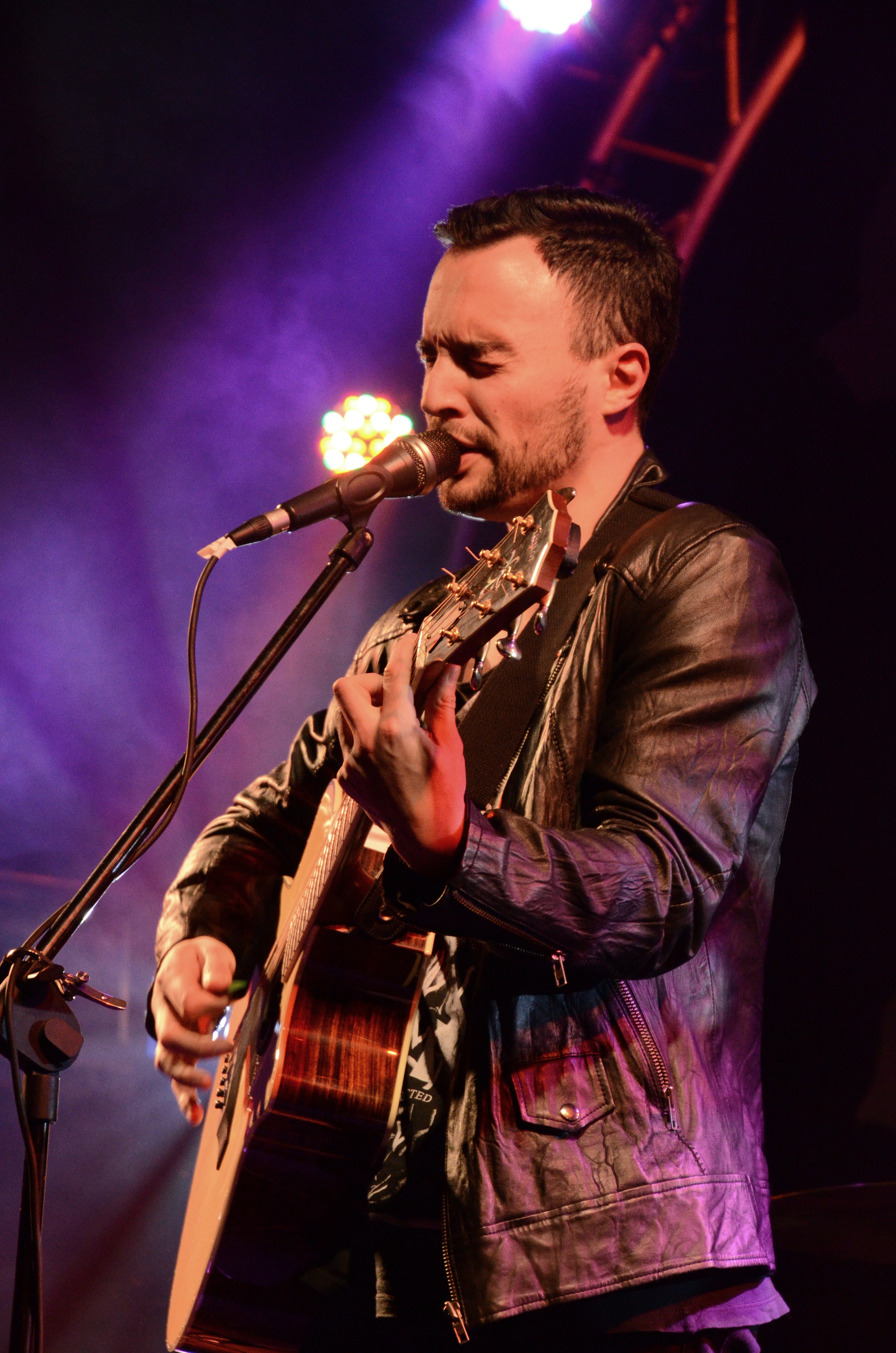
- Jesse Clegg performing live

Background information
- Born: Jesse Umpiyezwe Clegg; Johannesburg, South Africa
- Genres: Pop; alternative
- Occupations: Singer-songwriter; musician
- Instruments: Vocals; guitar; piano
- Years active: 2008–present
- Website: jesseclegg.com

Jesse Clegg is a platinum-selling South African singer-songwriter with five SAMA (South African Music Award) nominations. He's released multiple chart-topping radio singles. His albums include When I Wake Up (2008), Life on Mars – a collaboration with Grammy-winning Canadian producer David Bottrill (2011) – and Things Unseen (2016). Since 2016, he has consistently released charting singles every year with Grammy-winning US producer Tim Pagnotta, which will be forming his upcoming fourth album recorded in Los Angeles and New York.

== Biography ==
The son of Johnny Clegg, Jesse spent the first six years of his life on tour with his father. Jesse was raised in a household that incorporated both Jewish and Zulu cultural influences. While his upbringing was not religious, he occasionally observed the Sabbath and celebrated his Bar Mitzvah at the age of thirteen.

Over his career, Jesse has toured extensively in South Africa, the USA and the UK, including performances at Isle of Wight Festival in the UK and Radio City Music Hall, in New York City. He has also performed as the main support artist for international tours including Joan Armatrading, Daughtry and Imagine Dragons.

Further, Jesse Clegg has collaborated with a premium list of artists including Shekhinah, Walk the Moon, Msaki, Kentphonik, Autumn Rowe and DJ Kent.

== Recent highlights ==
In 2023, Jesse Clegg was the main support act for Imagine Dragons on their 2023 stadium tour to more than 130 000 people in South Africa. He also performed with platinum selling US pop band Walk The Moon at Ashley For The Arts Festival in Wisconsin, USA to an audience of 60 000 people. In early 2026 Jesse Clegg was featured by South African Musical (Zulu) genius Sjava on a song call kuye from his latest album titled Inkanyezi Nezinkanyezi.

He performed a special event for the Springbok rugby team as part of their homecoming tour after their win at the Rugby World Cup in 2023.

That same year, Clegg released chart-topping single Called To Hear Your Voice to critical and commercial acclaim. The song was recorded in LA with grammy-winner Tim Pagnotta.

In 2024 he released the single "Home" featuring Msaki and Grammy-winning Autumn Rowe (songwriter on Jon Batiste's We Are - 2023 Grammy's Album of the Year). The three of them performed the song together at multiple events during the course of the year.

Jesse Clegg's special performances at the prestigious Teatro Theatre in 2022 and 2023 were milestone events taking his fans on a journey through his broad catalogue of hits. It also featured both local and international guests joining him on stage (Msaki, Nicholas Petricca of WALK THE MOON, Zolani Mahola, Arno Carstens, Johannesburg Youth Orchestra). These shows were critically acclaimed and are set become an annual event.

On 29 October 2024, Jesse Clegg headlined alongside Zolani Mahola at Carnegie Hall.

Jesse has a daughter, Mylah, who was born in 2021, with his former partner Dani Cooperman. He was with Dani for almost 12 years. Dani passed away in 2022 from colon cancer.

On 12 September 2026, Jesse performed the South African national anthem for the Springboks at the Rugby's Greatest Rivalry tournament, which saw the Springboks playing the All Blacks in Baltimore, USA.

== Discography ==
=== Albums ===
- When I Wake Up (2008)
- Life on Mars (2011)
- Jesse Clegg Live & Unplugged (2012)
- Things Unseen (2016)
