= Hogland (musician) =

Swedish DJ

- Born: Linus Höglund; 25 March 1997 (age 29); Stockholm, Sweden
- Occupations: record producer; DJ; songwriter; musician; remixer
- Musical career
- Genres: EDM; tropical house; future house; dance-pop; progressive house
- Years active: 2015–present
- Label: TGR
- Website: hoglandmusic.com

Linus Höglund (born 25 March 1997), better known as Hogland, is a Swedish music producer, DJ and songwriter.

He started his career in 2015 with his first song "The Night", which placed itself in the top 3 of the Swedish Spotify Viral 50 list. During the summer of 2019, he released the song "Letting Go" together with the singer KIDDO. The song reached the Swedish Top 50 Chart on Spotify as well as reaching Sverigetopplistan for a total of 13 weeks. "Letting Go" gained international attention when Kygo started to play the song during his own gigs. Hogland has now amassed over 130 million streams on Spotify, and has been IFPI certifield gold in Sweden.

== Discography ==
Singles

Year	Title	Featured	Certifications
2015	"The Night"	Johnning	
2016	"Getaway"		
2016	"2 Young 2 Die"	Johnning	
2017	"Got You Babe"	Vinil	
2017	"We Don't Care"	Vinil, AVA	
2017	"Obsessed"	Jobe	
2017	"Ruled the World"	Jobe	
2017	"The Edge"	Lucas Estrada, G Curtis	
2018	"Someone New"	Nora Hedin	
2018	"Better Runaway"	Vinil, Johnning	
2018	"Missed Call"	Tanjent	
2018	"Over You"	Jazz Mino	
2018	"All Alone"		
2019	"Letting Go"	KIDDO	IFPI SWE: Gold
2019	"Cross My Heart"	Philip Strand	
2019	"Only You"	Bryan Finaly	
2020	"Without Wings"	KIDDO	
2020	"Just a Little"	Melanie Wehbe	
2020	"Scars"	Wiktoria	
2021	"Holy"	Charlie South	
