= Jerry Horton =

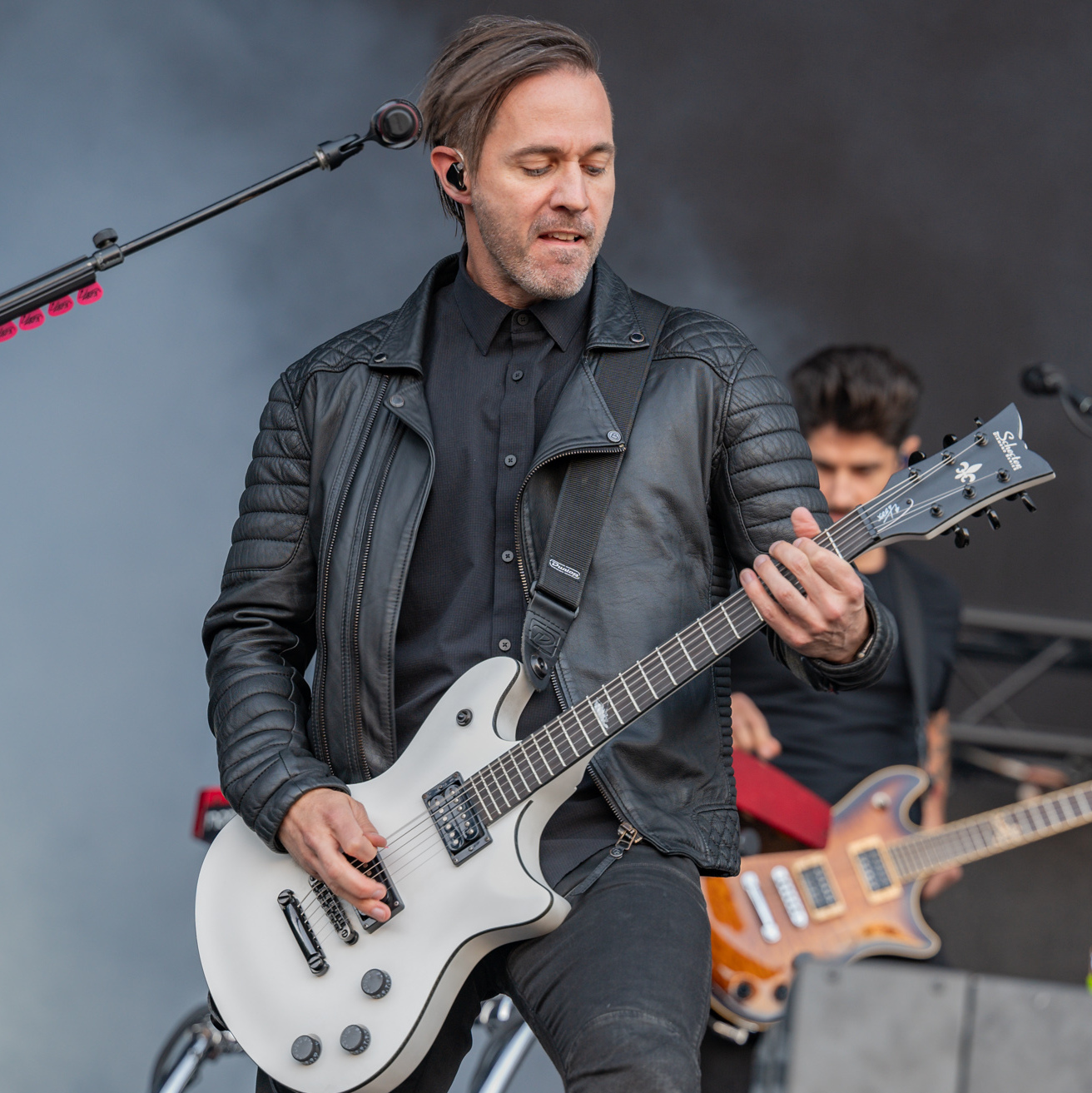
- Horton playing at Rock im Park in 2023

Background information
- Born: Jerry Allan Horton; March 10, 1975 (age 51); Charleston, South Carolina, U.S.
- Origin: Fairfield, California, U.S.
- Genres: Alternative rock; hard rock; alternative metal; nu metal; rapcore; punk rock
- Occupations: Musician; songwriter
- Instruments: Guitar; vocals
- Years active: 1993–present
- Website: paparoach.com

Jerry Allan Horton (born March 10, 1975) is an American musician who is the lead guitarist and backing vocalist and founding member of Californian rock band Papa Roach.

Some journalists consider him to be among the best nu metal guitarists of all time.

== Biography ==
Jerry Horton was born in Charleston, South Carolina on March 10, 1975. He has one brother named Chad. He began playing the guitar at the age of 14. Before joining Papa Roach, Horton worked as a roofer. He was introduced to the band by an ex-girlfriend and soon joined Ben Luther as the lead guitarist of the band. Horton has been nominated twice as best guitarist for the Californian Music Awards. Horton follows a straight edge lifestyle but does not identify himself with its subculture.
