= The Paramour Sessions =

Studio album by Papa Roach
- Released: September 12, 2006
- Recorded: December 2005 – May 2006
- Studios: Paramour Mansion (Hollywood, California)
- Genres: Hard rock; alternative rock
- Length: 48:20
- Label: Geffen
- Producer: Howard Benson

Papa Roach chronology
Getting Away With Murder (2004)	The Paramour Sessions (2006)	Hit 3 Pack: Forever (2007)

Singles from The Paramour Sessions
- 1. "...To Be Loved" Released: August 8, 2006; 2. "Forever" Released: January 10, 2007; 3. "Time Is Running Out" Released: July 24, 2007; 4. "Reckless" Released: 2007

Alternative cover
- Deluxe edition

Professional ratings
Review scores
Source	Rating
AllMusic	2.5/5 stars
IGN	7.5/10
MusicOMH	3/5 stars
PopMatters	4/10
Rolling Stone	2.5/5 stars

The Paramour Sessions is the fifth studio album and fourth major-label by American rock band Papa Roach. It was released on September 12, 2006, through Geffen Records. Following up from their fourth album Getting Away with Murder, the album confirmed the band's move from nu metal to an alternative rock and hard rock sound. The Paramour Sessions peaked at number 16 on the Billboard 200. A deluxe version of the album was released on June 12, 2007. It is the final album to feature the Infest era lineup.

== Background ==
The album's name is a reference to Paramour Mansion, where the album was recorded. Like their prior album, Getting Away with Murder, the album continues the band's movement away from nu metal into more of a hard rock sound. Two singles were released from the album: "...To Be Loved" and "Forever". It is the last album to feature longtime original drummer Dave Buckner before he departed from the band in 2007.

The album was dedicated in the memory of Jacoby Shaddix's step-grandfather Howard William Roatch, the band's namesake, who committed suicide in 2006, following his diagnosis of an unspecified form of terminal cancer. The song "Roses on My Grave" is dedicated to him at live shows.

An alternate release of the album was released on June 12, 2007, which included an alternate cover, a fold-out poster, a cell phone wallpaper, and a free ringtone of the song "Forever". The tracklist was kept constant.

== Sales ==
The second single, "Forever", was successful in the US, peaking at #55 on the Hot 100.

== Track listing ==
No.	Title	Lyrics	Music	Length
1.	"...To Be Loved"	Jacoby Shaddix	Tobin Esperance	3:03
2.	"Alive (N' Out of Control)"	Shaddix	Esperance	3:22
3.	"Crash"	Shaddix	Esperance	3:21
4.	"The World Around You"	Shaddix; Dave Buckner	Esperance; Jerry Horton	4:35
5.	"Forever"	Shaddix; Buckner	Esperance; Horton	4:06
6.	"I Devise My Own Demise"	Shaddix	Esperance	3:36
7.	"Time Is Running Out"	Shaddix	Esperance	3:23
8.	"What Do You Do?"	Shaddix; Buckner	Esperance	4:22
9.	"My Heart Is a Fist" (featuring Travis Barker)	Shaddix	Esperance; Horton	4:58
10.	"No More Secrets"	Shaddix	Esperance; Horton	3:15
11.	"Reckless"	Shaddix; Buckner	Esperance	3:34
12.	"The Fire"	Shaddix	Esperance; Horton	3:32
13.	"Roses on My Grave"	Shaddix	Horton	3:13
Total length:				48:20

Mexican edition
No.	Title	Writer(s)	Length
14.	"Heridas" (Scars Spanish version)	Shaddix; Esperance	3:28
Total length:			51:48

United Kingdom edition
No.	Title	Writer(s)	Length
14.	"Scars" (Live in Chicago)	Shaddix; Esperance	3:38
15.	"SOS"	Shaddix; Esperance; Buckner; Horton	2:44
Total length:			54:42

Japanese edition
No.	Title	Writer(s)	Length
16.	"The Addict" (Japanese edition bonus track)	Shaddix; Esperance; Buckner; Horton	3:26
Total length:			51:46

== Personnel ==
=== Papa Roach ===
- Jacoby Shaddix – lead vocals
- Jerry Horton – guitar, backing vocals
- Tobin Esperance – bass, backing vocals
- Dave Buckner – drums

=== Additional musicians ===
- Keyboards by Howard Benson
- Percussion by Lenny Castro
- Piano on "My Heart Is a Fist" & "What Do You Do?" by Jamie Muhoberac
- Strings on "Roses on My Grave" by Jennifer Kuhn & Mark Robertson
- Drums on "My Heart Is a Fist" by Travis Barker

=== Production ===
- Produced by Howard Benson
- Co-produced by Papa Roach
- Mixed by Chris Lord-Alge
- Recorded by Mike Plotnikoff
- Additional recording by Michael Rosen
- Pro Tools editing by Paul Decarli
- Assistant engineering by Hatsukazu Inagaki
- String arrangements on "Roses on My Grave" by Debbie Lurie
- Recorded at The Paramour Mansion, Silver Lake, Bay 7 Studios, Valley Village, & Sparky Dark Studio, Calabasas, CA
- Strings recorded by Casey Stone at Entourage Studios, North Hollywood, CA
- Mixed at Resonate Music, Burbank, CA
- Assistant mixing by Keith Armstrong & Dim-E
- Mastered by Ted Jensen at Sterling Sound, NY
- Band assistant / life coordinator / master chef at the Paramour: Andres Torres
- A&R: Thom Panunzio
- A&R coordinator: Evan Peters
- Management by: Mike Renault & Dennis Sanders for Focus Three Entertainment
- Booking by Michael Arfin for AGI
- European booking: John Jackson for K2ours
- Business management: Jonathan Schwartz for GSO
- Legal representation: Eric Greenspan for Myman, Abell, Fineman, Greenspan & Light LLP
- Marketing for Geffen: Paul Orescan
- Art direction & design by Greg Patterson
- Additional art direction: Dave Buckner & Jerry Horton
- Coat of arms illustrated by Jeff Toll
- Band photography by Devin Dehaven
- Additional photography by KirstiAnna Urpa, Jerry Horton, Greg Patterson, Dave Buckner

== Appearances ==
- "...To Be Loved" was theme song for WWE Raw from 2006 to 2009.
- "...To Be Loved" is also featured in the soundtrack to the 2008 film Never Back Down.
- "...To Be Loved" and "The Addict" were featured in the commercial for Crüe Fest that Papa Roach and Buckcherry did.
- "Alive (N' Out Control)" is the theme song of the TV show Scarred, hosted by Jacoby Shaddix.
- "Time Is Running Out" and "Forever" are featured as downloadable tracks for the Rock Band games.
- "SOS" is also featured on the Crüe Fest compilation album.

== Charts ==
Chart (2006)	Peak position
Austrian Albums Chart	35
Belgium Albums Chart	69
French Albums Chart	160
German Albums Chart	35
Japanese Albums Chart	102
Netherlands Albums Chart	86
Scottish Albums	66
Swiss Albums Chart	33
UK Albums Chart	61
US Billboard 200	16
US Hard Rock Albums	12

== Certifications ==
Region	Certification	Certified units/sales
United States (RIAA)	Gold	500,000^{‡}
^{‡} Sales+streaming figures based on certification alone.
