= ...To Be Loved =

Single by Papa Roach

from the album The Paramour Sessions
- Released: August 8, 2006
- Recorded: December 2005 – May 2006
- Studio: Paramour Mansion (Hollywood, California)
- Genre: Alternative metal; hard rock; rap rock; alternative rock
- Length: 3:02
- Label: Geffen
- Songwriters: Jacoby Shaddix; Tobin Esperance
- Producer: Howard Benson

Papa Roach singles chronology
"Scars" (2004)	"...To Be Loved" (2006)	"Forever" (2007)

Music video
- "...To Be Loved" on YouTube

"...To Be Loved" is the first single from the band Papa Roach's fifth album, The Paramour Sessions. The song hit American radio stations on August 7, 2006. The song was played in full on Kerrang! Radio in the United Kingdom on August 1, 2006 and has since become available to download via the iTunes Store and Walmart Downloads store as a radio edit version. On September 18, the single became available in UK stores as a 7" vinyl picture disc with a complimentary Papa Roach sticker. The CD was released on October 11, 2006.

The song peaked at #8 on the Mainstream Rock Tracks and #14 on the Modern Rock Tracks.

== Composition ==
The song generally follows the band's hard rock sound of their previous album, Getting Away With Murder, although features rap vocals, similar to their band's first two albums. The song begins with a rapping introduction over punk-esque lo-fi drums, but as the introduction goes the rapping then goes into fast screaming, making it different from Jacoby Shaddix's usual rapping style of the band's earlier albums. The choruses and verses are sung, and the third chorus is followed by another rap verse.

== Music video ==
The music video was shot at Park Plaza Hotel (Los Angeles) and was directed by Kevin Kerslake. It begins by showing two scantily-clad women who are picked up by the vocalist, Jacoby Shaddix, of the band with three other women in the back. Then they arrive at a building where the band is playing. Meanwhile, strippers and circus performers are seen in the background, along with a huge crowd of fans. The video was shot on August 3, 2006. On August 15, 2006, the video for "...To Be Loved" premiered on Yahoo Music. There are three versions. The original censored one, one for public viewings (which removes the scene where a girl is shown on a leash), and an uncensored version. The start of the song also samples the Ramones' "Blitzkrieg Bop", with the 'Hey Ho, Lets Go!'.

== Use in media ==
The song was used as the official theme song for WWE Raw on the USA Network from October 9, 2006 to November 9, 2009. It was also used in the theatrical trailer of the 2008 film Never Back Down.

== Track listing ==
No.	Title	Length
1.	"...To Be Loved" (edited version)	3:02
2.	"...To Be Loved" (explicit version)	3:02

7" single

No.	Title	Length
1.	"...To Be Loved"	3:01
2.	"Getting Away with Murder" (Live in Chicago)	4:04

== Charts ==
=== Weekly charts ===
Weekly chart performance for "...To Be Loved"
Chart (2006)	Peak position
US Bubbling Under Hot 100 (Billboard)	16
US Alternative Airplay (Billboard)	14
US Mainstream Rock (Billboard)	8

=== Year-end charts ===
Year-end chart performance for "...To Be Loved"
Chart (2006)	Position
US Mainstream Rock Songs (Billboard)	38

== Certifications ==
Certifications for "...To Be Loved"
Region	Certification	Certified units/sales
United States (RIAA)	Gold	500,000^{‡}
^{‡} Sales+streaming figures based on certification alone.
