= Dead Cell =

Dead Cell may refer to:

- "Dead Cell", a song on the album Infest by American band Papa Roach
- Dead Cell, a fictional organization from the video game Metal Gear Solid 2: Sons of Liberty
- Dead Cells, a 2018 video game
