= Time Is Running Out (Papa Roach song) =

Single by Papa Roach

from the album The Paramour Sessions
- Released: 2007
- Recorded: December 2005 – May 2006
- Studio: Paramour Mansion (Hollywood, California)
- Genre: Alternative rock
- Length: 3:23
- Label: Geffen
- Songwriters: Jacoby Shaddix; Tobin Esperance
- Producer: Howard Benson

"Time Is Running Out" is the seventh track from Californian rock band Papa Roach's fifth album, The Paramour Sessions (2006). The song is also available as a downloadable track for the Rock Band games.

== Chart performance ==
Chart (2007)	Peak position
U.S. Billboard Modern Rock Tracks	17
U.S. Billboard Mainstream Rock Tracks	15
