= Broken Home (Papa Roach song) =

2000 single by Papa Roach

Single by Papa Roach

from the album Infest
- Released: September 12, 2000
- Genre: Nu metal
- Length: 3:41
- Label: DreamWorks
- Songwriters: Jacoby Shaddix; Tobin Esperance
- Producer: Jay Baumgardner

Papa Roach singles chronology
"Last Resort" (2000)	"Broken Home" (2000)	"Between Angels and Insects" (2001)

Music video
- "Broken Home" on YouTube

"Broken Home" is a song by American rock band Papa Roach. It appears on their second studio album, Infest, and was released as the album's second single on September 12, 2000. The song discusses family conflict and emotions in the aftermath of a divorce.

== Background and meaning ==
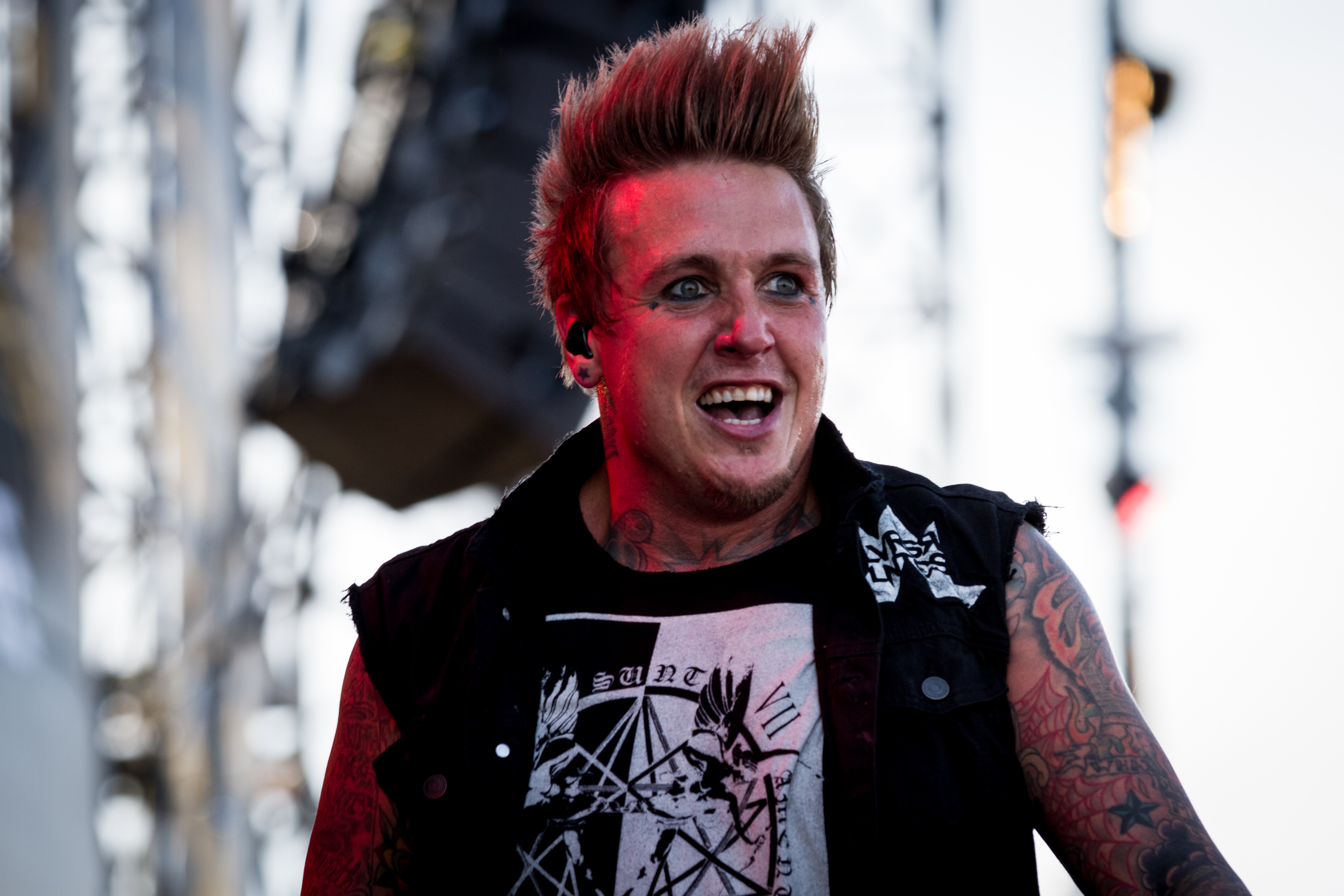
Papa Roach vocalist Jacoby Shaddix (pictured) said that "Broken Home" is about "divorce and being the kid caught in the middle, feeling it's your fault but finally realizing it isn't".

Vocalist Jacoby Shaddix said that "Broken Home" was about his family "falling to pieces, pretty much, and being stuck in the middle of two parents... One of them was actually not ever there. I had a bed-wetting problem for a lot of years, and I had a problem with my father." He attributed this to his father's time in the military, noting, "When he was 18 or so, my biological father went to the Vietnam War to be a killer for the U.S. government, and it really put a tax on his life... That war set up a lot of broken homes."

Bassist Tobin Esperance added that "Jacoby chose lyrically to set the topic in divorce, which is something that everybody in the band has dealt with and kids all over deal with. It's another painful subject to bring up, but people just let loose when it came to that song." Esperance said that his parents divorced when he was six, leading to a distanced relationship: "My dad's cool, but I don't really know him that well... [Jacoby] didn't see his dad for, I think, 13 years."

== Musical style ==
According to Esperance, the song "started out as a real funky kind of groove – a heavy guitar thing." He also noted the influence of alternative metal band Helmet: "I was playing that at rehearsal, and it reminded me of Helmet; we were really into this band, Helmet, from the East Coast, and the riff kind of reminded us of one of their songs. I don't remember the exact song. We all just started jamming on it".

== Commercial performance ==
Although "Broken Home" had some popularity, it did not match the popularity of Papa Roach's debut single "Last Resort." "Broken Home" peaked at number nine on the Modern Rock Tracks chart and number 18 on the Mainstream Rock chart. The song was on the Modern Rock Tracks chart for 20 weeks and the Mainstream Rock chart for 19 weeks.

== Critical reception ==
Chad Childers of Loudwire wrote that the song displayed Shaddix as "a master at baring his soul." Other reviews were less positive, citing a sense of immaturity; Sal Cinquemani of Slant called the track "painfully reductive" and Scott Seward of Spin wrote that it "[tried] to pick at teendom's boo-boos with Jonathan Davis' self-lacerating edge."

== Music video ==
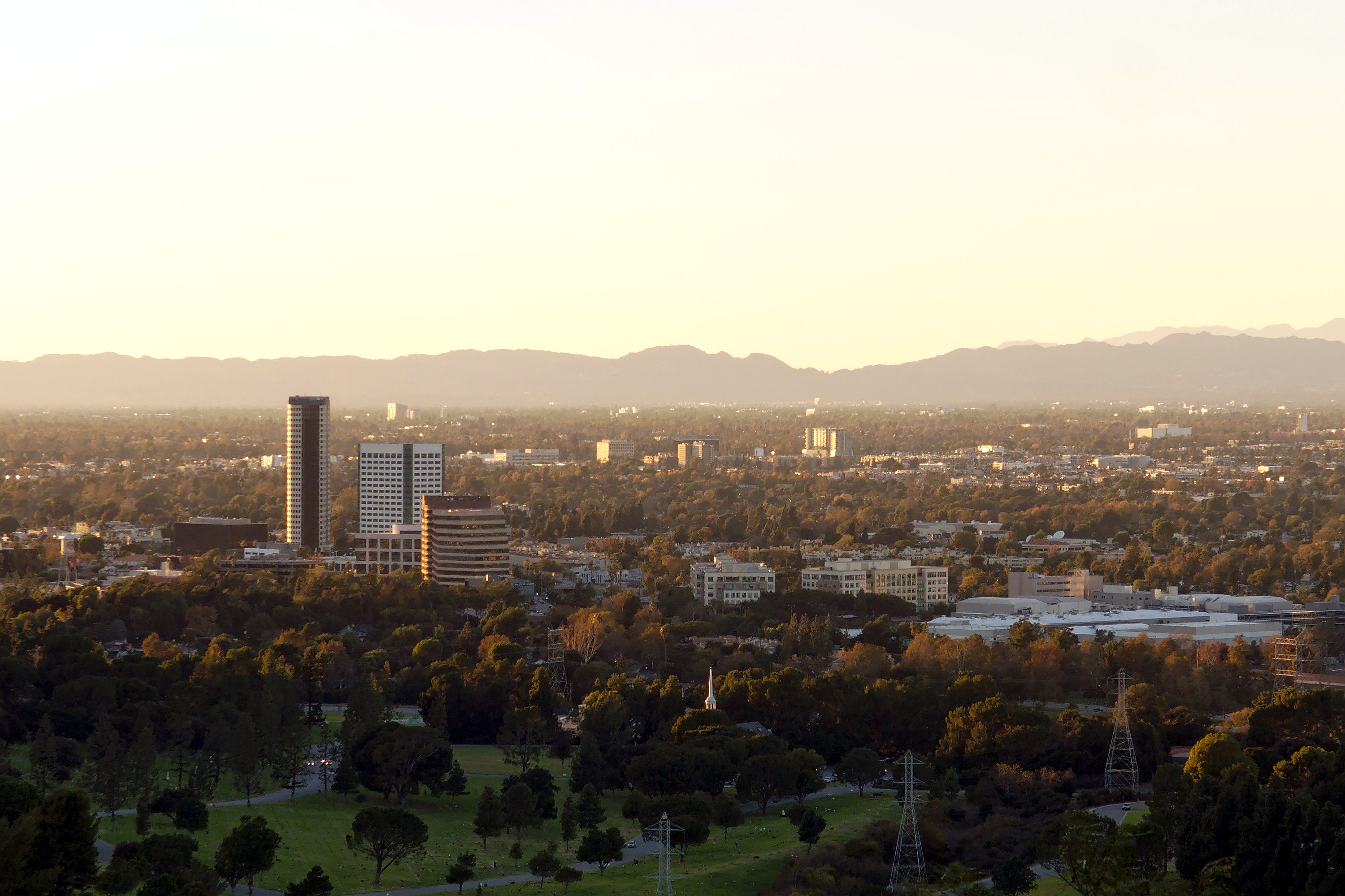
Burbank, California, the city where the music video for "Broken Home" was filmed.

The music video for "Broken Home" was directed by Marcos Siega. Filmed in the middle-class neighborhood of Burbank, California, the video shows Papa Roach performing in a house. This performance is interspersed with clips of a child's life and his dysfunctional family, including the mother's substance abuse and the father's rape of her and his infidelity. The video ends with the band destroying various items inside the house.

The process of filming was difficult on the band and crew; both Shaddix and a production assistant suffered mental breakdowns, leading to the latter reportedly stealing a van and disappearing for two days. Siega said, "I wanted the actors to lose themselves in the roles... [The father] really forced himself on the woman playing the mom. I yelled 'cut' not to stop the action but to stop the actress from crying. It was difficult to watch." According to guitarist Jerry Horton, Siega (whose parents were also separated) broke into tears during filming. However, there was no animosity between the band and Siega following shooting, and they expressed their appreciation by presenting him with an autographed guitar.

The music video for "Broken Home" was regularly featured on MTV and it was nominated for the Short Form Music Video category at the 43rd Grammy Awards.

== Track listing ==
CD maxi
No.	Title	Length
1.	"Broken Home" (album version)	3:41
2.	"Broken Home" (revised version)	3:28
3.	"Last Resort" (album version)	3:19

CD single
No.	Title	Length
1.	"Broken Home" (album version)	3:45
2.	"Broken Home" (radio version)	3:30
3.	"Never Enough" (live)	3:29
4.	"Broken Home" (enhanced video)

== Charts ==
Chart (2000–2001)	Peak position
Austrian Singles Chart	42
German Singles Chart	34
Swiss Singles Chart	96
US Alternative Airplay (Billboard)	9
US Mainstream Rock (Billboard)	18

== Release history ==
Region	Date	Format(s)	Label(s)	Ref.
United States	September 12, 2000	Modern rock radio	DreamWorks	
Europe	January 30, 2001	Maxi-CD	DreamWorks	

== Bibliography ==
- Kitts, Jeff; Tolinski, Brad (2002). Guitar World Presents Nu-metal. Hal Leonard Corporation. ISBN 9780634032875.
