= Time and Time Again (song) =

2002 single by Papa Roach

Single by Papa Roach

from the album Lovehatetragedy
- Released: October 15, 2002
- Recorded: 2002
- Genre: Nu metal; rap rock
- Length: 2:58
- Label: DreamWorks
- Songwriters: Jacoby Shaddix; Tobin Esperance
- Producer: Brendan O'Brien

Papa Roach singles chronology
"She Loves Me Not" (2002)	"Time and Time Again" (2002)	"Getting Away with Murder" (2004)

Music video
- "Time and Time Again" (Pepsi Version #1) on YouTube

"Time and Time Again" is the second single from the rock band Papa Roach's third studio album, Lovehatetragedy.

== Music video ==
The music video (directed by Samuel Bayer) shows the band driving black cars in a street race with the song playing on the car stereos. Sections of this video were used in the Papa Roach version of the Pepsi Blue television advertisements in 2002.

A second version was also made, known as the UK version. It shows the band driving around and playing concerts on the street of Sacramento, California, while the cops are hunting them down. Locations showcased including César Chávez Park, the Globe Mills and the Rainbow Bridge in Folsom, California.

== Track listing ==
CD single
No.	Title	Length
1.	"Time and Time Again"	2:58
2.	"She Loves Me Not" (live)	3:53
3.	"Born With Nothing, Die With Everything" (live)	4:04

UK CD single Pt. 1
No.	Title	Length
1.	"Time and Time Again"
2.	"Singular Indestructible Droid" (live at the Mean Fiddler)
3.	"Time and Time Again" (live video)

UK CD single Pt. 2
No.	Title	Length
1.	"Time and Time Again"	3:01
2.	"She Loves Me Not" (live at the Mean Fiddler)	3:39
3.	"Code of Energy" (live at the Mean Fiddler)	4:29
4.	"Time and Time Again" (video)

European CD single
No.	Title	Length
1.	"Time and Time Again"	3:00
2.	"Singular Indestructible Droid" (live at the Mean Fiddler)	3:49
3.	"Time and Time Again" (live at the Mean Fiddler)	3:23

== Chart performance ==
Chart (2002)	Peak position
Scotland Singles (OCC)	55
UK Singles Chart	54
U.S. Mainstream Rock Tracks	26
U.S. Modern Rock Tracks	33
