= Lovehatetragedy =

Studio album by Papa Roach
- Released: June 18, 2002
- Recorded: September – November 2001
- Studio: Royaltone Studios (Los Angeles, California)
- Genres: Nu metal; alternative metal
- Length: 39:01
- Label: DreamWorks
- Producer: Brendan O'Brien

Papa Roach chronology
Infest (2000)	Lovehatetragedy (2002)	Getting Away with Murder (2004)

Singles from Lovehatetragedy
- 1. "She Loves Me Not" Released: June 4, 2002; 2. "Time and Time Again" Released: October 15, 2002

Lovehatetragedy is the third overall and second major label studio album by the American rock band Papa Roach. It was released on June 18, 2002.

== Background ==
A re-recorded version of the song "M-80 (Explosive Energy Movement)" was featured in the game Amplitude. The song "She Loves Me Not" was featured in the game NHL 2003. The songs "She Loves Me Not" and "Walking Thru Barbed Wire" were recorded in 1999, with the former appearing on the band's 1999 demo and the latter on the ...Let 'Em Know! EP.

In comparison to their prior album Infest, the band aimed to incorporate less rapping, and more singing in Lovehatetragedy. Lovehatetragedy is Papa Roach's last album under DreamWorks Records, before signing to Geffen in 2003. Alongside with Infest, a debut vinyl edition of the album was released on September 8, 2017.

== Critical reception ==
Professional ratings
Aggregate scores
Source	Rating
Metacritic	75/100
Review scores
Source	Rating
AllMusic	4/5 stars
Blender	4/5 stars
Entertainment Weekly	C+
The Guardian	4/5 stars
NME	7/10
Playlouder	4/5 stars
Q	3/5 stars
Rolling Stone	4/5 stars
Slant Magazine	2/5 stars
Spin	8/10

According to the review aggregator Metacritic, Lovehatetragedy received "generally favorable reviews" based on a weighted average score of 75 out of 100 from 12 critic scores.

== Commercial performance ==
The album debuted at number two on the Billboard 200 by selling approximatively 136,000 copies in its first week, behind Eminem's The Eminem Show. Lovehatetragedy was mostly well received by music critics, gaining an average score of 75 on Metacritic.

Papa Roach toured on the second edition of the Anger Management Tour during the summer of 2002. They co-headlined with Eminem, who was also supported by Ludacris, Xzibit, X-Ecutioners, Bionic Jive during the tour. It was the last edition of Anger Management that had rock music being prominently featured, with Papa Roach's set occurring between Eminem and Ludacris's while Bionic Jive opened the concerts during the first half of the tour.

It achieved a gold certification in the U.S for exceeding 500,000 copies sold in the first two months. Despite peaking at higher positions on most international charts, "Lovehatetragedy" failed to catch the success of Infest both in lifetime sales and chartrun (15 weeks within the Billboard 200). It was also certified Gold in Canada, Switzerland and in the UK.

== Track listing ==
All lyrics are written by Jacoby Shaddix, except where noted; all music is composed by Tobin Esperance, except where noted.

No.	Title	Lyrics	Music	Length
1.	"M-80 (Explosive Energy Movement)"			2:27
2.	"Life Is a Bullet"			4:05
3.	"Time and Time Again"			2:59
4.	"Walking Thru Barbed Wire"			3:05
5.	"Decompression Period"	Shaddix; Dave Buckner		3:59
6.	"Born with Nothing, Die with Everything"			3:50
7.	"She Loves Me Not"			3:30
8.	"Singular Indestructible Droid"	Shaddix; Buckner	Esperance; Jerry Horton	3:49
9.	"Black Clouds"	Shaddix; Buckner		4:02
10.	"Code of Energy"	Shaddix; Buckner		4:04
11.	"Lovehatetragedy"		Esperance; Horton	3:11
Total length:				39:01

Japanese Edition

No.	Title	Writer(s)	Length
12.	"Gouge Away" (Pixies cover)	Black Francis	2:07
13.	"Never Said It"	Shaddix; Esperance	3:05
14.	"Naked in Front of the Computer" (Faith No More cover)	Mike Patton	2:13

Limited Edition

No.	Title	Writer(s)	Length
12.	"Gouge Away" (Pixies cover)	Black Francis	2:07
13.	"Never Said It"	Shaddix; Esperance	3:05
14.	"Between Angels and Insects" (live from Germany; video)	Shaddix; Esperance; Buckner; Horton	3:54
15.	"Last Resort" (live from Germany; video)	Shaddix; Esperance; Buckner; Horton	3:20

== Personnel ==
Papa Roach

- Jacoby Shaddix – lead vocals
- Jerry Horton – guitar, backing vocals
- Tobin Esperance – bass, backing vocals
- Dave Buckner – drums

Production

- Brendan O'Brien – producer, mixing
- Nick Didia – engineering
- Howard Karp – assistant engineering
- Adam Ayan – digital editing
- Jason Neto – design, Art direction
- Ron Handler – A&R
- Ken Schles – photography
- Danny Clinch – photography

== Charts ==
=== Weekly charts ===
Weekly chart performance for Lovehatetragedy
Chart (2002)	Peak position
Australian Albums (ARIA)	19
Austrian Albums (Ö3 Austria)	8
Belgian Albums (Ultratop Flanders)	5
Belgian Albums (Ultratop Wallonia)	10
Canadian Albums (Billboard)	5
Danish Albums (Hitlisten)	11
Dutch Albums (Album Top 100)	21
Europe (European Top 100 Albums)	8
Finnish Albums (Suomen virallinen lista)	11
French Albums (SNEP)	34
German Albums (Offizielle Top 100)	6
Hungarian Albums (MAHASZ)	28
Irish Albums (IRMA)	4
Italian Albums (FIMI)	37
Japanese Albums (Oricon)	64
New Zealand Albums (RMNZ)	24
Norwegian Albums (VG-lista)	25
Scottish Albums (Official Charts)	4
Swedish Albums (Sverigetopplistan)	25
Swiss Albums (Schweizer Hitparade)	3
UK Albums (Official Charts)	4
UK Rock & Metal Albums (Official Charts)	1
US Billboard 200	2

=== Year-end charts ===
Year-end chart performance for Lovehatetragedy
Chart (2002)	Position
Belgian Albums (Ultratop Flanders)	63
Canadian Albums (Nielsen SoundScan)	127
Canadian Alternative Albums (Nielsen SoundScan)	40
Canadian Metal Albums (Nielsen SoundScan)	19
German Albums (Offizielle Top 100)	95
Swiss Albums (Schweizer Hitparade)	53
UK Albums (OCC)	184
US Billboard 200	153

== Certifications ==
Certifications for Lovehatetragedy
Region	Certification	Certified units/sales
Canada (Music Canada)	Gold	50,000^{^}
Switzerland (IFPI Switzerland)	Gold	20,000^{^}
United Kingdom (BPI)	Gold	100,000^{^}
United States (RIAA)	Gold	500,000^{^}
^{^} Shipments figures based on certification alone.
