= Forever (Papa Roach song) =

Single by Papa Roach

from the album The Paramour Sessions
- Released: January 8, 2007
- Recorded: December 2005 – May 2006
- Studio: Paramour Mansion (Hollywood, California)
- Genre: Alternative rock
- Length: 4:06
- Label: Geffen
- Songwriters: Jacoby Shaddix; Tobin Esperance; Jerry Horton; Nathan Seright
- Producer: Howard Benson

Papa Roach singles chronology
"...To Be Loved" (2006)	"Forever" (2007)	"Hollywood Whore" (2008)

Music video
- "Forever" on YouTube

"Forever" is the second single from Californian rock band Papa Roach's fifth album, The Paramour Sessions (2006), and ninth released single in total. "Forever" peaked at number two on the Modern Rock Tracks chart (for nine weeks) and number two on the Mainstream Rock chart (for six weeks). It also peaked at number 55 on the Billboard Hot 100, making it their second-highest charting single there.

== Music video ==
There was a contest on YouTube in which fans created their own videos for the song, with the official video, directed by Meiert Avis, shot on May 23, 2007 in Brighton, England. On June 15, 2007, the video made its official debut on AOL.

== Track listing ==
No.	Title	Length
1.	"Forever" (album version)	4:06
2.	"Forever" (edited version)	4:06

== Charts ==
=== Weekly charts ===
Weekly chart performance for "Forever"
Chart (2007)	Peak position
Czech Republic Rock (IFPI)	19
US Billboard Hot 100	55
US Alternative Airplay (Billboard)	2
US Mainstream Rock (Billboard)	2
US Pop 100 (Billboard)	51

=== Year-end charts ===
Year-end chart performance for "Forever"
Chart (2007)	Position
US Alternative Songs (Billboard)	3
US Mainstream Rock (Billboard)	1

== Certifications ==
Certifications for "Forever"
Region	Certification	Certified units/sales
United States (RIAA)	Platinum	1,000,000^{‡}
^{‡} Sales+streaming figures based on certification alone.
