= Getting Away with Murder (album) =

2004 studio album by Papa Roach

Studio album by Papa Roach
- Released: August 31, 2004
- Recorded: September–November 2003
- Genres: Alternative rock; hard rock; alternative metal
- Length: 38:00
- Label: Geffen
- Producer: Howard Benson

Papa Roach chronology
Lovehatetragedy (2002)	Getting Away with Murder (2004)	The Paramour Sessions (2006)

Singles from Getting Away with Murder
- 1. "Getting Away with Murder" Released: July 19, 2004; 2. "Scars" Released: November 5, 2004; 3. "Take Me" Released: April 11, 2005

Alternative cover
- Clean version

Getting Away with Murder is the fourth studio album by American rock band Papa Roach. The album was a departure from the band's previous works, showcasing an alternative rock and hard rock sound instead of a nu metal and rap metal sound. Unlike their previous albums, the album features no rapping and instead only features Jacoby Shaddix singing. It was released on August 31, 2004, via Geffen Records and has been certified Gold in Canada, Silver in the United Kingdom and Platinum in the United States. Getting Away with Murder peaked at number 17 on the Billboard 200.

== Background ==
Production lasted from October to December 2003. During the recording of Getting Away with Murder, the band was not signed to a label as their previous label DreamWorks Records had recently been bought out. The band would later sign to Geffen Records. The album features a departure from the band's rap metal sound, as the band's vocalist Jacoby Shaddix stated that he was tired of rapping.

The track "Just Go (Never Look Back)" was recorded in the album's sessions, but was ultimately left off the album. The track would later be released on the band's future greatest hits album, ...To Be Loved: The Best of Papa Roach.

== Release and promotion ==
Papa Roach released Getting Away with Murder on August 31, 2004. The album's first single was the title track. The album debuted at number 17 on the Billboard 200, with 52,000 copies sold, less than a half of Lovehatetragedy. However, the title track saw success through radio and peaked at number two in the Mainstream Rock Tracks chart, number four on the Modern Rock Tracks and number 69 on the Billboard Hot 100. The second single, "Scars", peaked at number four on the Mainstream Rock Tracks chart, number two on the Modern Rock Tracks chart, number 15 on the Billboard Hot 100, and number seven on the Pop Songs chart, becoming the band's biggest hit in the United States. "Scars" was ranked at number 36 as the greatest song of 2005 and as the most successful song of the year by Billboard, becoming the band's first and only song to be included on Billboard's year-end charts, in addition, "Scars" was the band's first song to crossover to top 40 radio since their breakthrough hit, "Last Resort". The song "Take Me" also charted on the Modern Rock Tracks chart (at number 23), and on the Mainstream Rock Tracks chart (at number 11) despite not being released as a single. To support the album, the band toured throughout 2004 and 2005. Getting Away with Murder eventually achieved a Platinum certification in the United States, after spending 61 weeks on the Billboard 200 thanks to the hit of "Scars", outselling Lovehatetragedy. It is their second best-selling album after their debut Infest, also their first and only album to have at least two Hot 100 hits.

Several other tracks were used to promote the album across various mediums. The track "Blood (Empty Promises)" was featured on the Saw II soundtrack and the track "Getting Away with Murder" was featured in the end credits of The Chronicles of Riddick, as well as the video games MechAssault 2: Lone Wolf and MX vs. ATV Unleashed. "Not Listening" was used in the trailer for Resident Evil: Apocalypse and is also featured in the video games NASCAR 2005: Chase for the Cup, Gran Turismo 4, and FlatOut 2.

== Reception ==
Professional ratings
Aggregate scores
Source	Rating
Metacritic	59/100
Review scores
Source	Rating
AllMusic	2/5 stars
Blender	3/5 stars
Dotmusic	8/10
Entertainment Weekly	C+
IGN	5.5/10
Melodic	3.5/5 stars
Rolling Stone	3/5 stars
Spin	B
Sputnikmusic	4/5

According to the review aggregator Metacritic, Getting Away with Murder received "mixed or average reviews" based on a weighted average score of 59 out of 100 from 8 critic scores.

== Track listing ==
All lyrics are written by Jacoby Shaddix, except where noted; all music is composed by Tobin Esperance, except where noted.

No.	Title	Lyrics	Music	Length
1.	"Blood (Empty Promises)"			2:55
2.	"Not Listening"			3:09
3.	"Stop Looking Start Seeing"			3:08
4.	"Take Me"			3:26
5.	"Getting Away with Murder"		Esperance; Jerry Horton	3:12
6.	"Be Free"			3:17
7.	"Done with You"			2:52
8.	"Scars"			3:28
9.	"Sometimes"	Shaddix; Dave Buckner	Esperance; Horton	3:07
10.	"Blanket of Fear"			3:21
11.	"Tyranny of Normality"			2:40
12.	"Do or Die"	Shaddix; Buckner		3:25
Total length:				38:00

Bonus tracks
No.	Title	Writer(s)	Length
13.	"Harder Than a Coffin Nail"	Shaddix; Esperance; Buckner; Horton	3:28
14.	"Caught Dead"	Shaddix; Esperance; Buckner; Horton	3:04
15.	"Take Me" (live Napster version)		3:29
Total length:			48:01

Original track listing
No.	Title	Length
1.	"Not Listening"	3:09
2.	"Take Me"	3:26
3.	"Getting Away with Murder"	3:12
4.	"Scars"	3:28
5.	"Be Free"	3:17
6.	"Visions" (retitled "Do or Die")	3:21
7.	"Done with You"	2:52
8.	"Blood (Empty Promises)"	2:55
9.	"Just Go"	2:56
10.	"These Walls" (retitled "Stop Looking, Start Seeing")	3:07
11.	"Sometimes"	3:07
12.	"Tyranny of Normality"	2:40
Total length:		37:35

== Personnel ==
=== Papa Roach ===
- Jacoby Shaddix – lead vocals
- Jerry Horton – guitar, backing vocals
- Tobin Esperance – bass, backing vocals
- Dave Buckner – drums

=== Additional musicians ===
- Programming by Howard Benson and Paul Decarli
- Keyboards by Howard Benson

=== Production ===
- Produced by Howard Benson at Bay 7 Studios Valley Village, CA and Sparky Dark Studio, Calabasas, CA
- Mixed by Chris Lord-Alge at Image Recorders, Hollywood, CA
- "Blanket of Fear" mixed by Mike Plotnikoff at Bay 7 Studio, Valley Village, CA
- Recorded by Mike Plotnikoff
- Additional engineering by Eric Miller
- Pro Tools editing by Paul Decarli, Mike Plotnikoff, and Eric Miller
- Mastered by Ted Jensen at Sterling Sound, NYC
- Drum technician: Gersh for Drum Fetish
- Guitar guru: Keith Nelson
- Pre-production technician: Bob Wall
- Pre-production studios: Mates
- Production coordinator: Dana Childs
- Management by Mike Renault and Dennis Sanders
- Booking: Jenna Adler for Creative Artists Agency
- European booking: John Jackson for Helter Skelter
- Business management: Jonathan Schwartz for GSO
- Legal representation: Eric Greenspan for Myman, Abell, Fineman, Greenspan, and Light LLP
- A&R coordination: Graham Martin
- Marketing by Jen Littleton
- Art direction by Greg Patterson, Jerry Horton and Dave Buckner
- Band photography by Olaf Heine, Jerry Horton
- Additional photography: Michael D. Knight, Lisa Sweet, and Dave Rau
- Graphic design: Greg Patterson for singlemanriot.com
- Enhanced CD produced by Greg Patterson and Devin Dehaven for FORTRESSDVD
- Edited by Devin Dehaven, Tim Mardesich and Tony Minter
- Opening sequence by BACKWARDHEROES
- Avid DS operator: Bruce. W. Cathcart
- A&R: Ron Handler

== Appearances ==
- The song "Not Listening" was featured in the video games NASCAR 2005: Chase for the Cup in 2004, FlatOut 2 in 2006, and Gran Turismo 4, and was also featured in the trailer for the 2004 film Resident Evil: Apocalypse.
- The song "Getting Away with Murder" was featured in MechAssault 2: Lone Wolf in 2004 and MX vs. ATV Unleashed in 2005.
- The song "Stop Looking Start Seeing" was featured in EA's NFL Street 2 in 2004.

== Charts ==
=== Weekly charts ===
Weekly chart performance for Getting Away with Murder
Chart (2004)	Peak position
Australian Albums (ARIA)	82
Austrian Albums (Ö3 Austria)	8
Belgian Albums (Ultratop Flanders)	14
Belgian Albums (Ultratop Wallonia)	50
Dutch Albums (Album Top 100)	38
French Albums (SNEP)	64
German Albums (Offizielle Top 100)	8
Irish Albums (IRMA)	32
Japanese Albums (Oricon)	84
Scottish Albums (Official Charts)	28
Swedish Albums (Sverigetopplistan)	21
Swiss Albums (Schweizer Hitparade)	13
UK Albums (Official Charts)	30
US Billboard 200	17

=== Year-end charts ===
Year-end chart performance for Getting Away with Murder
Chart (2005)	Position
US Billboard 200	77

== Certifications ==
Certifications and sales for Getting Away with Murder
Region	Certification	Certified units/sales
Canada (Music Canada)	Gold	50,000^{^}
Germany (BVMI)	Gold	100,000^{‡}
United Kingdom (BPI)	Silver	60,000^{*}
United States (RIAA)	Platinum	1,000,000^{^}
^{*} Sales figures based on certification alone.^{^} Shipments figures based on certification alone.^{‡} Sales+streaming figures based on certification alone.
