= Scars (Papa Roach song) =

2005 single by Papa Roach

Single by Papa Roach

from the album Getting Away with Murder
- Released: November 1, 2004
- Genre: Alternative rock; emo; post-grunge
- Length: 3:28
- Label: Geffen
- Composers: Jerry Horton; Tobin Esperance
- Lyricist: Jacoby Shaddix
- Producer: Howard Benson

Papa Roach singles chronology
"Getting Away with Murder" (2004)	"Scars" (2004)	"...To Be Loved" (2006)

Music video
- "Scars" on YouTube

"Scars" is the second single released from American rock band Papa Roach's fourth album, Getting Away with Murder (2004), and was released to rock radio on November 1, 2004. The song was the 36th-most-successful single of the United States in 2005, when it climbed to No. 15 on the Billboard Hot 100. As with several of their other songs, Papa Roach has performed "Scars" live with Spanish lyrics.

== Music video ==
There were two different music videos for the song. The first music video was directed by Steven Murashige and notably featured computer animation. After receiving negative reception from fans and the band itself, a second video was shot.

The second music video was directed by Motion Theory. The video tells the story of Shaddix's girlfriend, played by Taylor Cole, who drinks excessively and parties too much. One day, she gets too drunk and passes out at a party at Shaddix's house. She wakes up the following morning with a hangover and, while grabbing her coat, knocks over a candle, which lands on a mat on the floor. The mat is stained with her drink from the night before. She unknowingly lights the house on fire and then goes home. When Shaddix arrives, he finds his house burnt down. The girlfriend returns to the ruin, sees what happened, and realizes what she did. The band performs this song on top of the burnt remains of Shaddix's house.

== Commercial performance ==
"Scars" was Papa Roach's first and only top-40 hit on the US Billboard Hot 100, peaking at No. 15. It reached No. 2 and No. 4 on the Billboard Modern Rock Tracks and Mainstream Rock Tracks charts, respectively, and became their first hit on the Billboard Mainstream Top 40, peaking at No. 7. In Canada, the song rose to No. 22 on the Radio & Records CHR/Pop Top 30 listing. It also charted in Germany, peaking at No. 82 in June 2005. In the United States, the song is certified triple platinum by the Recording Industry Association of America (RIAA) for digital sales exceeding 3,000,000.

== Track listings ==
European maxi-CD and Australian CD single
No.	Title	Length
1.	"Scars"	3:28
2.	"Scars" (acoustic version)	3:08
3.	"Getting Away with Murder" (live Napster version)	3:26
4.	"Scars" (video)

== Personnel ==
Personnel are adapted from the European maxi-CD single liner notes.

- Jacoby Shaddix – words
- Jerry Horton – music
- Tobin Esperance – music
- Howard Benson – production
- Chris Lord-Alge – mixing

== Charts ==
=== Weekly charts ===
Chart (2005)	Peak position
Bolivia (Notimex)	3
Canada CHR/Pop Top 30 (Radio & Records)	22
Canada Rock Top 30 (Radio & Records)	9
Germany (GfK)	82
US Billboard Hot 100	15
US Adult Pop Airplay (Billboard)	31
US Alternative Airplay (Billboard)	2
US Mainstream Rock (Billboard)	4
US Pop Airplay (Billboard)	7

=== Year-end charts ===
Chart (2005)	Position
US Billboard Hot 100	36
US Adult Top 40 (Billboard)	97
US Mainstream Rock Tracks (Billboard)	17
US Mainstream Top 40 (Billboard)	10
US Modern Rock Tracks (Billboard)	15

== Certifications ==
Region	Certification	Certified units/sales
New Zealand (RMNZ)	Platinum	30,000^{‡}
United Kingdom (BPI)	Silver	200,000^{‡}
United States (RIAA)	3× Platinum	3,000,000^{‡}
^{‡} Sales+streaming figures based on certification alone.

== Release history ==
Region	Date	Format(s)	Label(s)	Ref.
United States	November 1, 2004	Mainstream rock; active rock; alternative radio	Geffen	
United States	January 24, 2005	Contemporary hit radio	Geffen	
Australia	May 23, 2005	CD	Geffen	
