= WWE Raw =

Professional wrestling television program

- Logo used since 2025
- Also known as: Raw is War (1997–2001); Raw SuperShow (2011–2012)
- Genre: Professional wrestling
- Created by: Vince McMahon
- Written by: Jonathan Baeckstrom (Lead Writer); Alexandra Williams (Lead Writer); See list of Raw creative writers
- Presented by: Joe Tessitore (play-by-play commentator); Michael Cole (alternate play–by–play commentator); Wade Barrett (color commentator); Corey Graves (alternate color commentator)
- Starring: Raw roster
- Announcer: Alicia Taylor
- Opening theme: "Godzilla" by Eminem featuring Juice Wrld
- Country of origin: United States
- No. of seasons: 33
- No. of episodes: 1746

Production
- Executive producers: Paul Levesque (2024–present); Lee Fitting (2024–present)
- Camera setup: Multi-camera setup
- Running time: 60 minutes (January 11, 1993–January 27, 1997); 120 minutes (February 3, 1997–July 16, 2012, October 7–December 30, 2024); 180 minutes (July 23, 2012–September 30, 2024); Flexible, c. 150 minutes (from January 6, 2025) (Note: Netflix affords WWE with a degree of creative freedom with regards to show length; WWE currently target, and produce, Raw to fit into a two and a half hour window.) (including commercials) (Note: Commercials are replaced with exclusive content for international viewers on Netflix.)
- Production company: World Wrestling Entertainment, LLC

Original release
- Network: USA Network
- Release: January 11, 1993 – September 18, 2000
- Network: Spike TV (Note: Known as The National Network from 2000–2001 and The New TNN from 2001–2003.)
- Release: September 25, 2000 – September 26, 2005
- Network: USA Network
- Release: October 3, 2005 – December 30, 2024
- Network: Netflix
- Release: January 6, 2025 – present

Related
- WWE SmackDown; WWE Evolve; WWE NXT

WWE Raw, also known as Monday Night Raw or simply Raw, is an American professional wrestling television program produced by WWE. It currently airs live every Monday at 8 p.m. Eastern Time (ET) on Netflix. The show features characters from the Raw brand, to which WWE wrestlers are assigned to work and perform. It debuted on January 11, 1993, and is considered to be one of WWE's two flagship programs, along with WWE SmackDown.

Since its first episode, Raw has been broadcast live from 210 different arenas, 173 cities and towns, and twelve different nations, mostly in the United States; Raw shows have also been broadcast and taped in Belgium, Canada, Germany, Italy, Japan, Mexico, Saudi Arabia, South Africa, France, Australia, and the United Kingdom, as well as Afghanistan and Iraq as part of Tribute to the Troops.

Debuting on the USA Network television channel, Raw moved in September 2000 to TNN, which rebranded to Spike TV in August 2003. On October 3, 2005, Raw returned to USA Network, where it remained until January 6, 2025, when it moved to the Netflix streaming platform, which is scheduled to broadcast the program for a period of at least 10 years. The company's own WWE Network ceased operations in the United States on April 5, 2021, with all content being moved to Peacock, which had most previous Raw episodes until the transition to Netflix in 2025. Raw has also been broadcast globally on other networks since it first began.

== History ==
=== Early years ===
The first Raw logo used in the New Generation Era from January 11, 1993, to March 3, 1997

Beginning as WWF's Monday Night Raw, the program first aired on January 11, 1993, on the USA Network as a replacement for Prime Time Wrestling, which aired on the network for eight years. The original Raw was sixty minutes in length and broke new ground in televised professional wrestling. Traditionally, wrestling shows were pre-taped on sound stages with small audiences or at large arena shows. The Raw formula was considerably different from the pre-taped weekend shows that aired at the time such as Superstars and Wrestling Challenge. Instead of matches taped weeks in advance with studio voice overs and taped discussion, Raw was a show shot and aired to a live audience, with angles and matches playing out as they happened.

Raw originated from the Grand Ballroom at the Manhattan Center, a small New York City theater, and aired live each week. The combination of an intimate venue and live action proved to be a successful improvement. However, the weekly live schedule proved to be a financial drain on the WWF. From spring 1993 until spring 1997, Raw would tape several week's worth of episodes after a live episode had aired. The WWF taped several weeks worth of Raw from the Mid-Hudson Civic Center in Poughkeepsie, New York in April 1993, and again in June and October. The first episode produced outside of New York was taped in Bushkill, Pennsylvania in November 1993 and Raw left the Manhattan Center permanently as the show would be taken on the road throughout the United States and in smaller venues.

=== The Attitude Era and Spike TV ===
"RAW is WAR" logo used from March 10, 1997, to September 24, 2001

On September 4, 1995, the WWF's chief competitor World Championship Wrestling (WCW) began airing its new wrestling show, Monday Nitro, live each week on TNT, which marked the start of the Monday Night War. Raw and Nitro went head-to-head for the first time on September 11, 1995. At the start of the ratings war in 1995 through to mid-1996, Raw and Nitro exchanged victories over each other in a closely contested rivalry. Beginning in mid-1996, however, due to the nWo angle, Nitro started a ratings win-streak that lasted for 84 consecutive weeks, ending on April 13, 1998. On February 3, 1997, Raw went to a two-hour format, to compete with the extra hour on Nitro (which had been expanded to two hours in the spring of 1996), and by March 10, it was renamed to Raw Is War. It was also during the time Raw would be aired live more often. After WrestleMania XIV in March 1998, the WWF regained the lead in the Monday Night War with its new "WWF Attitude" brand. The April 13, 1998 episode of Raw Is War, which was headlined by a match between Stone Cold Steve Austin and Vince McMahon, marked the first time that Nitro had lost the head-to-head Monday night ratings battle in the 84 weeks since 1996.

On January 4, 1999, Mick Foley, who had wrestled for WCW during the early 1990s as Cactus Jack, won the WWF Championship as Mankind on Raw Is War. On orders from Eric Bischoff, Nitro announcer Tony Schiavone gave away this previously taped result on a live Nitro and then sarcastically added, "That's gonna put some butts in the seats", consequently resulting in over 600,000 viewers switching channels to Raw Is War to see the underdog capture the WWF Championship. This was also the night that Nitro aired a WCW World Heavyweight Championship match in which Kevin Nash laid down for Hollywood Hogan after Hogan poked him in the chest.

On June 28, 2000, Viacom won the landmark deal with the WWF to move all of its WWF programs stemming from the lawsuit action against WWF from USA Network. The new television contract and the subsequent purchase of competitor WCW led to many changes in WWF's programming content. Raw Is War premiered on TNN on September 25, 2000.

WCW's sharp decline in revenue and ratings led to AOL Time Warner selling selected assets such as the WCW name, tape library, and contracts to the WWF in March 2001 for $3 million. The final episode of Nitro, which aired on March 26, 2001, began with Vince McMahon making a short statement about his recent purchase of WCW and ended with a simulcast with Raw on TNN and Nitro on TNT including an appearance by Vince's son Shane. The younger McMahon interrupted his father's gloating over the WCW purchase to explain that Shane was the one who actually owned WCW, setting up what became the WWF's "Invasion" storyline. Following the purchase of WCW and the September 11 attacks, the program was retitled as Raw on October 1, 2001, permanently retiring the Raw Is War moniker in prelude to the upcoming United States invasion of Afghanistan.

In March 2002, as a result of the overabundance of talent left over from the Invasion storyline, WWF instituted a process known as the "brand extension", under which Raw and SmackDown! would be treated as two distinct divisions, each with their own rosters and championships. Shortly thereafter, the WWF was legally required to change the name of the company to World Wrestling Entertainment (WWE).

=== Return to USA Network ===
This Raw logo has been in use since July 30, 2016, albeit with alterations. This logo was used from 2019 to 2024.

On March 10, 2005, Viacom and WWE decided not to go on with the agreement with Spike TV (formerly TNN, now Paramount Network), effectively ending Raw and other WWE programs' tenure on Spike TV when their deal expired in September 2005. On April 4, 2005, WWE announced a three-year deal with NBCUniversal to bring Raw back to its former home, USA Network, with two yearly specials on NBC and a Spanish Raw on Telemundo. On the same week as Raw's return to USA Network, Spike TV scheduled Ultimate Fighting Championship (UFC)'s live Ultimate Fight Night in Raw's old timeslot in an attempt to go head-to-head with Raw.

Since the return to USA Network, Raw has been pre-empted during the U.S. Open, which aired on USA, resulting in Raw to be moved to SciFi, a sister channel to USA, for three years. Since 2016, the two-hour version of that week's Raw has aired on Syfy. In February 2022, Raw temporarily moved to Syfy for two episodes due to USA's coverage (as part of NBC Sports) of the 2022 Winter Olympics.

On the August 29, 2011, episode of Raw, it was announced that performers from Raw and SmackDown were no longer exclusive to their respective brand, thus effectively dissolving the brand extension. On July 23, 2012, Raw aired its 1,000th episode, which also began its permanent three-hour format. On January 14, 2013, Raw celebrated its 20th year on the air. On May 25, 2016, WWE reintroduced the brand split, and a new set with red ring ropes, a brand new stage, used at SummerSlam. Furthermore, the broadcast table was moved to the entrance ramp similar to how it was in 2002–2005. On January 22, 2018, WWE celebrated the 25th anniversary of Raw with a simulcast show at the Barclays Center in Brooklyn and the home of the first Monday Night Raw, the Manhattan Center. On the February 19 episode of Raw, six days before Elimination Chamber, seven participants of the men's Elimination Chamber match, Braun Strowman, Elias, Finn Bálor, John Cena, Roman Reigns, Seth Rollins and The Miz, were involved in a Gauntlet match that began with Reigns and Rollins. Strowman won the Gauntlet match by pinning The Miz in what was the longest match in WWE history, lasting nearly two hours.

From March 12, 2020, to August 18, 2020, WWE announced that all of its live programs would air from the WWE Performance Center in Orlando, Florida without an audience until further notice beginning with the following day's episode of SmackDown due to the COVID-19 pandemic that resulted in the suspension of many professional sports leagues. On the May 25 episode of Raw, NXT trainees were added into live crowds at the Performance Center. In August, all programming was moved to the new, state-of-the-art WWE ThunderDome inside of the Amway Center in Orlando. On May 21, 2021, WWE announced that they will return in front of live fans with a 25 city tour, therefore the July 12, 2021 edition of Raw would be the final WWE ThunderDome show.

=== Move to Netflix ===
In September 2023, USA Network announced that SmackDown would return to the network in October 2024 after the expiration of its contract with Fox; it was concurrently reported that the rights to Raw and NXT were on the market with heavy interest among linear networks and digital properties.

On January 23, 2024, TKO Group announced that Netflix would acquire the rights to Raw beginning in January 2025, in what was reported to be a 10-year deal worth $500 million per-year (roughly double the value of WWE's current agreement with NBCUniversal). The agreement will initially cover the United States, Canada, the United Kingdom, and Latin America, with other territories to be added in the future. The agreement also gives Netflix rights to all WWE programming outside of the United States (replacing WWE Network), including weekly shows, archive content, and live events. While USA Network's contract for Raw was to expire in October 2024, WWE reached a short-term extension of its agreement with NBCUniversal to keep Raw on the network through the end of the year. From October 7 through December 30, Raw was shortened from three to two hours; wrestling reporter Dave Meltzer stated that this was a request made by USA Network.

With the move to streaming, WWE chief content officer Paul "Triple H" Levesque said that the length of the show on Netflix will be "flexible", and no longer bound to a set runtime as with shows carried on linear television. When asked about the average runtime of each episode, he responded that "for me, the perfect show time is somewhere in the two-and-a-half-hour range. If you had asked me years ago, the two hour shows, you get into them and you don't have the real estate on that program to get everything in there you want to get in, all the stories and characters. Sometimes, it's a good thing because it creates scarcity and opportunity for people to be more over, but sometimes there are things you want to get in there."

Episodes that are broadcast on Netflix are aired as a live stream, except for taped (pre-recorded) episodes, which are edited for content following the live tapings, before being released as a VOD at the scheduled start time, like most other shows on the platform.

== Viewership ==
According to data from Showlabs, Raw ranked in the Netflix top 10 in the United States from the week of 6 January through the week of 2 February 2025, placing among the platform’s most watched titles during that period.

== Production ==
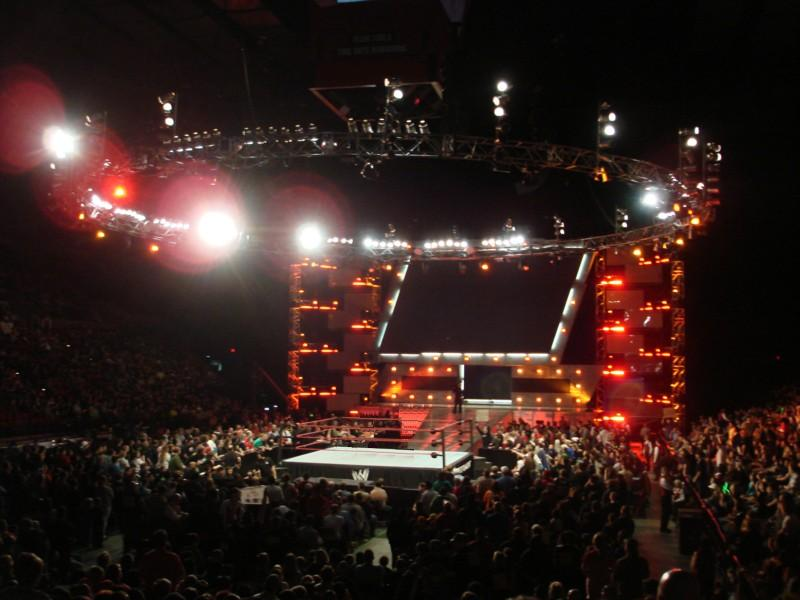
The USA Network version of the Raw modern TitanTron set that was used from October 3, 2005, to January 14, 2008

Raw's original set featured red, white, and blue ring-ropes, a blue ring-apron, blue steps, and a small stage made of neon light tubes. In 1995, the entrance way was changed to feature "Raw" in giant letters. Beginning on March 10, 1997, broadcasts of Raw were split into two hour-long blocks, each given its own name for television ratings purposes. The first hour was referred to as Raw Is War, and the second became known as War Zone. These changes were reflected in television listings and, beginning with the June 9, 1997, episode, by the show's on-screen graphics. War Zone initially opened with a repeat of the Raw intro, punctuated with the War Zone logo. On November 24, 1997, the hour received its own distinct opening video, a remixed version of the typical Raw opening.

In 1997, the WWF changed the color of the ring-ropes to red and began printing Raw Is War along the ring in reference to their rivalry with WCW. The stages was updated to feature a 70-foot tall large screen video wall known as the "TitanTron", which consisted of a projection screen with several metal stage trusses and a video projector. The set also initially featured curtains on each side with truss beams and lighting later bearing the "WWF Attitude" banner on the sides. By 1999, the WWF placed a "WWF.com: 'Download This!'" logo on the bottom of the TitanTron and added two vertical sides on the stage along with a USA Network logo on top of the TitanTron.

While episodes were primarily produced in and broadcast from the United States as well as Canada, the WWF began to tape a few episodes in Germany and South Africa in 1997, and in the 21st century the company have expanded further and more frequently broadcast at arenas worldwide outside of the US and Canada.

Raw moved to TNN from USA beginning with the September 25, 2000 episode. The TNN network logo was added atop the TitanTron on the December 11, 2000 episode. Chyron graphics were added to the bottom beginning with the July 2, 2001 episode.

Beginning October 1, 2001, in direct response to the September 11 attacks, the first hour was referred to as Raw instead of Raw Is War, and the second hour was rebranded from the War Zone to the Raw Zone within the show's on-screen graphics. The Monday Night War had ended months earlier with the WWF's purchase of the competing WCW brand. Monday Nitro, which had once gone head-to-head with Raw, aired its final show in March. WWF announcers began generally referring to the entire two-hour block as Raw on-air. Raw updated to a new, industrial-inspired, parallelogram-shaped TitanTron in 2002. Ring apron lettering that had once born Raw Is War slogan was replaced with an advertisement for the WWF website. Around this time, black ring-ropes were occasionally used. Like the previous set, the TNN logo was relocated to the bottom side of the TitanTron. It was subsequently replaced by the Spike TV logo on August 11, 2003, upon network relaunch. During the July 25, 2005 broadcast of Raw in Cleveland, Ohio, a special stage design was built for the John Cena-Chris Jericho Battle of the Bands concert.

The 2002 set was designed by Production Designer Jason Robinson. It featured a larger TitanTron with dimensions of 55 feet wide by 25 feet tall. The expanded structure weighed about 4,000 pounds and requiring three 18,000-watt projector screens to power itself. According to Eric Bischoff on a 2003 episode of WWE Confidential, the show utilized 13 cameras at the time at a cost of $85,000.

On October 3, 2005, as Raw returned to USA Network, the 2002 set was retained but the beams and lighting on the sides were modified. The Spike TV logo was removed from the bottom side of the TitanTron. On October 9, 2006, the show debuted a new logo and opening intro featuring "...To Be Loved" by Papa Roach as its theme song. This logo and intro were retained until November 9, 2009, a period that also saw the changeover to broadcasting Raw in high-definition, which occurred on January 21, 2008.

From November 16, 2009, to July 16, 2012, the theme song for the Raw brand was "Burn It to the Ground" by Nickelback. Prior to this, the theme song for Raw was "...To Be Loved" by Papa Roach, which had been used since October 9, 2006 and "Across The Nation" by The Union Underground which was used from April 1, 2002, to October 2, 2006. The rock and roll outro of "Thorn In Your Eye" featuring Scott Ian of Anthrax was the theme song from March 31, 1997, to March 25, 2002.

On May 17, 2012, WWE and USA Network announced that Raw would switch to a permanent three-hour format beginning with the 1,000th episode on July 23, 2012. Since then, all three hours of the broadcast have been known solely as Raw, though they are still considered three separate programs for Nielsen ratings purposes (as indicated by the on-screen copyright notice shown near the end of each hour). In 2010, WWE retired the red ropes for Raw after thirteen years for an all white scheme, which in 2012 became standard for all WWE programming. In 2012, Raw updated their HD set.

Beginning in mid-2014, this set would also be featured in pay-per-views. From late September through the end of October 2012, the middle rope at all WWE programming was changed to pink due to WWE's alliance with the Susan G. Komen organization for Breast Cancer Awareness Month. This was repeated in 2013, from late September to early November, and it was repeated in 2014 from September 29. WWE is one of many organizations who provide financial contributions to the organization in addition to raising awareness among its staff and consumers.

On August 18, 2014, Raw switched to a full 16:9 letterbox widescreen presentation, with a down-scaled version of the native HD feed on a 4:3 SD feed. In conjunction with this, Raw updated its graphics package, with the new WWE logo (first used with the WWE Network's launch in February) now on the lower-right corner of the screen, right next to the word, "Live". At this time, the new WWE logo began appearing on the ring's turnbuckle covers, and USA Network logo moved to the lower-left hand corner of the screen. Additionally, Raw's theme song ("The Night") was modified.

On March 23, 2015, WWE added a small LED board to the left side of the ring on Raw. This LED board was also used at WrestleMania 31. The LED board has since been featured on a sporadic basis, appearing in some weeks and being absent in others. On the 1,000th episode of Raw, "The Night" by Kromestatik debuted as the theme for Raw. "Energy" by Shinedown served as the secondary theme-song until August 18, 2014, when it was replaced with "Denial" by We Are Harlot.

On the September 14, 2015 season premiere of Raw, the middle rope was colored gold. Throughout the month of October 2015, the program once again partnered with Susan G. Komen for the Cure to promote Breast Cancer Awareness Month, with various stage elements being made pink. On the November 16, 2015, episode of Raw, WWE had a moment of silence for the victims of the terrorist attack in Paris, France, on November 13, 2015. Another moment of silence was held months later in June for the victims of the Orlando nightclub shooting.

On July 25, 2016, the ropes returned to red, the announce table moved back to the top of the stage for the first time since 2005, and a new HD set and graphics were debuted. The new set was almost identical to the set used for SummerSlam 2012 and 2013. After some fans responded negatively to the redesign, the set was revamped four weeks later with a more elaborate and distinctive arrangement. The new set featured the absence of a traditional TitanTron, which had been part of the Raw staging since 1997. In its place was a curved LED banner with several rows of rectangle LED lights behind it. The new set also introduced LED floor panels on the entrance ramp along with LED ring posts. On the January 29, 2018 episode of Raw, new graphics and an updated logo were introduced, which lasted until September 23, 2019.

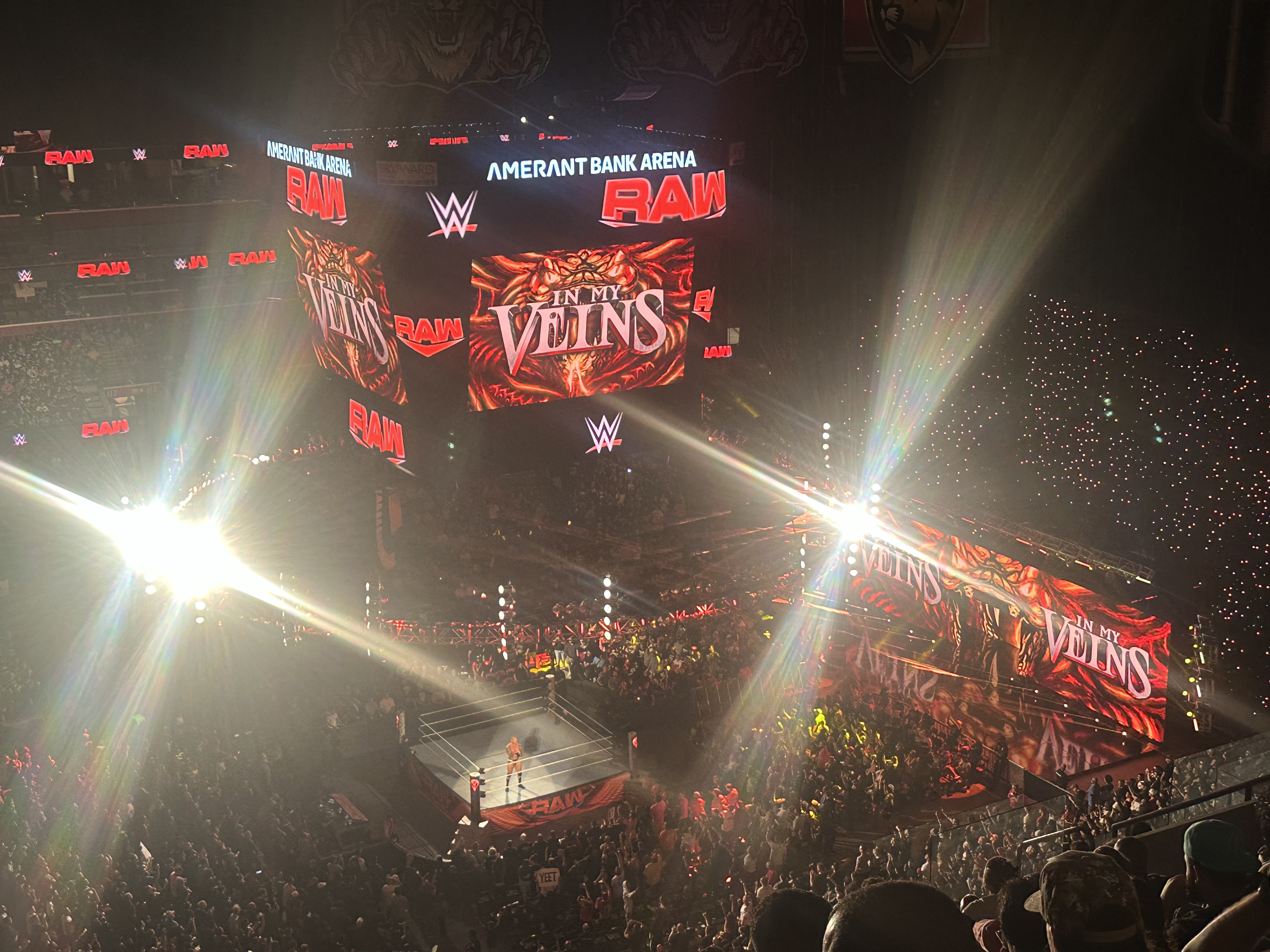
Randy Orton entrance at Amerant Bank Arena on August 19, 2024

In September 2021, the ring-ropes changed color from red to white, which was also reflected on SmackDown. On November 22 of that year, an updated version of the 2019 logo was introduced, alongside new graphics. The theme song was changed to "Greatness" by Vo Williams, which remained its theme song until November 20, 2023, when it was changed to "Born to Be" by def rebel, the artist behind WWE's music input for its programming, which is performed by Supreme Madness. Bumper themes included "Survival", "Eye of an Warrior" and "Legacy".

In February 2022, Raw and NXT temporarily moved to Syfy in the United States due to USA Network broadcasting coverage of the 2022 Winter Olympics. A similar arrangement occurred in August 2024 for the 2024 Summer Olympics.

When Raw moved to Netflix on January 6th, 2025, the ring mat became black while also filled with sponsorship logos around the mat.

=== Theme music ===
| Song title | Written and/or performed by | Dates used | Ref |
|---|---|---|---|
| "Monday Night Raw" | Roger H. Tallman | January 11, 1993 – March 3, 1997 | |
| "Raw" | Roger H. Tallman & Jim Johnston | 1993–1995 | |
| "The Beautiful People" | Marilyn Manson | March 10, 1997 – March 24, 1997 | |
| "Thorn in Your Eye" | WWE Superstars & Slam Jam | March 31, 1997 – March 25, 2002 | |
| "We're All Together Now" | WWE Superstars & Slam Jam | March 31, 1997 – March 25, 2002 | |
| "Across the Nation" | The Union Underground | April 1, 2002 – October 2, 2006 | |
| "...To Be Loved" | Papa Roach | October 9, 2006 – November 9, 2009 | |
| "Burn It to the Ground" | Nickelback | November 16, 2009 – July 16, 2012 | |
| "Tonight Is the Night" | Outasight | July 23, 2012 (only used for Raw 1000) | |
| "The Night"^{1} | CFO$ (Kromestatik) | July 23, 2012 – July 18, 2016 | |
| "Enemies" | Shinedown | July 25, 2016 – January 22, 2018 | |
| "My Songs Know What You Did in the Dark (Light Em Up)" | Fall Out Boy | January 22, 2018 (only used for Raw 25 Years) | |
| "Born for Greatness" | Papa Roach | January 29, 2018 – September 23, 2019 | |
| "Legendary" | Skillet | September 30, 2019 – October 12, 2020 | |
| "The Search" | NF | October 19, 2020 – November 15, 2021 | |
| "Greatness" | Vo Williams | November 22, 2021 – November 13, 2023 | |
| "I'm Good (Blue)" | David Guetta & Bebe Rexha | January 23, 2023 (only used for Raw is XXX) | |
| "Born to Be" | def rebel | November 20, 2023 – December 30, 2024 | |
| "4x4" | Travis Scott | January 6, 2025 – December 29, 2025 | |
| "Godzilla"^{2} | Eminem featuring Juice Wrld | January 5, 2026 – present | |

1. A remixed version was released on August 18, 2014.
2. Bold song titles are currently being used as the opening theme.

== Name-related lawsuits ==
The name for Raw was disputed in June 2009 when Muscle Flex Inc., a Los Angeles-based fitness company, had taken legal action against the WWE after a court ruled that some of WWE's trademarks related to Raw were similar enough to the In the Raw trademark that they caused confusion among Canadians. On June 18, 2008, the Canadian Intellectual Property Office then issued a final decision that found certain wares listed in the trademark application from WWE (No. 1,153,018) were confusingly similar and thus lacked distinctiveness from the Muscle Flex trademark, which Muscle Flex is in the process of acquiring. The WWE appealed the CIPO's ruling to the Federal Court of Canada, but failed to file the required documents by the deadline.

In August 2009, the court ruled in favor of Muscle Flex, Inc. that it was successful in defending its In the Raw trademark against the WWE. In a press release date issued on July 20, 2009, Muscle Flex Inc. disclosed that it was in possession of WWE Raw-labeled items that it believes directly infringe on its In the Raw trademark such as various CDs, VHS tapes, and a number of apparel items. According to the WWE's most recent reported financial quarter in 2009, combined sales of WWE's consumer products and digital media business segments produced $40 million in global revenues. In previous quarters, these numbers were even higher.

Similarly, in June 2017, the WWE issued a legal order to Raw Motors, an automobile repair company in Colwick, UK, over a logo that it claims infringes on one of its logos for Raw that was used from 2006 to 2012.

== Special episodes ==
Throughout its broadcast history, the show has aired episodes that have different themes. Some of them are yearly events such as the Slammy Awards. Others include tributes to various professional wrestlers who have recently died or retired from actively performing, as well as episodes commemorating various show milestones or anniversaries such as Raw 1000, which celebrated the 1000th broadcast. Raw also celebrated its thirtieth anniversary on RAW IS XXX on January 23, 2023.

== Roster ==
The wrestlers featured on WWE take part in scripted feuds and storylines. Wrestlers are portrayed as heroes, villains, or less distinguishable characters in scripted events that build tension and culminate in a wrestling match.

The primary commentators for Raw are Michael Cole and Corey Graves. Since 2024, they switch brands with Smackdown's Joe Tessitore and Wade Barrett for the last four months of the year. Additional commentary has been provided by Jim Ross, Jerry Lawler, Jonathan Coachman, Joey Styles, Tom Phillips, Kevin Patrick, Pat McAfee and others since its creation.

Since January 2025, Alicia Taylor is WWE Raw's lead ring announcer.

== Broadcast ==
In the United States, where most shows are taped in, the show airs live every Monday at 8 p.m. ET on Netflix. Occasionally, Raw is aired on same-day tape delay when WWE is on an overseas tour.

== Awards and nominations ==
| Year | Award | Category | Nominee(s) | Result | Ref |
|---|---|---|---|---|---|
| 2019 | 45th People's Choice Awards | TV show of 2019 | WWE Raw | Nominated | |

== See also ==
- List of professional wrestling television series
- List of longest-running American television series
