= Getting Away with Murder (song) =

Single by Papa Roach

from the album Getting Away with Murder
- Released: July 19, 2004
- Length: 3:12
- Label: Geffen
- Songwriters: Jacoby Shaddix; Tobin Esperance; Jerry Horton
- Producer: Howard Benson

Papa Roach singles chronology
"Time and Time Again" (2002)	"Getting Away with Murder" (2004)	"Scars" (2004)

Music video
- "Getting Away with Murder" on YouTube

"Getting Away with Murder" is the first single from the band Papa Roach's fourth studio album, Getting Away with Murder. The song shows the band's new sound and features no rapping at all, something that was used in Papa Roach's previous singles.

The song is also the former theme song for WWE Tough Enough. It was featured in the 2004 video game MechAssault 2: Lone Wolf It was also featured in the video game MX vs. ATV Unleashed in 2005. A "clean" remix of the song called "Getting Away With... (Gran Turismo 4 Vrenna/Walsh Remix)" was featured in Gran Turismo 4; it was a bit faster, had the heavily distorted guitars toned down, and had a backing whisper of the words "getting away" instead of "..with murder".

== Background ==
"I wrote it so you can take it in different ways", said singer Jacoby Shaddix. "It can be about when you're doing some shit behind some people in your life's backs and they don't know about it but it makes you feel like shit, which I've done. But it can also be about what's going on right now in the political world (in the Middle East), or about these big, huge corporations who are so corrupt".

== Music video ==
The video is performance-based, showing the band playing in a stock exchange hall with references filled with fans (including sexual imagery which led the band's lead singer Jacoby Shaddix to describe the video as "stocks and bondage" in an MTV2 interview). It was directed by Motion Theory.

- In the opening twenty seconds, all of the band members are shown as workers in the stock exchange.
- There are references to WarGames, Florida and Global Thermonuclear War calculations on the display screens in the background. Occasionally messages flash up during the video: "In God we trust" appears as a message and then alternates between that and "In guns we trust" as well as "In oil we trust". "Murder accomplished" is the last one to appear. It alternates between "Murder" and "Mission" accomplished. The characters in the big screen in the background also change shape periodically to resemble the American flag. Fighter jets, tic-tac-toe boards, and multiple copies of the skull and crossbones materialize on the big screen, as well as maps of the world and flying dots representing missiles. There are also Trading Places references too. Other messages appearing on the display screens in the background include WMD (weapons of mass destruction), MRDR (murder), EVLL (evil), NRON (Enron), 'BSH' and 'CHNY'.
- The badges worn by the Stock exchange employees say 'SADM', 'NRA', 'CHNY', '4OIL' and 'NRON'.
- In the last two shots, the entire band can be seen with their hands and face covered in blood and Shaddix drops his microphone suddenly as if just realizing he has done something wrong.
- Lead singer, Jacoby Shaddix said he wanted the music video to be "political and sexy".

== Track listing ==
No.	Title	Length
1.	"Getting Away with Murder"
2.	"Harder Than a Coffin Nail"
3.	"Anxiety"
4.	"Getting Away with Murder" (video)
5.	"Chronicles of Riddick Trailer" (video)

== Charts ==
=== Weekly charts ===
Weekly chart performance for "Getting Away with Murder"
Chart (2004)	Peak position
Austria (Ö3 Austria Top 40)	28
Canada Rock Top 30 (Radio & Records)	9
Germany (GfK)	38
Netherlands (Single Top 100)	89
Scottish Singles Sales (Official Charts)	53
UK Singles (Official Charts)	45
UK Rock & Metal (Official Charts)	2
US Billboard Hot 100	69
US Alternative Airplay (Billboard)	4
US Mainstream Rock Airplay (Billboard)	2

=== Year-end charts ===
2004 year-end chart performance for "Getting Away with Murder"
Chart (2004)	Position
US Mainstream Rock Tracks (Billboard)	20
US Modern Rock Tracks (Billboard)	31

2005 year-end chart performance for "Getting Away with Murder"
Chart (2005)	Position
US Mainstream Rock Tracks (Billboard)	20
US Modern Rock Tracks (Billboard)	71

== Certifications ==
Certifications for "Getting Away with Murder"
Region	Certification	Certified units/sales
United States (RIAA)	Platinum	1,000,000^{‡}
^{‡} Sales+streaming figures based on certification alone.
