= Infest (album) =

Studio album by Papa Roach
- Released: April 25, 2000
- Recorded: September – December 1999
- Studios: NRG Studios (Hollywood, California)
- Genres: Nu metal; rap metal; rap rock; alternative metal; funk metal
- Length: 45:52
- Label: DreamWorks
- Producer: Jay Baumgardner

Papa Roach chronology
| Old Friends from Young Years (1997) | Infest (2000) | Lovehatetragedy (2002) |

Singles from Infest
- 1. "Last Resort" Released: March 7, 2000; 2. "Broken Home" Released: September 12, 2000; 3. "Between Angels and Insects" Released: January 30, 2001; 4. "Dead Cell" Released: November 21, 2001

Alternative cover
- Alternate cover used in several territories

Professional ratings
Review scores
| Source | Rating |
|---|---|
| AllMusic | 3/5 stars |
| Robert Christgau | (2-star Honorable Mention) |
| Entertainment Weekly | C− |
| Rolling Stone | 3/5 stars |
| Spin | 3/10 |

Infest is the second studio album and major label debut by American rock band Papa Roach. It was released on April 25, 2000, through DreamWorks Records. The sound on the album is mainly classified as nu metal and rap metal, with many songs containing rapped vocals and hip hop influences. It was certified 4× Platinum in the U.S. by the RIAA on December 6, 2024, making it the band's best-selling album, peaked at No. 5 on the Billboard 200 chart, and became the 20th highest-selling album of 2000 in the United States. Infest earned Papa Roach a Grammy Award nomination for Best New Artist.

== Background and recording ==
Prior to the release of Infest in 2000, Papa Roach released three EPs and one studio album. The band formed in 1993 as a funk metal and rap rock outfit. In 1994, Papa Roach released their first extended play titled Potatoes for Christmas. The seven song EP was originally released on cassette by dB Records. Potatoes for Christmas was later re-released on CD in 2003. Papa Roach's first studio album, Old Friends from Young Years, was released in 1997. The album failed to get the band a record deal. In April 1998, Papa Roach's second EP, 5 Tracks Deep, was released and contained five songs, only one of which, "Thrown Away", would later be re-recorded. In 1999, the band's third EP, ...Let Em Know!, was released. Only one track, "Walking Thru Barbed Wire", from the EP would not be re-recorded for Infest; the song, however, would be re-recorded for the band's third studio album, Lovehatetragedy (2002).

A demo was released in 1999 featuring the songs "Last Resort", "Broken Home", "She Loves Me Not" (the only song which would not be on Infest, instead being re-recorded for Lovehatetragedy), "Infest", and "Dead Cell". Papa Roach toured in 1999; the band had an underground fan base in California. Due to the underground success of the 1999 demo heard by in house producers Tim & Bob, they started working with the band and eventually got Papa Roach signed to DreamWorks Records.

Papa Roach went to the studio in late 1999 to record Infest. Though many songs including "Last Resort", "Broken Home", "Revenge", and "Dead Cell" had already been recorded, the band re-recorded them and made some changes to the lyrics. Three songs on the album, "Dead Cell", "Revenge", and "Snakes", feature additional musicians. Papa Roach completed recording the album by early 2000.

== Release and promotion ==
Infest was released in the United States and Canada on April 25, 2000, following radio play of "Last Resort". Infest debuted at No. 48 on the Billboard 200 albums chart. "Last Resort" became a massive hit throughout 2000 and peaked at No. 1 on the Billboard Modern Rock Tracks chart. With the massive mainstream success of "Last Resort", Infest reached No. 5 at the Billboard 200 albums chart and was certified quadruple Platinum by the RIAA. The follow-up singles from Infest, "Broken Home", and "Between Angels and Insects", also charted.

Following the success, Papa Roach went on several tours. In 2000, the band performed at tours including Vans Warped Tour and the Anger Management Tour with nu metal act Limp Bizkit and rap and hip hop acts such as E-40, Eminem, Ludacris, and Xzibit. In 2001, the band toured Ozzfest, where they performed main stage, on both the United States and United Kingdom tours. Papa Roach also played in some MTV shows during 2001. According to lead vocalist Jacoby Shaddix, the touring cycle for Infest lasted "two years". Infest was certified 4× Platinum by the RIAA and is Papa Roach's best-selling album to date.

== Music ==
The sound and genres utilized on Infest drew comparisons to Rage Against the Machine, with guitarist Jerry Horton saying: "There are basic similarities considering we both do hip-hop and rock, but there's so many other bands doing that, too." According to Loudwire: "The multi-faceted sound throughout the record allowed the band to experiment, involving rapping and funkier beats to a larger extent than many of their contemporaries." The publication said the album's styles represent nu metal and funk metal. In April 2023, when discussing the record's sound, Shaddix said: "We didn't sound anything like Staind. We didn't sound anything like Deftones. We didn't sound anything like Korn. Yeah, we were heavy, but we had our own brand of it."

The track "Dead Cell" includes additional vocals by Aimee Echo, formerly of Human Waste Project, and Rodney Duke, while both "Revenge" and "Snakes" include scratches by Adam "DJ AM" Goldstein. The closing track "Thrown Away" contains a softer, reggae-inspired version of the song "Tightrope", which starts at about 4:57.

== Lyrics ==
Infest's opening title track is, according to Shaddix, "the manifesto for the band." The lead single, "Last Resort", is about the attempted suicide of one of Shaddix's friends. Shaddix stated the event was "really traumatic for me to be around, because I'm a 17-year-old kid, and one of my best buds tried to kill himself. That was just fucking heavy. Heavy on me, and all of our friend circle." The second single, "Broken Home", was recorded in order for Shaddix "to kind of like be at peace with" his "childhood and this brokenness that I had inside myself, this hole in my heart growing up in a broken home and not having my father in my life, and that was a real struggle for me as a kid, and as a young adult." The fourth and final single, "Dead Cell", is, lyrically, about an individual who is "void of a soul."

The third single, "Between Angels and Insects", is about "Not being ruled by the dollar." Inspiration for the track came from the 1999 film Fight Club. "Blood Brothers" is, according to Shaddix, "about the crew, man! That’s about the brotherhood. This thing that we built over the years, as an independent band, these dudes were my family. They became my family straight up, and we still are, to this day." Shaddix stated in February 2021 about "Revenge", "I think that lyrically that song was born from abuse." He specified some of the abuse he endured as a child, which served as an inspiration for the song, came from "a babysitter of mine."

"Snakes" is about betrayal, with the inspiration coming from an individual Shaddix lived with who would use "rent money" given to him by Shaddix and "spend it on weed and whatever he wanted, and got us evicted from our apartment." "Never Enough" is "about self worth, and negative self perception, and selfishness, all at the same time." Shaddix stated about the meaning of the song, "when everything’s good in life, it's not enough. It's never enough. But then also, on the other side of the coin, saying like, do I deserve to have these things?" "Binge" is about Shaddix's experience with excessive alcohol consumption, which began after he engaged in underage drinking as a teenager.

The penultimate track, "Thrown Away", is about "the slings and arrows of ADHD and mental health." Shaddix said about recording "Tightrope", the hidden and final track on the album, "singer Jay Gordon from Orgy was hanging out at the rehearsal spot when we were doing this, and Jay Baumgardner, the producer, and they were both just like, 'That's it! Do that! That's interesting'."

The track "Legacy" is only available as the "clean edit" version on Infest, regardless of the album itself being the censored or uncensored release.

== Legacy ==
Shaddix said about Infest in 2015: "That's a solid fucking record, man. That record is a snapshot of who we were as young men, and I feel that there was a huge purpose in that record. That record took us on a wild ride across the world, and we sold a shit ton of records. It put a stake in the ground: 'P. ROACH is here'. I look back on that record, and I'm very proud of it."

In August 2016, Loudwire ranked the album at #1 on their "Papa Roach Albums Ranked" list, saying, "The brutally honest and aggressive lead single "Last Resort" became the band's signature song, while "Broken Home," "Between Angels and Insects" and "Dead Cell" kept the rising rockers on the airwaves for the majority of the next year, helping to cement their status as one of rock's brightest new acts."

In June 2020, Kerrang! included Infest on their "The 21 greatest nu-metal albums of all time - ranked" list, saying, "Jacoby Shaddix's Californian mob didn't just deliver an angst overload – they unleashed every ounce of feeling via arguably the catchiest songwriting nu-metal would ever see."

To commemorate the album's 20th anniversary, Papa Roach performed the album live in its entirety in studio to stream worldwide on June 20, 2020. The whole performance was released on YouTube on September 15, 2020.

In April 2022, Louder Sound ranked Infest at #18 on their "The 50 best nu metal albums of all time" list. Eleanor Goodman said about the album, "the lyrical content was surprisingly heavy coming-of-age stuff for a band whose singer went by the not-exactly-serious name of Coby Dick." In September the same year, the publication ranked the album as Papa Roach's best, saying "It might not be their most diverse piece of work, but Infest is undoubtedly Papa Roach’s finest moment."

In January 2025, Loudwire ranked Infest at #20 on their list of "The Top 50 Nu-Metal Albums of All Time (Ranked)", saying: "The multi-faceted sound throughout the record allowed the band to experiment, involving rapping and funkier beats to a larger extent than many of their contemporaries."

In February 2025, Megan Jenkins of Distorted Sound Magazine said about the album in a retrospective piece, "It earned them a Grammy nomination, multiple Platinum plaques, it’s hailed as one of the greatest nu-metal albums of all time, and it’s featured in multiple video games, tv shows, and movies. It feels as though everyone should have heard something from this album yet a full quarter of a century later, audiences discover PAPA ROACH because of Infest." The same year, Rae Lemeshow-Barooshian of Loudwire included the album in her list of "the top 50 nu-metal albums of all time", ranking it twentieth.

In 2025, guitarist Horton said about Infest: "we expected that the songs that we picked for singles would do well and we expected that we would be on the radio and we would be touring. It just didn’t happen the way that we imagined it would happen. We expected a build up, we expected to work it, to tour for a while and hopefully get to a certain level but it was completely different."

== Track listing ==
All tracks are written by Papa Roach.

| No. | Title | Length |
|---|---|---|
| 1. | "Infest" | 4:09 |
| 2. | "Last Resort" | 3:19 |
| 3. | "Broken Home" | 3:41 |
| 4. | "Dead Cell" | 3:06 |
| 5. | "Between Angels and Insects" | 3:54 |
| 6. | "Blood Brothers" | 3:34 |
| 7. | "Revenge" | 3:42 |
| 8. | "Snakes" | 3:29 |
| 9. | "Never Enough" | 3:35 |
| 10. | "Binge" | 3:47 |
| 11. | "Thrown Away": "Tightrope" (hidden track) | 9:36 |
| Total length: | | 45:53 |

Special Limited Edition bonus tracks
| No. | Title | Length |
|---|---|---|
| 12. | "Legacy" (clean) | 3:05 |
| 13. | "Dead Cell" (live) | 3:51 |
| 14. | "Last Resort" (clean) (CD-ROM video) | 3:19 |

== Personnel ==
Papa Roach

- Jacoby Shaddix – lead vocals
- Jerry Horton – guitars, backing vocals
- Tobin Esperance – bass, backing vocals
- Dave Buckner – drums, percussion

Additional musicians

- DJ AM – scratches on "Revenge" and "Snakes"
- Aimee Echo and Rodney Duke – background vocals on "Dead Cell"

Production

- Produced and mixed by Jay Baumgardner
- Engineer: David Dominguez
- Pro Tools and engineer: James Murray
- Mix engineer: D Rock
- Recorded and mixed at NRG Recording Services, North Hollywood
- Mastered by Howie Weinberg at Masterdisk, New York
- Art direction, photography and design: P.R. Brown at Bau-Da Design Lab LA

== Appearances ==
- "Blood Brothers" appeared in the 2000 video game Tony Hawk's Pro Skater 2, the 2001 film The One (along with "Last Resort"), the teaser trailer for the movie Evolution, and on the soundtrack of the 2006 video game FlatOut 2. The lyrics reference the Terminator's line "It's in your nature to destroy yourselves".
- "Never Enough" appeared in the 2001 racing video game Gran Turismo 3: A-Spec.
- "Last Resort" appeared in the second episode of Smallville and in an episode of Cold Case as well as other TV shows and movies (including The One), and American Dad! episode "The Hand That Rocks the Rogu". The 1999 demo version of is also available as a downloadable track in the Rock Band games.
- "Dead Cell" appeared in the films The Skulls and Queen of the Damned, and on the soundtrack for the 2001 video game Shaun Palmer's Pro Snowboarder.
- Guitar and bass guitar tab songbooks have been released for the album, both including the bonus track "Legacy".
- A heavier version of the song "Tightrope" was originally featured on the independent 1999 demo, Let 'Em Know.

== Charts ==
=== Weekly charts ===
Weekly chart performance for Infest
| Chart (2000–2001) | Peak position |
|---|---|
| Australian Albums (ARIA) | 50 |
| Austrian Albums (Ö3 Austria) | 12 |
| Belgian Albums (Ultratop Flanders) | 9 |
| Canadian Albums (Billboard) | 5 |
| Dutch Albums (Album Top 100) | 47 |
| Europe (European Top 100 Albums) | 18 |
| Finnish Albums (Suomen virallinen lista) | 9 |
| German Albums (Offizielle Top 100) | 5 |
| Irish Albums (IRMA) | 13 |
| New Zealand Albums (RMNZ) | 22 |
| Scottish Albums (Official Charts) | 9 |
| Swiss Albums (Schweizer Hitparade) | 16 |
| UK Albums (Official Charts) | 9 |
| US Billboard 200 | 5 |

=== Year-end charts ===
2000 year-end chart performance for Infest
| Chart (2000) | Position |
|---|---|
| Canadian Albums (Nielsen SoundScan) | 43 |
| US Billboard 200 | 27 |

2001 year-end chart performance for Infest
| Chart (2001) | Position |
|---|---|
| Belgian Albums (Ultratop Flanders) | 28 |
| Canadian Albums (Nielsen SoundScan) | 142 |
| Europe (European Top 100 Albums) | 59 |
| German Albums (Offizielle Top 100) | 64 |
| Swiss Albums (Schweizer Hitparade) | 90 |
| UK Albums (OCC) | 59 |
| US Billboard 200 | 116 |

=== Decade-end charts ===
Decade-end chart performance for Infest
| Chart (2000–2009) | Position |
|---|---|
| US Billboard 200 | 122 |

== Certifications ==
Certifications and sales for Infest
| Region | Certification | Certified units/sales |
|---|---|---|
| Austria (IFPI Austria) | Gold | 25,000^{*} |
| Canada (Music Canada) | 2× Platinum | 200,000^{^} |
| Germany (BVMI) | Platinum | 300,000^{‡} |
| New Zealand (RMNZ) | Platinum | 15,000^{‡} |
| Switzerland (IFPI Switzerland) | Gold | 25,000^{^} |
| United Kingdom (BPI) | Platinum | 300,000^{*} |
| United States (RIAA) | 4× Platinum | 4,000,000^{‡} |
Summaries
| Europe (IFPI) | Platinum | 1,000,000^{*} |
^{*} Sales figures based on certification alone.^{^} Shipments figures based on certification alone.^{‡} Sales+streaming figures based on certification alone.
