= Cherry Poppin' Daddies discography =

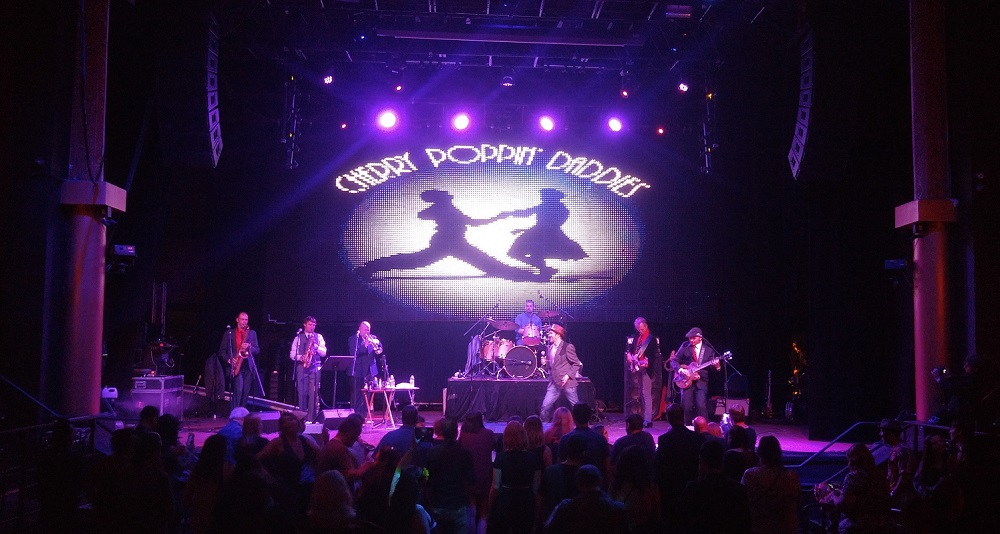
- Cherry Poppin' Daddies performing in California in 2017.
- Studio albums: 11
- Extended plays: 2
- Compilation albums: 2
- Singles: 5
- Music videos: 9
- Other appearances: 11

The discography of the Cherry Poppin' Daddies, a Eugene, Oregon-based ska-swing band, consists of ten studio albums, two compilation albums, five singles and three demo EPs, among other releases.

The Cherry Poppin' Daddies were formed in 1989 by singer Steve Perry and bassist Dan Schmid following the disbandment of their garage rock group Saint Huck, releasing their debut album Ferociously Stoned in 1990 on independent label Sub Par Records. After finding cult success in the Pacific Northwest region, the Daddies established their own label, Space Age Bachelor Pad Records, self-producing and self-releasing 1994's Rapid City Muscle Car and 1996's Kids on the Street, the latter proving to be a minor commercial breakthrough on the heels of the mid-1990s third wave ska revival, earning distribution through Caroline Records.

In 1997, the Daddies signed with Universal Music Group subsidiary Mojo Records to release Zoot Suit Riot, a compilation of their swing material. Arriving at the onset of the late 1990s swing revival, Zoot Suit Riot became the band's most commercially successful release to date, selling over two million copies in the United States while its eponymous single became a radio hit. Following the commercial failure of their 2000 follow-up Soul Caddy, the Daddies were eventually dropped from Mojo and entered a hiatus, resurfacing in 2008 to independently record and release their fifth studio album, Susquehanna. In 2009, the band briefly joined indie label Rock Ridge Music to release the ska compilation Skaboy JFK and a re-release of Susquehanna. The Daddies independently released their sixth studio album, a swing/rockabilly double album entitled White Teeth, Black Thoughts, in 2013, followed by the Rat Pack tribute album Please Return the Evening in 2014 and the Cotton Club-era jazz tribute The Boop-A-Doo in 2016. The band's eleventh album, the ska punk-oriented Bigger Life, was released in the summer of 2019. Their twelfth album, the all-swing At The Pink Rat, was released on July 26, 2024, followed by the all-ska Roma! Roma! on January 23, 2026 and the funk/psychedelia album Daughters of Montezuma on November 6, 2026.

== Studio albums ==
Title	Details
Ferociously Stoned	Released: November 20, 1990; Label: Sub Par Records/Space Age Bachelor Pad; Format: LP, CD, CS
Rapid City Muscle Car	Released: December 12, 1994; Label: Sub Par Records/Space Age Bachelor Pad; Format: CD
Kids on the Street	Released: February 6, 1996; Label: Space Age Bachelor Pad/Caroline Records (#4228); Format: CD, CS
Soul Caddy	Released: October 3, 2000; Label: Mojo Records; Format: CD, CS
Susquehanna	Released: February 19, 2008 (online release) June 10, 2008 (CD release) September 29, 2009 (Rock Ridge re-issue); Label: Space Age Bachelor Pad/Rock Ridge Music; Format: CD
White Teeth, Black Thoughts	Released: July 16, 2013 March 18, 2013 (PledgeMusic pre-release) May 5, 2014 (European release); Label: Space Age Bachelor Pad/People Like You; Format: CD, LP
Please Return the Evening — the Cherry Poppin' Daddies Salute the Music of the Rat Pack	Released: July 29, 2014; Label: Space Age Bachelor Pad; Format: CD
The Boop-A-Doo	Released: January 22, 2016; Label: Space Age Bachelor Pad; Format: CD, LP
Bigger Life	Released: June 14, 2019; Label: Space Age Bachelor Pad; Format: CD, LP
At The Pink Rat	Released: July 26, 2024; Label: Space Age Bachelor Pad; Format: LP
Roma! Roma!	Released: January 23, 2026; Label: Space Age Bachelor Pad; Format: LP
Daughters of Montezuma	Released: November 6, 2026; Label: Space Age Bachelor Pad; Format: LP

== Compilation albums ==
Title	Details	Peak chart positions			Certifications
Title	Details	US	AUS	NZ	Certifications
Zoot Suit Riot: The Swingin' Hits of the Cherry Poppin' Daddies	Released: March 18, 1997 July 1, 1997 (Mojo re-issue) January 13, 2017 (20th Anniversary re-issue); Label: Mojo Records/Space Age Bachelor Pad; Format: CD, CS	17	61	5	RIAA: 2× Platinum; MC: Gold; RMNZ: Gold
Skaboy JFK: The Skankin' Hits of the Cherry Poppin' Daddies	Released: September 29, 2009; Label: Rock Ridge Music/Space Age Bachelor Pad; Format: CD	—	—	—	
"—" denotes items which failed to chart.

== Extended plays ==
Title	Details
The Daddies	Released: 1992; Label: Sonic Recollections; Format: 7" vinyl
Vacationing in Palm Springs (split with Reel Big Fish)	Released: 1997; Label: Mojo Records; Format: 7" vinyl

== Singles ==
List of singles, with selected chart positions, showing year released and album name
Title	Year	Peak chart positions					Album
Title	Year	US Airplay	US Mod	US Adult	US Pop	Aus	Album
"Zoot Suit Riot"	1997	41	15	16	32	57	Zoot Suit Riot
"Brown Derby Jump"	1998	—	—	—	—	—	Zoot Suit Riot
"Here Comes the Snake"	1998	—	—	—	—	—	Zoot Suit Riot
"Diamond Light Boogie"	2000	—	—	—	—	—	Soul Caddy
"I Love American Music"	2013	—	—	—	—	—	White Teeth, Black Thoughts
"Gym Rat"	2019	—	—	—	—	—	Bigger Life
"Diesel PunX"	2019	—	—	—	—	—	Bigger Life
"Yankee Pride"	2019	—	—	—	—	—	Bigger Life
"Faux Nice, Mock Fancy"	2020	—	—	—	—	—	Non-album single
"Platform Shoes"	2020	—	—	—	—	—	White Teeth, Black Thoughts
"Switchin' to Glide"	2020	—	—	—	—	—	Non-album single
"Lowdown Appreciator"	2023	—	—	—	—	—	At The Pink Rat
"Kingsized"	2023	—	—	—	—	—	At The Pink Rat
"Party Shake"	2023	—	—	—	—	—	At The Pink Rat
"Thrill Thing"	2023	—	—	—	—	—	At The Pink Rat
"Kings of Swing"	2023	—	—	—	—	—	At The Pink Rat
"Undecided"	2024	—	—	—	—	—	At The Pink Rat
"Hey Goombah"	2024	—	—	—	—	—	At The Pink Rat
"Royal Street Swingdown"	2024	—	—	—	—	—	At The Pink Rat
"Take It Off, Stella"	2024	—	—	—	—	—	At The Pink Rat
"Shooting Bullets at a Bell"	2024	—	—	—	—	—	At The Pink Rat
"When You're a Clown"	2024	—	—	—	—	—	At The Pink Rat
"Hater's Envy" / "Waterman"	2025	—	—	—	—	—	Roma! Roma!
"Up from the Downside" / "Snowbells"	2025	—	—	—	—	—	Roma! Roma!
"Get Back in Line" / "Stay Funky"	2025	—	—	—	—	—	Roma! Roma!
"Final Girl" / "Escape from Flaccid Island"	2025	—	—	—	—	—	Roma! Roma!
"Face the Breeze"	2025	—	—	—	—	—	Roma! Roma!
"Daughters of Montezuma"	2026	—	—	—	—	—	Daughters of Montezuma
"Sugar Boy"	2026	—	—	—	—	—	Daughters of Montezuma
"Sweet Formaldehyde"	2026	—	—	—	—	—	Daughters of Montezuma
"Wood Wizard"	2026	—	—	—	—	—	Daughters of Montezuma
"Secret Hippy"	2026	—	—	—	—	—	Daughters of Montezuma
"—" denotes items which failed to chart.

== Music videos ==
Year	Title	Director	Album
1997	"Zoot Suit Riot"	Isaac Camner	Zoot Suit Riot: The Swingin' Hits of the Cherry Poppin' Daddies
1998	"Zoot Suit Riot"	Gregory Dark	Zoot Suit Riot: The Swingin' Hits of the Cherry Poppin' Daddies
1998	"Brown Derby Jump"	Jamie Caliri	Zoot Suit Riot: The Swingin' Hits of the Cherry Poppin' Daddies
2013	"I Love American Music"	Jesse Locke & Steve Perry	White Teeth, Black Thoughts
2013	"The Babooch"	Jesse Locke & Steve Perry	White Teeth, Black Thoughts
2013	"Huffin' Muggles"	Jesse Locke & Steve Perry	White Teeth, Black Thoughts
2014	"Doug the Jitterbug"	Jesse Locke	White Teeth, Black Thoughts
2014	"Come Fly with Me"	Steve Perry	Please Return the Evening
2014	"Fly Me to the Moon"	Steve Perry	Please Return the Evening
2015	"Brown Flight Jacket"	Jesse Locke & Steve Perry	White Teeth, Black Thoughts
2016	"That Lindy Hop"	Steve Perry	The Boop-A-Doo
2017	"The Ding-Dong Daddy of the D-Car Line"	Steve Perry	Zoot Suit Riot: 20th Anniversary Edition
2019	"Gym Rat"	Jesse Locke & Steve Perry	Bigger Life
2019	"Diesel PunX"	Jesse Locke & Steve Perry	Bigger Life
2019	"Yankee Pride"	Jesse Locke & Steve Perry	Bigger Life
2020	"Platform Shoes"	Jesse Locke & Steve Perry	White Teeth, Black Thoughts
2020	"Switchin' to Glide"	Steve Perry	Non-album track
2026	"Sugar Boy"	Steve Perry	Daughters of Montezuma
2026	"Wood Wizard"	Jesse Locke	Daughters of Montezuma

=== Videography ===
- "Brown Derby Jump" (live), performed in the documentary Punk Rock Summer Camp (1998)
- AMC Swings!, television special hosted by and featuring the music of the Cherry Poppin' Daddies (1999)
- "Zoot Suit Riot" (live), performed on the instructional VHS Swing: The Romance of Dance (1999)

== Other appearances ==
=== Non-album tracks ===
The following are songs that did not receive a release on a studio or compilation album.

Year	Song	Source
1993	"Nobody's Friend" – 5:17	I-5 Killers, Volume 2 compilation (Schizophonic Records)
1993	"The Graduate" – 3:24	Northwest Ungrunge compilation (Elemental)
1997	"Sound System" (Operation Ivy) – 2:06	Take Warning: The Songs of Operation Ivy tribute album (Glue Factory)
1998	"Butch the Gay Santa Claus" – 1:37	Kevin and Bean: Santa's Swingin' Sack compilation (KROQ)
1998	"Cool Yule" (Louis Armstrong)	I'll Be Home for Christmas soundtrack
1998	"Jump in the Line (Shake, Shake Senora)" (Harry Belafonte) – 3:45	BASEketball: The Original Motion Picture Soundtrack (Mojo)
1999	"Brown Derby Jump" (live) – 3:22	Jingle Ball '98: The CD (KFMB)
1999	"Zoot Suit Riot" (live) – 4:03	Jingle Ball '98: The CD (KFMB)
1999	"Here Comes the Snake" (remix) – 2:56	Three to Tango: Music From And Inspired By The Motion Picture (Atlantic)
1999	"So Long Toots" (alternate recording) – 2:31	Blast from the Past: Music from the Original Motion Picture (Capitol)
2001	"Jake's Frilly Panties" – 2:48	Exclusive fan club download on official website from 2001 through April 2006. A remixed version was later released on 2013's White Teeth, Black Thoughts.
2019	"Faux Nice, Mock Fancy" – 4:00	A glam rock-styled demo which was released as an exclusive download with pre-orders of Bigger Life on Spotify. A re-recorded version was later released as a standalone single in January 2020, which later appeared on their 2026 album Daughters of Montezuma.
