= Skaboy JFK =

Skaboy JFK: The Skankin' Hits of the Cherry Poppin' Daddies

Compilation album by Cherry Poppin' Daddies
- Released: September 29, 2009
- Recorded: 1994–2009
- Studios: Gung Ho Studios, Eugene, Oregon
- Genre: Ska
- Length: 37:27
- Labels: Space Age Bachelor Pad, Rock Ridge
- Producer: Steve Perry

Cherry Poppin' Daddies chronology
Susquehanna (2008)	Skaboy JFK: The Skankin' Hits of the Cherry Poppin' Daddies (2009)	White Teeth, Black Thoughts (2012)

Skaboy JFK: The Skankin' Hits of the Cherry Poppin' Daddies is the second compilation album by the Cherry Poppin' Daddies. The album was released in September 2009 by Rock Ridge Music. Like Zoot Suit Riot (1997), Skaboy JFK is a collection of the band's ska material, compiling tracks from their first five studio albums with four new bonus tracks.

== Overview ==
Skaboy JFK is a compilation of the ska and ska-influenced songs featured on the Daddies' previous studio albums, spanning from 1994's Rapid City Muscle Car to 2008's Susquehanna, excluding only the band's 1990 debut Ferociously Stoned. The songs on the compilation cover a broad range of styles of ska music, including traditional Jamaican-influenced ska, reggae, third wave ska and ska punk.

As the Daddies' former label Jive Records own the master recordings of the band's late 1990s work, three songs - "Soul Cadillac" and "End of the Night" from 2000's Soul Caddy and "2:29" from 1997's Vacationing in Palm Springs - were fully re-recorded for inclusion on this compilation. Notably, "2:29" was re-recorded and re-arranged from a fast ska punk style to a mellower reggae tempo.

== Production history ==
Singer-songwriter Steve Perry first announced interest in a ska compilation in a November 2008 interview shortly after the release of Susquehanna, saying that fans had been suggesting the concept for years as a companion piece to Zoot Suit Riot. Perry further noted that such a project could help show a different side of the Daddies than the swing material the band is primarily recognized for and would hopefully reconnect them with the ska scene in which they had first established themselves at the start of their career.

On February 22, 2009, Perry confirmed the project on the band's MySpace page, revealing that production would take place in March and the album - under the working title of simply "The Skankin' Hits of the Cherry Poppin' Daddies" - would possibly include as many as 15 songs. He noted the cover art would revisit touches of the Zoot Suit Riot artwork, explaining "...if they look somewhat similar maybe people will put 2 + 2 together and understand that these were special records we did in order to showcase one style, as opposed to getting a wrong impression of what the band is about generally".

In mid-2009, the Daddies signed to independent label Rock Ridge Music, home of former Mojo labelmates Reel Big Fish (who, coincidentally, would also release a ska compilation of re-recorded tracks due to an identical conflict with Jive Records), for the national release and distribution of both Skaboy JFK and a re-issue of Susquehanna. Both records were simultaneously released on September 29, 2009.

The newly recorded tracks for Skaboy JFK marked the last recorded appearances of longtime lead guitarist Jason Moss, who joined the Daddies in 1992, and tenor saxophonist Jesse Cloninger, who had joined in 2008, as both musicians would leave the band in 2010.

== Reception ==
Professional ratings
Review scores
Source	Rating
Allmusic	3.5/5 stars

Critical response to Skaboy JFK was generally positive. PopMatters called the album "excellent" and "packed with irresistible energy", singling out "Hi and Lo" and "Sockable Face Club" as particular highlights, while Blogcritics shared equal praise, citing it as "[proof] that swing and ska are far from dead". Goldmine described the music as "irresistible" and, along with Susquehanna, a re-establishment of the Daddies as "an ongoing (and worthwhile) entity". Metro Spirit summarized the record as "a very catchy, very fun and all around toe-tapping, finger-snapping, head-bobbing good time", and The Renegade Rip also complemented the music's energy, again giving particular praise to "Hi and Lo" and "Sockable Face Club", though claiming that eventually the ska rhythms "became predictable and the melodies ran together".

On the negative side of the critical spectrum, a separate reviewer on Blogcritics derided the album's content as "[sounding] like every other modern ska track I’ve ever heard", while Wonka Vision gave Skaboy JFK a score of 2/5, describing it as "run-of-the-mill" and a reminder that "ska isn't anything special"...though listing "Hi and Lo" and "Sockable Face Club" as among the more memorable tracks on the album.

== Track listing ==
All tracks are written by Steve Perry.

No.	Title	Length
1.	"Skaboy JFK"	2:27
2.	"Hi and Lo"	3:38
3.	"Soul Cadillac" (re-recording)	3:29
4.	"Sockable Face Club"	3:47
5.	"Slapstick"	4:34
6.	"End of the Night" (re-recording)	2:45
7.	"Pool Shark"	3:02
8.	"Cosa Nostra"	3:52
9.	"Don Quixote"	3:03
10.	"Hammerblow"	3:00
11.	"2:29" (re-recording)	2:49
12.	"Say It To My Face"	3:01
Total length:		37:27

=== Previous availability ===
Original album	Year	Track											
Original album	Year	1	2	3	4	5	6	7	8	9	10	11	12
Ferociously Stoned	1990												
Rapid City Muscle Car	1994				X								
Kids on the Street	1996								X	X			X
Soul Caddy	2000			X			X						
Susquehanna	2008		X								X		
Previously unreleased	2009	X				X		X				X	

- Previous recordings of "2:29" and "Hi and Lo" first appeared on the Daddies/Reel Big Fish split 7-inch Vacationing in Palm Springs (1997).

== Credits ==
=== Cherry Poppin' Daddies ===
Band roster at the time of release of this compilation album:

- Steve Perry - lead vocals, rhythm guitar
- Dan Schmid - bass guitar
- Dana Heitman - trumpet, trombone
- Jason Moss - lead guitar
- Dustin Lanker - keyboards
- Joe Manis - alto saxophone
- Jesse Cloninger - tenor saxophone
- Kevin Congleton - drums

=== Musicians ===
Instrument	Musician	Track											
Instrument	Musician	1	2	3	4	5	6	7	8	9	10	11	12
vocals/guitar	Steve Perry	X	X	X	X	X	X	X	X	X	X	X	X
bass	Dan Schmid	X	X	X	X	X	X	X	X	X	X	X	X
trumpet/trombone	Dana Heitman	X	X	X	X	X	X	X	X	X	X	X	X
guitar	Jason Moss	X	X	X	X	X	X	X	X	X	X	X	X
keyboards	Dustin Lanker	X	X	X		X	X	X			X	X	
keyboards	Chris Azorr				X				X	X			X
tenor saxophone	Jesse Cloninger	X		X		X	X	X				X	
tenor saxophone	Sean Flannery		X						X		X		
tenor saxophone	Adrian Baxter				X					X			X
alto/tenor saxophone	Joe Manis	X	X	X		X	X	X			X	X	
alto/tenor saxophone	Rex Trimm								X	X			X
alto/tenor saxophone	Brooks Brown				X								
drums	Jason Palmer	X		X		X	X	X				X	X
drums	Tim Donahue		X								X		
drums	Adam Glogauer									X			
drums	Sean Oldham								X				
drums	Brian West				X								

=== Production ===
- Mastered by Brad Blackwood at Euphonic Mastering, Memphis, Tennessee
- Recorded and Mixed by Bill Barnett at Gung Ho Studios, Eugene, Oregon

== See also ==
- Zoot Suit Riot: The Swingin' Hits of the Cherry Poppin' Daddies, an earlier compilation focusing on the Daddies' swing material.
