= Bigger Life =

2019 album by Cherry Poppin' Daddies

Studio album by Cherry Poppin' Daddies
- Released: June 14, 2019
- Recorded: Gung Ho Studio in Eugene, Oregon
- Length: 48:38
- Label: Space Age Bachelor Pad
- Producer: Steve Perry

Cherry Poppin' Daddies chronology
The Boop-A-Doo (2016)	Bigger Life (2019)	At the Pink Rat (2024)

Bigger Life is the ninth studio album and eleventh album overall by American ska-swing band the Cherry Poppin' Daddies, independently released on Space Age Bachelor Pad Records on June 14, 2019.

Following three successive swing and jazz albums released throughout the 2010s, Bigger Life heralded a return to the punk rock influences which defined the Daddies' earliest albums, featuring a dominant musical focus on ska, ska punk and psychobilly as well as lyrical content both critically and satirically addressing contemporary American politics.

== Overview ==
Bigger Life marked a return to the Daddies' eclectic multi-genre album format, their first such record since Susquehanna in 2008. Described by singer-songwriter Steve Perry as "a throwback to our Ferociously Stoned days, mixed with our skacore influence of the Kids on the Street era", much of the music on Bigger Life is influenced by ska and punk rock, exploring sub-genres including ska punk, psychobilly and Celtic punk while also featuring brief stylistic detours into electro-funk ("Schizo") and the Daddies' best-known musical staples of swing ("The Fixer") and jazz ("Bigger Life").

Lyrically, Bigger Life is one of the Daddies' most overtly political albums, addressing such topics as race relations, class consciousness, the opioid crisis and the erosion of democratic ideals. Perry further elaborated on these themes in an article by Paste about Trump-era protest music, stating his intent with Bigger Life on being "deeply critical of racist and authoritarian elements in the U.S., while also being empathetic to working-class frustration, given the reality that the working class is being economically pressured and manipulated simultaneously by an emboldened nationalist movement and their sources of propaganda".

In an entry from the Daddies' official mailing list, Perry noted that he was significantly influenced by The Kinks' 1969 concept album Arthur (Or the Decline and Fall of the British Empire) while writing Bigger Life, as well as the political satire of the Roman poet Juvenal and German dadaist artist George Grosz.

== Production history ==
After the release of White Teeth, Black Thoughts in 2013, the Daddies spent the next several years on the road and in the studio focusing exclusively on swing and jazz music, releasing the Rat Pack tribute Please Return the Evening and the Tin Pan Alley tribute The Boop-A-Doo in 2014 and 2016, respectively, each with an accompanying stage show showcasing the material. In a 2014 interview with The Huffington Post, singer-songwriter Steve Perry mentioned beginning work on new, non-swing original material, describing his ambitions of making a politically oriented "psychobilly/Zappa/American Idiot/R. Crumb-type record" and emphasizing an interest in utilizing rockabilly and psychobilly.

Fewer updates were given on the status of this album as the Daddies continued to promote their tribute albums, though Perry confirmed on Twitter in January 2016 that he was still writing and that the new songs were "rockin & funky", comparing them to the band's debut album Ferociously Stoned. By Spring 2017, an article by The Register-Guard revealed a working title of Big Mouth Royalty, as well as a description of its musical content as "swing-ska-rockabilly-psychobilly". During this time, the Daddies embarked on a tour celebrating the 20th anniversary of their 1997 Zoot Suit Riot compilation, where two new ska punk songs - "Big Mouth Royalty" and "Steamrolled" - were debuted.

In February 2018, Perry publicly announced on the Daddies' social media that his wife Yvette had been diagnosed with stage IV colorectal cancer. As a result, band activity was placed on hiatus as Perry acted as his wife's caretaker. As the year progressed and Yvette Perry responded positively to cancer treatments and surgery, the Daddies resumed sporadic touring and recording at a slower pace. The album - eventually titled Bigger Life - is dedicated to Yvette "Cherry" Perry.

On May 8, 2018, Perry announced on Twitter that mixing had begun on Bigger Life. The album was finally and formally announced on March 12, 2019, with the release of the album's first single and music video, the ska punk song "Gym Rat", along with a confirmed release date of June 14.

== Release and promotion ==
Bigger Life was released on June 14, 2019.

=== Singles and music videos ===
As of June 2019, three music videos have been released in promotion of Bigger Life, each co-directed by Daddies frontman Steve Perry and Jesse Locke of the Bend, Oregon-based production company AMZ Productions, who also produced the music videos for the Daddies' 2013 album White Teeth, Black Thoughts.

"Gym Rat" was released as Bigger Life's first music video on March 12, 2019, and issued as a downloadable single on March 15, marking the first ska single of the Daddies' career and their second non-ska single after the glam rock-styled "Diamond Light Boogie" from 2000's Soul Caddy. Boasting a "pummeling, burly skacore vibe" which Perry likened to "AC/DC meets Fishbone", "Gym Rat" is a satire of fitness culture which Perry clarified as condemning "the awful 'rule' that I believe many people in this culture have deeply internalized; which is that until your body is 100% perfect you will never feel worthy of love". The music video, shot at Genuine Fitness in Eugene, Oregon, depicts the band members clad in exaggerated 1970s fashion performing the song alongside a variety of male and female bodybuilders.

The album's second music video, "Diesel PunX", was released on April 9 and issued as a single on April 12.

On May 7, the Daddies released the third music video from Bigger Life, the Celtic punk-styled "Yankee Pride", with the single following on May 10. Perry explained his intent with the song was delving deeper into the roots of the term "Yankee", a pejorative term for New Englanders which Perry - himself a New York native - associated with a sense of "stoicism", intending to "stir echoes of the past in response to the challenges and ethical waywardness of the present [...] to recall the Enlightenment values that engendered this Yankee experiment; the more upright values of freedom, tolerance and respect for all regardless of race or religion - of grit in the face of adversity". The music video portrays the Daddies performing the song in an industrial warehouse wearing a variety of costumes influenced by 1930s pulp magazine heroes such as Doc Savage, The Shadow and The Phantom, which Perry attributed to his admiration of "deliciously weird" bygone pop culture.

== Track listing ==
All tracks are written by Steve Perry.

No.	Title	Length
1.	"Diesel PunX"	3:54
2.	"White Man"	3:00
3.	"New Lincoln Brigade"	3:42
4.	"Yankee Pride"	3:56
5.	"The Fixer"	3:32
6.	"Bigger Life"	3:49
7.	"Billy Liar"	3:50
8.	"Steamrolled"	3:40
9.	"Big Mouth Royalty"	3:53
10.	"Gym Rat"	3:31
11.	"Rebel Stomper"	2:33
12.	"Schizo"	4:52
13.	"Cold Hard Cash"	3:29
14.	"Live Like an Animal"	4:17
Total length:		48:38

== Personnel ==
Cherry Poppin' Daddies

- Steve Perry - vocals, guitar, keyboards, vibraphone, percussion
- Dana Heitman - trumpet
- Dan Schmid - bass
- Willie Matheis - tenor saxophone, baritone saxophone
- Joe Freuen - trombone
- Zak Johnson - guitar, banjo, background vocals
- Josh Hettwer - alto saxophone, piccolo
- Oscar Watson III - drums

Additional musicians

- Paul Owen - drums on tracks 2, 3, 4, 7, 8, 9, 11 and 14
- Pat Howard - drums on track 12
- Kevin Congleton - drums on track 13
- Joe Weber - guitar on track 13
- Jean-Pierre Garan - keyboards on tracks 2, 5, 6 and 10
- Eric Albert - bagpipes on track 4
- Chuck Redd - vibraphone on track 13
- Bill Hulings - background vocals on 1, 2, 7, 10 and 12
- Matt Hettwer - trombone on tracks 1, 4, 7, 10 and 12
- Steve Sharp - trumpet on tracks 1, 2, 5, 10 and 12
- Billy Barnett - cowbell on track 13
- Mark Schneider - bass on track 5

Production

- Produced by Steve Perry
- Engineered and mixed by Bill Barnett at Gung Ho Studios in Eugene, Oregon
- Mastered by Bob Ludwig for Gateway Mastering
