= Brooks Brown =

American saxophonist

- Genres: Jazz, funk, ska, swing
- Occupation: Musician
- Instrument(s): Alto and tenor saxophone
- Years active: 1989–1994

Brooks Richard Brown is an American saxophonist, known for his work as a former member of the Eugene, Oregon band the Cherry Poppin' Daddies, which he co-founded with Steve Perry and Dan Schmid.

== Biography ==
While attending the University of Oregon in the early 1980s, Brown was active in numerous Eugene bands, most notably as the saxophonist for the soul group The Soulsations, the ska band The Hoodlums and lead singer for the funk-reggae band The Reason Why. A friend and classmate of Steve Perry, Brown assisted in developing and arranging several jazz and swing songs Perry was writing for a new band, helping recruit a horn section – including trumpeter Dana Heitman – to form the initial line-up of what would become the Cherry Poppin' Daddies in late 1988.

Brown graduated from the University of Oregon in 1986 with a Bachelor of Science in computer science. In 1994, as the Daddies were transitioning into full-time touring, Brown left the band to pursue a career. He later received both gold and platinum records for the Daddies' 1997 compilation Zoot Suit Riot, which predominantly featured songs he had performed on.

Brown currently resides in Portland, Oregon, and continues to play saxophone in several Portland jazz bands.

== Discography ==
- Cherry Poppin' Daddies – Ferociously Stoned – alto saxophone
- Cherry Poppin' Daddies – Rapid City Muscle Car – alto saxophone, clarinet
