= Zoot Suit Riot (song) =

1997 single by Cherry Poppin' Daddies

Single by Cherry Poppin' Daddies

from the album Zoot Suit Riot: The Swingin' Hits of the Cherry Poppin' Daddies
- Released: October 1997
- Recorded: 1997
- Genre: Swing; swing revival
- Length: 3:53
- Label: Mojo
- Songwriter: Steve Perry
- Producer: Steve Perry

Cherry Poppin' Daddies singles chronology
"Zoot Suit Riot" (1997)	"Brown Derby Jump" (1998)

Audio sample
- "Zoot Suit Riot": file; help

"Zoot Suit Riot" is a song by the American ska-swing band the Cherry Poppin' Daddies, written by vocalist and frontman Steve Perry for the band's 1997 compilation album of the same name on Mojo Records.

First issued as a single in October 1997, "Zoot Suit Riot" slowly gained radio momentum with the commercial growth of the late-1990s swing revival before ultimately hitting its peak in the summer of 1998, reaching #41 on Billboard's Hot 100 Airplay chart and #15 on the Modern Rock chart, while a surrealist music video became one of MTV's most played of the year, earning the Daddies a nomination for Best New Artist in a Video at the 1998 MTV Video Music Awards.

As of 2023, "Zoot Suit Riot" remains the only single of the Daddies' career to place on the Billboard charts.

== Overview ==
=== Background and recording ===
By the end of 1996, the formerly underground swing revival began drawing mainstream recognition in wake of the success of bands such as the Squirrel Nut Zippers and the hit film Swingers. As a result, the Cherry Poppin' Daddies, who were at that time primarily associated with the West Coast ska punk scene, began attracting a separate but sizable following for the prominent swing influences in their music. As means of having something new to sell on their next tour while the band was preparing for their next studio album, the Daddies quickly assembled Zoot Suit Riot: The Swingin' Hits of the Cherry Poppin' Daddies, a compilation album of only the swing tracks from their first three albums, recording four new songs—including "Zoot Suit Riot"—to round out a full-length record.

Due to the hurried production of the album and the band's lack of available finances, the song "Zoot Suit Riot" was recorded in one take. At the end of the recording, singer Steve Perry is heard saying "I think I'm about ready to sing it", which he was signifying to the engineer. "I had sung the tune and the engineer, my friend, pressed the button and said, 'I think it sounds pretty good, come in here and listen to it'", he revealed in a 2014 interview. "He said, 'We should keep that in and it will be our joke that we did this on the first take.' So we left it in the song and moved on. Unbeknownst to us, it became a big hit record", noting elsewhere that he "probably would of [sic] given it 2 or 3 more rips, probably slightly slower, if we had known the future back in 1996".

==== Music and lyrics ====
"Zoot Suit Riot" is written in the musical style of 1940s jump blues. Lyrically, the song's narrative is loosely based around the Los Angeles Zoot Suit Riots of the 1940s, a series of racially motivated assaults by American servicemen upon Mexican-American youths. Perry has cited the music of Lalo Guerrero, a Mexican-American musician associated with the pachuco and pachuca subcultures of the 1940s, as an influence on the song's content and style.

Although the Daddies have occasionally explored issues of race, violence and politics in their music, "Zoot Suit Riot" expresses no overt political or social commentary: in a 2009 interview, songwriter Steve Perry elaborated on its significance as an intended "anthem" for the swing scene, saying "I guess it seemed like a Pachuco rallying cry that could double as a dance anthem for those of us interested in swing music and culture at a time when nobody else was. It was an expression of a proud marginalism. That's not that deep, but there you go." In discussing the appropriation of the actual Zoot Suit riots, he wrote "To me, the simplified duality I used as I wrote the song was: we swingers were in solidarity with our counter cultural ancestors the 'Zoot Suiters' and we were opposed to the 'sailors' who represented the squares who weren’t yet hip to our growing communal jive".

=== Mainstream recognition ===
Zoot Suit Riot: The Swingin' Hits of the Cherry Poppin' Daddies was released independently on Space Age Bachelor Pad Records in March 1997. Following steady independent sales of the album which reportedly reached as many as 4,000 copies a week, the Daddies eventually signed a distribution deal with major label subsidiary Mojo Records and Zoot Suit Riot was re-issued and nationally distributed in July 1997. A promotional demo cassette featuring two swing songs from the album, "Dr. Bones" and "Brown Derby Jump", plus the ska b-side "Hi and Lo" was distributed to radio stations for possible airplay; "Zoot Suit Riot" was ultimately excluded from the tape as the band felt the song had no commercial potential.

As swing music began gaining mainstream commercial momentum by late 1997, Mojo chose to issue "Zoot Suit Riot" as a single and distribute it among modern rock radio stations. The Daddies, who were in preparation over recording a new studio album, ardently protested this move under the belief that a swing song would never receive airplay on mainstream radio and were concerned over losing money from its marketing. Mojo nevertheless persisted and "Zoot Suit Riot" soon found regular rotation on several major stations, notably Los Angeles' KROQ-FM, helping boost the single onto Billboard's Hot 100 Airplay chart and launch the Daddies into temporary mainstream notoriety.

Upon its initial release, some critics and swing fans noted a perceived musical and thematic similarity between "Zoot Suit Riot" and swing revivalists Royal Crown Revue's 1991 single "Hey Pachuco", which was also written about the 1943 Zoot Suit Riots though doesn't reference the event by name. Perry has said that the song had no influence on "Zoot Suit Riot", and that both bands just happened to draw from the same era of music and culture.

== Music videos ==
Steve Perry's face superimposed over a bed of skulls, one of many surreal images from the 1998 "Zoot Suit Riot" video.

Two separate music videos were filmed for "Zoot Suit Riot". The first, directed by Isaac Camner, was produced by the Daddies and filmed at the Café Du Nord nightclub in San Francisco, California. The video depicts the band and a zoot suited Steve Perry performing the song to a group of swing dancers and punk rockers in a smoky lounge, intercut with various shots of surrealist and occult imagery. Legendary disc jockey Al "Jazzbo" Collins has a brief cameo as one of the club's patrons, singing along to a verse from the song. Barry Ward, a former member of Gwar and Rich Kids on LSD, also makes a cameo appearance in the video.

Released in October 1997, the original video received minimal exposure, having aired only once on MTV as part of 12 Angry Viewers, a program in which twelve music fans critique a series of music videos, where it received almost unanimous disapproval.

In early 1998, as "Zoot Suit Riot" began climbing up the charts and the Daddies were gaining mainstream visibility, Mojo requested that a newer music video be filmed. Gregory Dark, an acclaimed director of alternative pornography, was selected to direct the video by Perry himself, as he was familiar with Dark's work from his previous job managing an avant-garde video store. Similar to the first video, the second video depicts the Daddies playing to a crowd of swing dancers and punk rockers, though the surrealist and occultic imagery is much more prominent, featuring such visuals as vampirism, animal sacrifice, foot fetishism and evil clowns. According to Perry, the video's surrealist theme stemmed from his love of avant-garde cinema, notably the films of Luis Buñuel. This music video was edited by future Academy Award winner Bob Murawski, then recognized for his editing work with horror director Sam Raimi and music videos by the Ramones and Sublime.

Dark's video became the version most associated with the song, becoming one of MTV's most requested videos of the year. Despite Zoot Suit Riot being the fourth album of the Daddies then nine-year career, the band was nominated for a Best New Artist in a Video award at the 1998 MTV Video Music Awards, though ultimately lost to Natalie Imbruglia's "Torn".

== In other media ==
"Weird Al" Yankovic parodied the song as "Grapefruit Diet" on his 1999 album Running with Scissors. Perry responded in a 2008 interview that though he didn't quite understand "why Weird Al is such an icon", he felt "honored" to have been parodied, noting "that was a sign that you had made it when Weird Al gave you a call and wanted to parody your song".

In 1999, bandleader and trumpeter Ray Anthony, who had been active during the original swing era and a one-time member of the Glenn Miller Orchestra, recorded a cover of "Zoot Suit Riot" on his album Swing Club, featuring Patrick Tuzzolino on vocals.

The song was also used in a 1999 promo to promote the animated Woody Woodpecker revival The New Woody Woodpecker Show.

Played in the movie Urban Legend during the party scene.

== Formats and track listing ==
Zoot Suit Riot US Promo CD
No.	Title	Length
1.	"Zoot Suit Riot"	3:53

Zoot Suit Riot Australian CD Single
No.	Title	Length
1.	"Zoot Suit Riot" (Radio Edit)	3:53
2.	"2:29"	3:43
3.	"Zoot Suit Riot" (Spanish Version)	3:55

Zoot Suit Riot UK CD Single
No.	Title	Length
1.	"Zoot Suit Riot"	3:53
2.	"2:29"	3:43
3.	"No Mercy for Swine" (Live)	3:35

Zoot Suit Riot UK 7" Single
No.	Title	Length
1.	"Zoot Suit Riot"	3:53
2.	"No Mercy for Swine" (Live)	3:35

== Chart positions ==
Chart (1998)	Peak position
Australia (ARIA Charts)	57
Canada Top Singles (RPM)	13
Canada Adult Contemporary (RPM)	23
UK Singles (Official Charts)	81
US Billboard Hot 100	41
US Pop Airplay (Billboard)	32
US Alternative Airplay (Billboard)	15
US Adult Pop Airplay (Billboard)	16

== Personnel ==
Cherry Poppin' Daddies

- Steve Perry – lead vocals
- Darren Cassidy – bass guitar
- Dana Heitman – trumpet
- Jason Moss – guitar
- Sean Flannery – tenor saxophone
- Brian West – drums
- Dustin Lanker – keyboards

Additional musicians

- Glen Bonney – trombone
