= Dana Heitman =

American musician

- Born: Portland, Oregon
- Genres: Rock, jazz, ska, swing
- Occupation: Musician
- Instruments: Trumpet, flugelhorn, trombone, backing vocals
- Years active: 1989–present

Dana Conrad Heitman is an American musician, known for his work as the trumpeter for the Eugene, Oregon ska-swing band the Cherry Poppin' Daddies, of which he has been a member since the band's formation.

== Biography ==
Heitman, a trained musician and member of several high school and college national merit bands, was attending the University of Oregon when he was recruited into the Cherry Poppin' Daddies, helping develop the band's prominent horn section. According to former Daddies guitarist Jason Moss in regard to the band's songwriting process, Heitman is responsible for writing and arranging the majority of the Daddies' horn lines, either by himself or working off pieces composed by frontman Steve Perry. After graduating from the university's school of music in brass instruments, Heitman continued his involvement with the Daddies, recording on every one of their albums to date and remaining the band's only constant member alongside Perry. At the height of the Daddies' mainstream popularity, Heitman received an endorsement from Bach.

When not touring with the Daddies, Heitman sits in with many local Oregon jazz and horn sections and has played in such Oregon-based bands as Swing Shift, The Essentials, Satin Love Orchestra, Caliente, Lutes and Keller and The Omar Torrez Band. Dana also plays trumpet for the nationally acclaimed University of Oregon Gospel Music Program.

According to the Daddies' 1994 press bio, from a standing position, Heitman can jump up and kick the doorjamb of a Ford truck twice with each foot without spilling his drink.

On September 9, 2017, the Daddies announced via their Facebook page that Heitman had developed a serious infection which threatened the loss of his leg. The following day, the band updated that Heitman had undergone surgery for tissue removal but still required extensive treatment. Heitman successfully recovered from the incident and resumed performing with the Daddies in 2018.

== Discography ==
=== Cherry Poppin' Daddies ===
See: Cherry Poppin' Daddies discography for complete listing

- Ferociously Stoned (1990) – trumpet
- Rapid City Muscle Car (1994) – trumpet, trombone
- Kids on the Street (1996) – trumpet, trombone
- Zoot Suit Riot (1997) – trumpet
- Soul Caddy (2000) – trumpet
- Susquehanna – trumpet
- Skaboy JFK (2009) – trumpet, trombone
- White Teeth, Black Thoughts (2013) – trumpet
- Please Return the Evening (2014) – trumpet
- The Boop-A-Doo (2016) - trumpet
- Bigger Life (2019) - trumpet
- At the Pink Rat (2024) - trumpet, cornet
- Roma! Roma! (2026) - trumpet, flugelhorn
- Daughters of Montezuma (2026) - trumpet

=== Miscellaneous ===
- Wrestling the Bald-Headed Champ – Billy Jack – trumpet, vocals (1995)
- New Pop City – Phamous Phaces – trumpet (2001)
- Keep It Going – Mad Caddies – trumpet (2007)
- We See Stars - The Jim Olsen Ensemble - trumpet (2014)
- Butterfly Blue - Halie Loren - trumpet (2015)
