= Cherry Poppin' Daddies =

American band

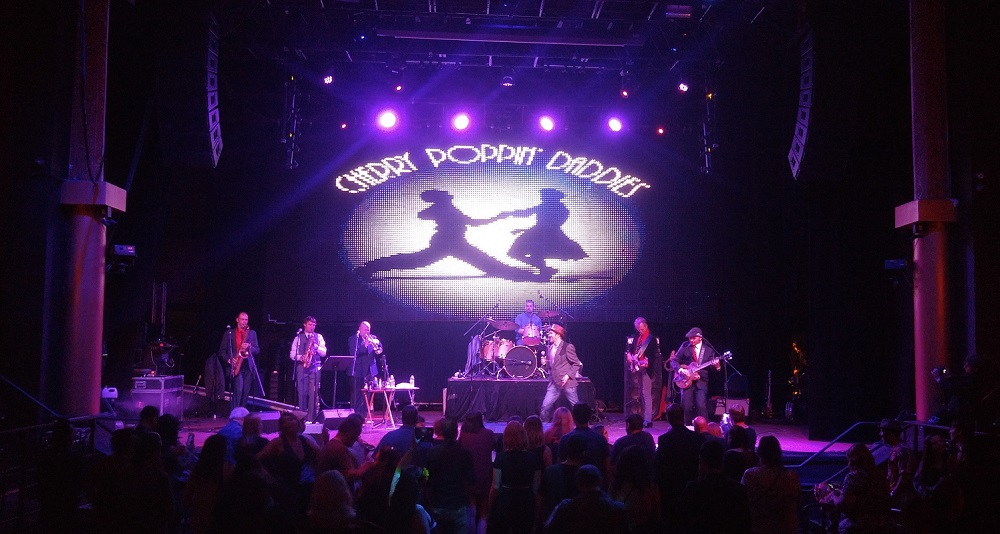
- Cherry Poppin' Daddies performing in California in 2017

Background information
- Origin: Eugene, Oregon, U.S.
- Genres: Swing revival; ska; rock; jazz; ska punk; funk rock
- Years active: 1989–2000; 2002–present
- Labels: Space Age Bachelor Pad; Mojo; Rock Ridge
- Members: Steve Perry; Dan Schmid; Dana Heitman; Willie Matheis; Jason Moss; Nik Barber; Kyle Molitor
- Past members: See: Cherry Poppin' Daddies former members
- Website: daddies.com

The Cherry Poppin' Daddies are an American swing and ska band established in Eugene, Oregon, in 1989. Formed by singer-songwriter Steve Perry and bassist Dan Schmid, the band has experienced numerous personnel changes over the course of its 30-year history, with only Perry, Schmid and trumpeter Dana Heitman currently remaining from the original founding lineup.

The Daddies' music is primarily a mix of swing and ska, contrastingly encompassing both traditional jazz-influenced variations of the genres as well as contemporary rock and punk hybrids, characterized by a prominent horn section and Perry's acerbic and innuendo-laced lyricism often concerning dark or political subject matter. While the band's earliest releases were mostly grounded in punk and funk rock, their later studio albums have since incorporated elements from many diverse genres of popular music and Americana into their sound, including rockabilly, rhythm and blues, soul and world music.

Initially drawing both acclaim and controversy as a preeminent regional band, the Daddies gained wider recognition touring nationally within the American ska scene before ultimately breaking into the musical mainstream with their 1997 swing compilation Zoot Suit Riot. Released at the peak of the 1990s swing revival, Zoot Suit Riot sold over two million copies in the United States while its eponymous single became a radio hit, launching the Daddies to the forefront of the neo-swing movement. By the end of the decade, however, interest in the swing revival had swiftly declined, along with the band's commercial popularity. The resultant failure of their subsequent album Soul Caddy contributed to an abrupt hiatus in 2000.

The Daddies officially regrouped in 2002 to resume part-time touring, eventually returning to recording with the independently released Susquehanna in 2008. In 2026, the band released their thirteenth and fourteenth studio albums, the ska album Roma! Roma! in January and the funk/psychedelia album Daughters of Montezuma in November.

== History ==
=== Formation ===
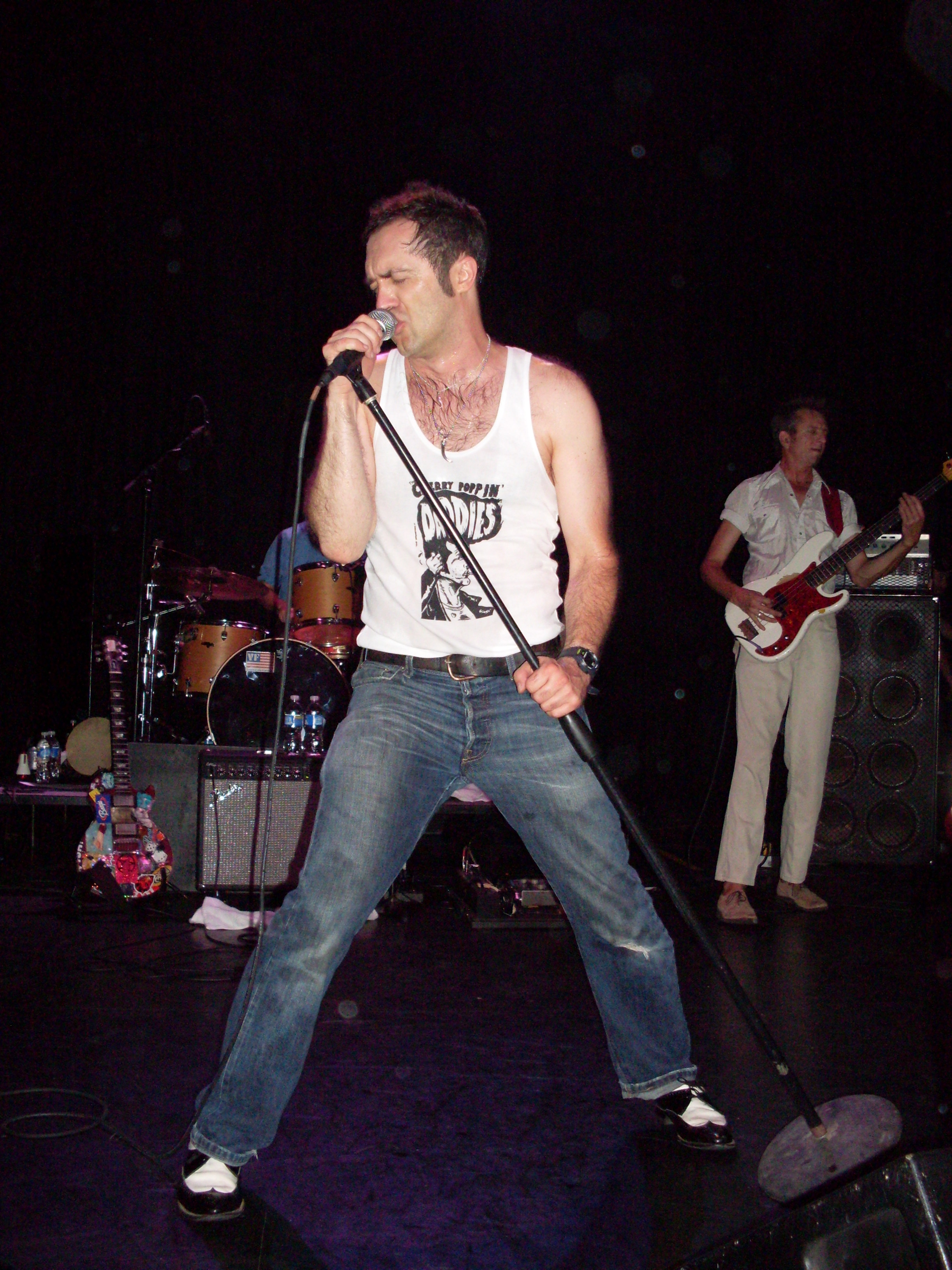
Singer Steve Perry and bassist Dan Schmid played together in several Eugene punk bands prior to forming the Daddies.

Following his high school graduation in 1981, Steve Perry left his hometown of Binghamton, New York, for Eugene, Oregon, to pursue track and field and a chemistry degree at the University of Oregon. A punk rock devotee since adolescence, Perry soon became engrossed in Eugene's underground music scene, where he eventually met and befriended musician and fellow University student Dan Schmid. Sharing similar musical ambitions and a mutual disinterest in school, the pair agreed to drop out of college together and start a band, forming the punk trio The Jazz Greats in 1983, which evolved into the Paisley Underground-styled garage rock group Saint Huck, which lasted from 1984 to 1987.

As the rise of grunge began to phase punk and hardcore out of the Northwest underground by the late 1980s, Perry set out to start a band that stood in defiant contrast to the shoegazing attitude of alternative rock, showcasing high energy dance music and Zappa-esque theatricality in an attempt to create something that an audience would react to viscerally instead of passively. Recruiting a horn section led by alto saxophonist Brooks Brown, Perry and Schmid formed their latest band Mr. Wiggles – named so after a Parliament song – in November 1988, playing their first show in Springfield as part of a benefit concert for workers of the Nicolai door manufacturing plant, who were then engaged in a union strike.

"My conception of punk", Perry told The Rocket, "was doing whatever the hell you wanted as long as it had vitality and wasn't overly stupid ... something exploratory and experimental", citing influence from genre-bending bands such as The Clash and the Meat Puppets. In their earliest incarnation, Mr. Wiggles played punk-inflected funk and soul music, though Perry's songwriting soon grew to draw heavily from a newfound interest in jazz, swing and rhythm and blues, combining punk rock and jazz arrangements in what Perry described was a desire to contemporize American roots music by infusing it with punk energy and using modernist, socially aware lyricism.

=== Early years (1989–1993) ===
In 1989, the title of Mr. Wiggles was retired when the band switched to a new name, "Cherry Poppin' Daddies", derived from jive slang the members had overheard on a vintage race record. The band played their first show as the Cherry Poppin' Daddies at the W.O.W. Hall in Eugene on March 31.

"Flovilla Thatch vs. the Virile Garbageman" (1990)
Sample of "Flovilla Thatch vs. the Virile Garbageman" from 1990's Ferociously Stoned, exemplifying the brass-heavy funk rock sound common of the Daddies' early material.

The Daddies sought to differentiate themselves from other Northwest rock bands of the era by having a horn section, featuring outlandish stage theatrics, and encouraging their audiences to dance. As Perry spoke of the Daddies' ideology, "It was our way of saying 'screw you' [to alternative rock 'phoniness'] ... we wanted to have fun, outrageously have a good blast without even thinking about it". Nonetheless, by the end of 1989, the Daddies had built a strong and loyal following within Eugene's counterculture, frequently selling out show and gathering critical acclaim."

The Daddies recorded their first demo cassette 4 From On High in July 1989, which included four tracks of funk rock and punk-influenced swing. The cassette sold over 1,000 copies in the Eugene and Portland areas, enabling the band to self-produce their debut LP Ferociously Stoned, released the following year. Fusing punk rock and jazz horns with funk grooves, Ferociously Stoned drew favorable critical comparisons to contemporaries Faith No More and the Red Hot Chili Peppers while also becoming a regional best seller. The album set a record for advance sales in Eugene's record stores and remained for over a year on The Rocket's Northwest Top Twenty list. The album helped expand the Daddies' Northwestern touring reach to as far as Alaska and Los Angeles by 1992.

==== Controversies and censorship ====
Cherry Poppin' Daddies' early performances often included flamboyant costumes, go-go dancers, phallic stage scenery, prop-heavy skits, or choreographed dance numbers. Perry—then performing under his mad scientist stage persona of "MC Large Drink"—would regularly engage in absurdist shock rock stunts, such as mock crucifixion and flag burning. One of the band's stage props was known as the "Dildorado" or "The Dildozer", a riding lawnmower modified to look like a human penis that mimicked ejaculation by shooting colorful fluids from its tip.

The cover art for the 1990 CD release of Ferociously Stoned, satirizing the controversy surrounding the band's name.

The band attracted controversy from Feminist groups, who condemned the band's performances as pornographic, citing their name and sexually charged lyricism as a promotion of sexism and misogyny. Perry disputed such claims, defending the controversial elements as misinterpreted satire. In what Eugene Weekly called "the most hotly discussed topic in the local music scene" and "the Eugene flash point for the growing national debate on censorship [and] free speech", the Daddies experienced controversy which nearly ended their burgeoning career. Vigilante protest groups habitually tore down or defaced the band's posters and sought boycotts against venues that would book the group and even newspapers which gave them a positive review. The Daddies' concerts routinely became sites of organized picketing and, on one occasion, a bomb threat. The band members themselves were frequent recipients of hate mail, threats and physical harassment: once, Perry claimed, an irate protester threw a cup of hot coffee in his face as he was walking down the street.

The Daddies initially refused to change their name on the grounds of artistic freedom, but a number of venues refused to book them due to the negative publicity. The band was temporarily banned from the W.O.W. Hall, where they had previously served as house band. The group later bowed to community pressure, and performed under the name "The Daddies", "The Bad Daddies," and similar variations within Eugene, but performed under their original name while touring elsewhere. As the Daddies retired the theatrical elements from their later live shows, the controversies surrounding the band waned and they returned to using their full name everywhere. Some minor complaints resurfaced during their mainstream success in the late 1990s.

=== National touring and independent success (1994–1996) ===
Throughout the early 1990s, the Daddies continued to remain a reliably popular and profitable draw in the Pacific Northwest and Northern California club circuit. Despite earning critical accolades from the local music press, including winning SF Weekly's title of "Best Unsigned Band" in 1994, the Daddies struggled to achieve wider recognition and distribution. Following a number of changes in their member and managerial lineups, the group embarked on their first national tour in the fall of 1994, which was highlighted by a set at the CMJ Music Marathon festival and convention in New York City. Upon returning to Eugene without any advantageous deals, the Daddies instead bought and constructed their own independent record label and recording studio, Space Age Bachelor Pad Records, where they self-produced and self-recorded their second studio album, Rapid City Muscle Car, which was released in December 1994. Described by Perry as "an idea album" and "very psychedelic", Rapid City Muscle Car was a distinct departure from the upbeat dance music vibe of Ferociously Stoned, showcasing a diverse range of disparate genres including ska punk, psychedelic rock, country, rockabilly, big band, hard rock and lounge. While Perry has retrospectively cited Rapid City Muscle Car as his personal favorite Daddies album, he revealed in a 1995 interview with the Los Angeles Times that the album sold "okay" but ultimately didn't surpass sales of Ferociously Stoned.

"Don Quixote" (1996)
Released during ska music's commercial resurgence, Kids on the Street's heavy ska punk influences helped make it the Daddies' then-most successful album.

The Daddies began dedicating themselves to full-time touring in 1995, playing over 200 shows across two or three national tours per year, including spots at prominent music festivals such as South by Southwest in Austin, Texas. As the band gradually built fanbases and markets around the country, they began attracting interest from several high-profile record labels, among which reportedly included Hollywood Records and producers including Roy Thomas Baker and Terry Ellis. However, when the suggestion or stipulation was made that the Daddies stick to one genre, Perry invariably rejected these offers, not wanting any outside influences controlling the band's sound. In a similar mindset, not wishing to be pigeon-holed into any specific scene or genre, Perry at first refused to tour with ska bands, though after a highly successful and well-received tour with Fresno ska band Let's Go Bowling, he acquiesced, and the Daddies eventually carved out a lucrative niche within the national ska scene, forming regular touring partnerships with the likes of The Mighty Mighty Bosstones, Reel Big Fish and Less Than Jake.

While the mainstream's growing focus on punk and ska by the mid-1990s presented the Daddies with further commercial opportunities, Perry still insisted foremost on maintaining complete creative control of the band. In February 1996, the Daddies released their third self-produced studio album on Space Age Bachelor Pad, Kids on the Street. Another musical departure from their previous record, Kids on the Street was mostly a reflection of the band's growing punk and ska influences, eschewing the Daddies' trademark brassy funk and swing in favor of guitar-driven rock, punk and ska, as well as stylistic detours into jazz and country. Distributed by noted indie label Caroline Records, Kids on the Street wound up becoming the Daddies' most successful release at the time, staying on The Rocket's Retail Sales Top Twenty for over seven months and even working its way onto Rolling Stone's Alternative Charts.

=== Zoot Suit Riot and major label years (1997–1999) ===
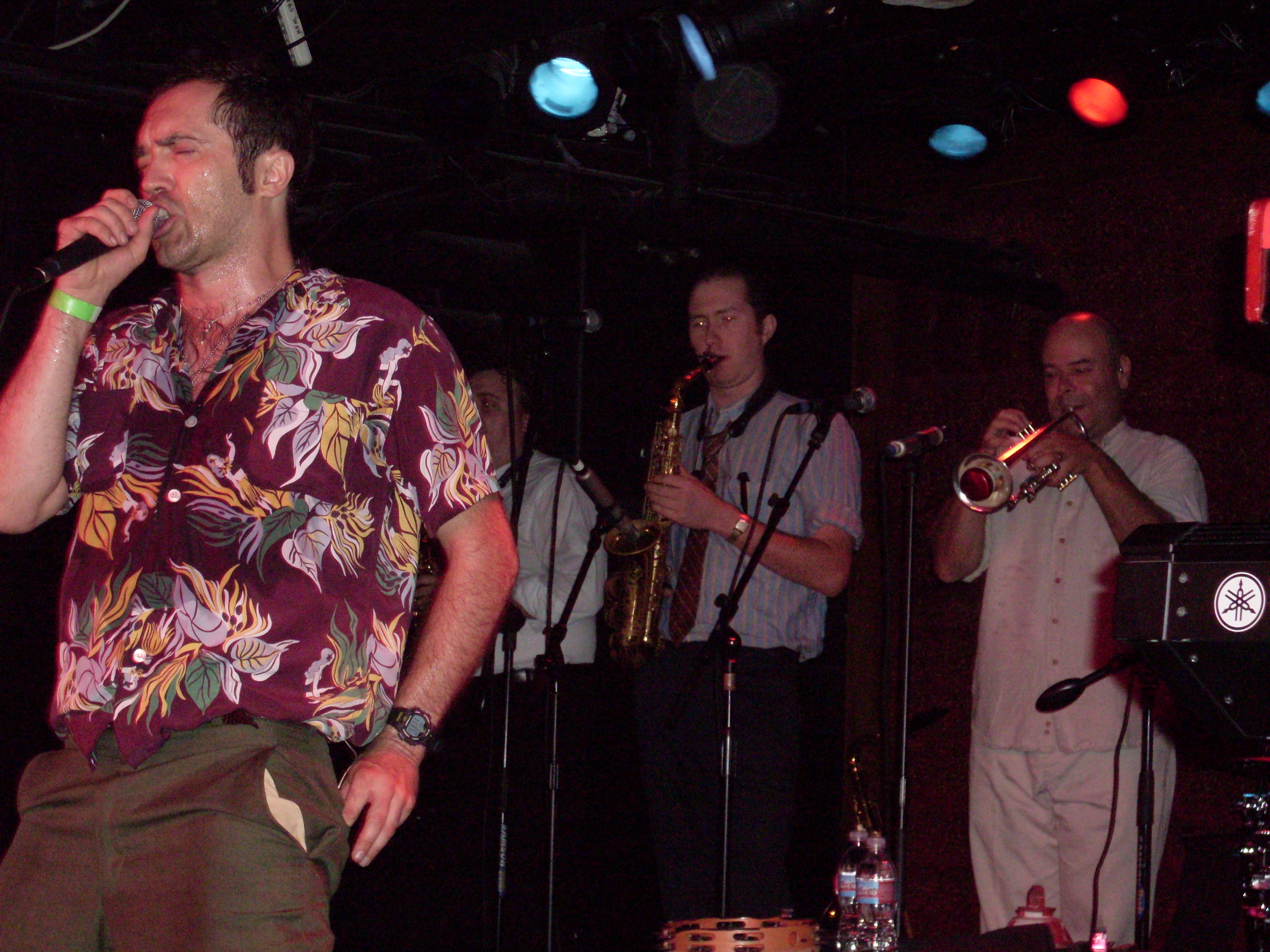
Throughout the Daddies' many lineup changes, Perry and trumpeter Dana Heitman have remained the band's two constant fixtures since their formation.

By late 1996, ska had broken through into the American mainstream as one of the most popular forms of alternative music, catapulting such major label bands as Reel Big Fish and The Mighty Mighty Bosstones into the national spotlight. The Daddies, however, without the support of a record label, were ultimately left on the fringes of commercial visibility. Although Kids on the Street had sold well for an independent release, the band had continuing difficulty securing press and distribution outside of the Northwest, while the pressure of full-time touring was inevitably becoming both a personal and financial strain on the members. The Daddies experienced at least fifteen lineup changes from 1996 to 1997, including the departure of original keyboardist Chris Azorr and co-founder Dan Schmid, leaving only Perry and trumpeter Dana Heitman as the sole remnants of the original lineup. Feeling they had finally hit a glass ceiling as an independent band, Perry said the Daddies were left with one of two options at this time: either sign to a label or break up.

Despite primarily playing ska tours during this turbulent period of their career, the Daddies suddenly began attracting a sizable and enthusiastic audience for their swing music, owing heavily to the coincident public interest in the formerly underground swing revival movement due in part to the success of the 1996 film Swingers. Although the Daddies had occasionally played shows with notable swing revival bands like Royal Crown Revue, they were not largely associated with the scene or subculture; when fans regularly began approaching the band's merchandise table asking which of their albums contained the most swing songs, the Daddies realized they lacked an album fully representing their swing side, prompting the band's manager to convince them to compile all of their swing songs onto one CD until they could afford to make a new album, using their available finances to record several bonus tracks for inclusion. The result, Zoot Suit Riot: The Swingin' Hits of the Cherry Poppin' Daddies, became an unexpectedly popular item as the band went on tour, reportedly selling as many as 4,000 copies a week through their Northwest distributors.

While stopped in Los Angeles during another tour together, Reel Big Fish arranged a meeting between their label Mojo Records and the Daddies in the hopes of helping the band obtain a distribution deal for Zoot Suit Riot. Following negotiations between Perry and Mojo, however, the label instead signed the Daddies to a two-album recording contract. Zoot Suit Riot was licensed and reissued by Mojo and given national distribution in July 1997, less than four months after its original release.

==== Mainstream breakthrough ====
As swing music steadily gained commercial momentum throughout 1997, sales of Zoot Suit Riot increased dramatically; by December, Mojo was moving 12,000 units per week. In January 1998, the label informed the Daddies of their decision to push the album's title track as a major single and distribute it among mainstream radio stations. The Daddies, who were beginning work on their next studio album, ardently protested this move, believing that a swing song would never receive airplay and were concerned that the band would end up having to recoup the marketing costs. Mojo nevertheless persisted, and much to the band's surprise, "Zoot Suit Riot" soon found regular rotation on stations such as Los Angeles' influential KROQ-FM, helping establish swing music in the mainstream and leading to its eventual commercial breakthrough, with the Daddies at the forefront. By mid-1998, the Daddies had emerged as one of the most successful bands of the swing revival: after climbing to number one on Billboard's Top Heatseekers, Zoot Suit Riot became the first album of the swing revival to crack the Top 40 on the Billboard 200, peaking at number 17 and spending an ultimate total of 53 weeks on the charts. In June 1998, the album had sold 500,000 copies in the United States, going on to surpass sales of 1.4 million by August.

"Zoot Suit Riot" (1997)
Though never intended as a single, "Zoot Suit Riot" became the Daddies' breakout hit and one of the most popular songs of the swing revival.

Suddenly finding themselves in hot demand, the Daddies immediately started touring again. Spending the majority of 1998 and 1999 on the road, the band were now playing close to 300 shows a year, carrying out both headlining and supporting tours of the United States while traveling internationally as one of the headliners on the 1998 Warped Tour beside Rancid, NOFX and Bad Religion. By this time, the group's touring conditions had greatly improved, thus enticing Dan Schmid – who had originally left the band due to health concerns – to return as the Daddies' bassist at Perry's request.

Although the Daddies were experiencing commercial success under the guise of swing revivalists, having been declared the "leaders" of the movement by Rolling Stone, the band openly contested being labeled a retro act at the exclusion of their dominant ska and punk influences and modernist lyricism. While still vocal supporters of both the swing revival and its bands, the Daddies adamantly tried to disassociate themselves from the swing scene and in particular its nostalgia-based mentality: Perry explained to Spin in July 1998, "it's not our mission to be a swing band. I'm not a guy from the '40s. That's why we play ska and use heavy guitars", noting elsewhere "I can't fully take us out of the retro classification, but we harp on the fact that we're contemporary music". Thusly, the Daddies avoided touring with swing bands, selecting Latin rock group Ozomatli and ska/soul band The Pietasters as support on their first headlining U.S. tour, and opening for Argentine rock band Los Fabulosos Cadillacs on their 1998 North American tour. At one point, the Daddies attempted to arrange a tour with Primus which never materialized; said Perry, "I know there are people who come to our shows who'd like nothing more than for us to play swing 24/7 ... there are plenty of bands who want to be swing bands and swing bands only. We're trying to find the audience who'll let us write songs and just be who we are".

I figured the swing scene would be a hybrid of The Clash and The Cotton Club ... [b]ut then when other bands did swing music, they did a kind of '50s version. They kept it very clean and vanilla. Most of it has to do with nice people having manners and dressing up. That's not what we wanted. We wanted to be The Rolling Stones of swing, not The Beatles of swing.

— Steve Perry, commenting on the retro aesthetics of the swing revival, 2016

During the height of the Daddies' popularity, Perry found the band's mainstream notoriety was causing an alienating effect on his personal life, claiming it to have negatively changed his relationships with friends and even subjected him to occasional heckling from strangers who recognized him in public. He would later recall, "It's a total cliché, but [fame] doesn't make you happy. There's a lot missing. Success has given people the right to yell at me on the street, but I don't really feel like it's given me any dignity". Already feeling burnt out from the Daddies' constant touring, Perry's frustration was only exacerbated by the media's persistent dismissal of the Daddies as a retro novelty act, though he later claimed to have felt pressured to maintain the image due to audience and media expectations. When the band began to face criticism and accusations of selling out from their Northwest fanbase, the Daddies fought to further push themselves away from their mainstream typecasting: in a 1999 interview, responding to their place in the swing scene, Perry retorted "[we'll] unapologetically play ska right in the face of people who want to hear swing".

Zoot Suit Riot had sold over two million copies in the United States by the time the swing revival's mainstream popularity had declined, finally slipping off the charts in January 2000. With their touring schedule finally coming to a close, the Daddies commenced work on their next studio album.

=== Soul Caddy and mainstream decline (2000) ===
In the fall of 1999, the Daddies returned to the studio to record their fourth album, Soul Caddy. A loose concept album reflecting Perry's disillusionment over the cultural zeitgeist and his experience with fame - as he described it, a "bittersweet" record about "being alienated and hoping to connect" - Soul Caddy marked a continuation of the band's musically varied format, intended to introduce a truer perspective of the Daddies' sound and personality to both their swing-based fans and a wider audience. Drawing from the rock and pop of the 1960s and 1970s, Soul Caddy interwove swing and ska with glam rock, soul, psychedelic pop, folk and funk.

Despite allowing the Daddies creative control over its production, Mojo's response to Soul Caddy was considered tepid at best. Claiming that the new material was not like "the Cherry Poppin' Daddies people know and love", the label did little to promote neither the album nor its glam-styled single "Diamond Light Boogie", at one point releasing the latter without the band's name on it, allegedly due to hesitancy over marketing a rock single from a band primarily known for swing music. With virtually no publicity behind it, Soul Caddy was quietly released in October 2000. Met by a public largely unaware of the Daddies' eclectic background, Soul Caddy was received negatively by both fans and critics, one of the more prevalent criticisms being its lack of swing tracks. Some reviewers chastised the band for what was being seen as an abandonment of their swing "roots" in favor of a trendier sound, while a few criticized the Daddies' entire musical aesthetic — UGO's Hip Online stated bluntly, "covering five or six genres on one album is just insane". The Los Angeles Daily News placed Soul Caddy on their list of the 10 worst albums of 2000, the reviewer wondering what made a swing band "think it could get away with an album of recycled psychedelic pop".

Despite some moderate critical praise including a glowing review from AllMusic, who called the album's "impressively surprising" array of sounds "refreshing coming from a band who was assumed to be generic retro swing", Soul Caddy failed to achieve the chart success or commercial attention of its predecessor. The Daddies' accompanying national tour fared just as poorly, showing a marked decline in attendance while audiences reacted unfavorably towards the band's decreased focus on playing swing music. Speaking retrospectively in a 2002 interview, Perry recalled "we went out on tour and most people saw us as a swing band because of the success of Zoot Suit Riot...we felt this tension to be something we weren't". Facing low ticket sales and their own dissatisfaction over the tour's outcome, the Daddies brought their scheduled tour to an early close, reaching a mutual decision upon taking an indefinite hiatus in December 2000. "A lot of it was just fatigue", Perry explained, "We'd be on the road for a long time and we had no life outside of Cherry Poppin' Daddies. I think everybody was interested in doing other things". The Daddies were released from Mojo shortly thereafter, though guitarist Jason Moss would later comment that the band were kicked "to the curb" after Soul Caddy's poor commercial performance.

=== Hiatus and limited touring (2001–2006) ===
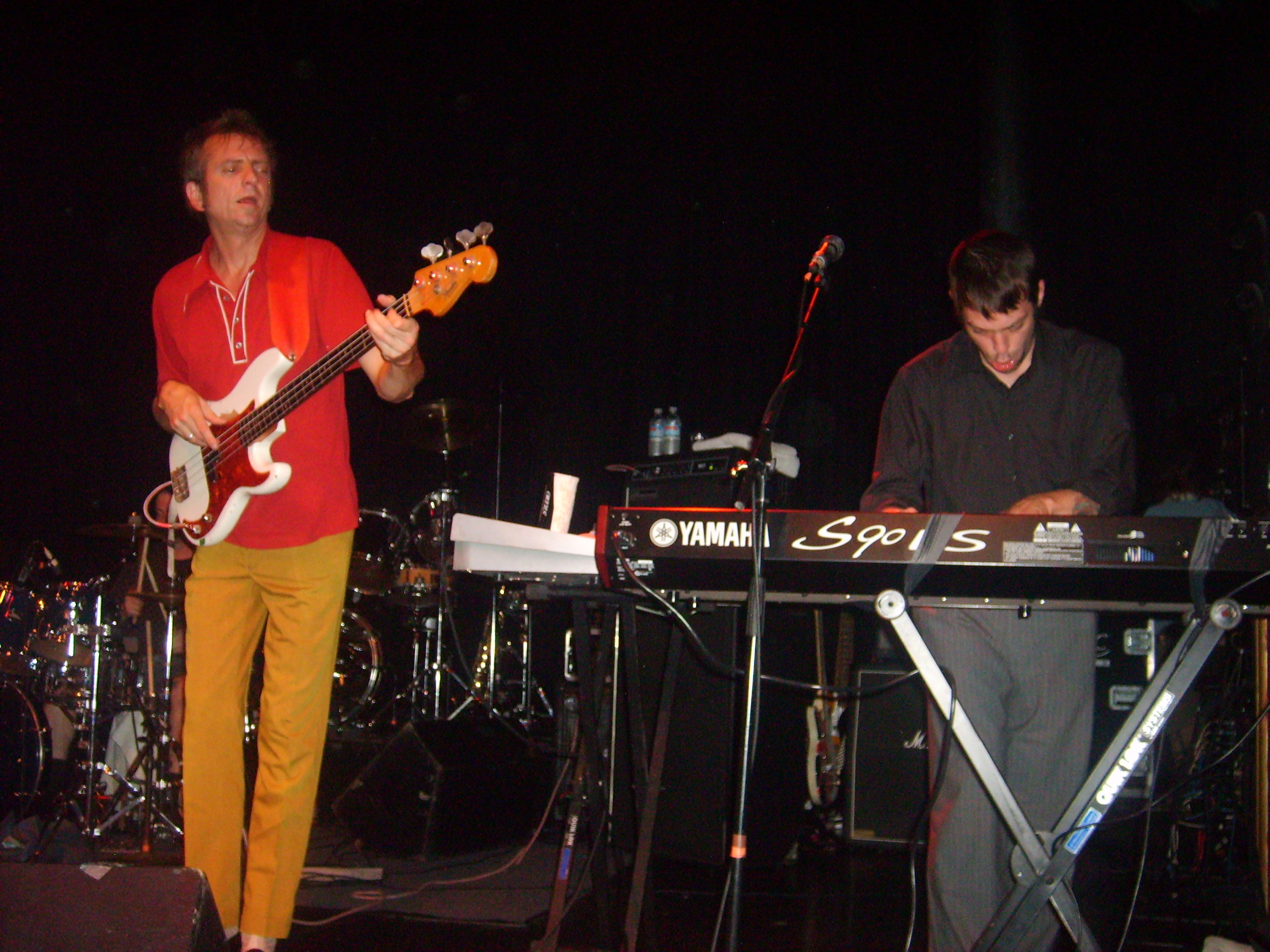
Dan Schmid and Dustin Lanker, pictured here playing with the Daddies, continued as the pop duo The Visible Men during the Daddies' hiatus.

With nearly a decade of full-time band activity come to a rest, the Daddies parted ways to pursue other musical endeavors, remaining active in various local bands. Most notably, Perry and Moss started the theatrical glam punk group White Hot Odyssey, releasing an album on Jive Records in 2004 before disbanding the following year, while Schmid and keyboardist Dustin Lanker formed the piano rock trio The Visible Men, recording two studio albums and touring extensively until their own disbandment in 2007. Around this time, Schmid also toured as bassist for Pixies frontman Black Francis' band, recording on his 2007 album Bluefinger as well as recording on Pete Yorn's Francis-produced self-titled album in 2010. Lanker later joined California ska punk band the Mad Caddies as a touring member, eventually becoming a permanent member in 2013. Drummer Tim Donahue, after a stint with The Visible Men, worked as a session musician, recording on albums for artists including TobyMac and Shawn McDonald and playing in Yngwie Malmsteen's band for his 2001 European tour.

Over the next few years, all Daddies activity was put on further hold as the members returned to their family lives and full-time jobs, while Perry chose to resume his education at the University of Oregon, graduating in 2004 with a B.S. in molecular biology. In February 2002, after over a year without playing, the Daddies ended their hiatus by headlining at The Festival at Sandpoint in Sandpoint, Idaho, which was followed by a series of sporadic appearances at various music festivals throughout the Northwest. Despite the sudden resurgence of activity, the band resolutely announced no future plans for recording new material or undertaking any extensive tours. Favoring a change of pace from their formerly intensive touring habits, the Daddies began scheduling their performances entirely around the band members' desire and personal availability, playing as few as eight to ten shows a year and limiting their appearances largely to Northwest shows or commissions for one-off "swingin' hits" concerts at various festivals and venues across the United States.

=== Susquehanna and return to independent label (2006–2009) ===
Following four years of relative inactivity as the band maintained their relaxed touring pace, Perry began writing material for a new Daddies album in early 2006, claiming to have come to the realization of a cathartic reliance on songwriting. In an April 2006 radio interview, he confirmed that the band was in preparation to record a new studio album, noting that the music would cover new territory for the Daddies, drawing heavily on tropical elements. Throughout the fall of 2006, the band carried out several small tours throughout the United States, where much of this new material was debuted.

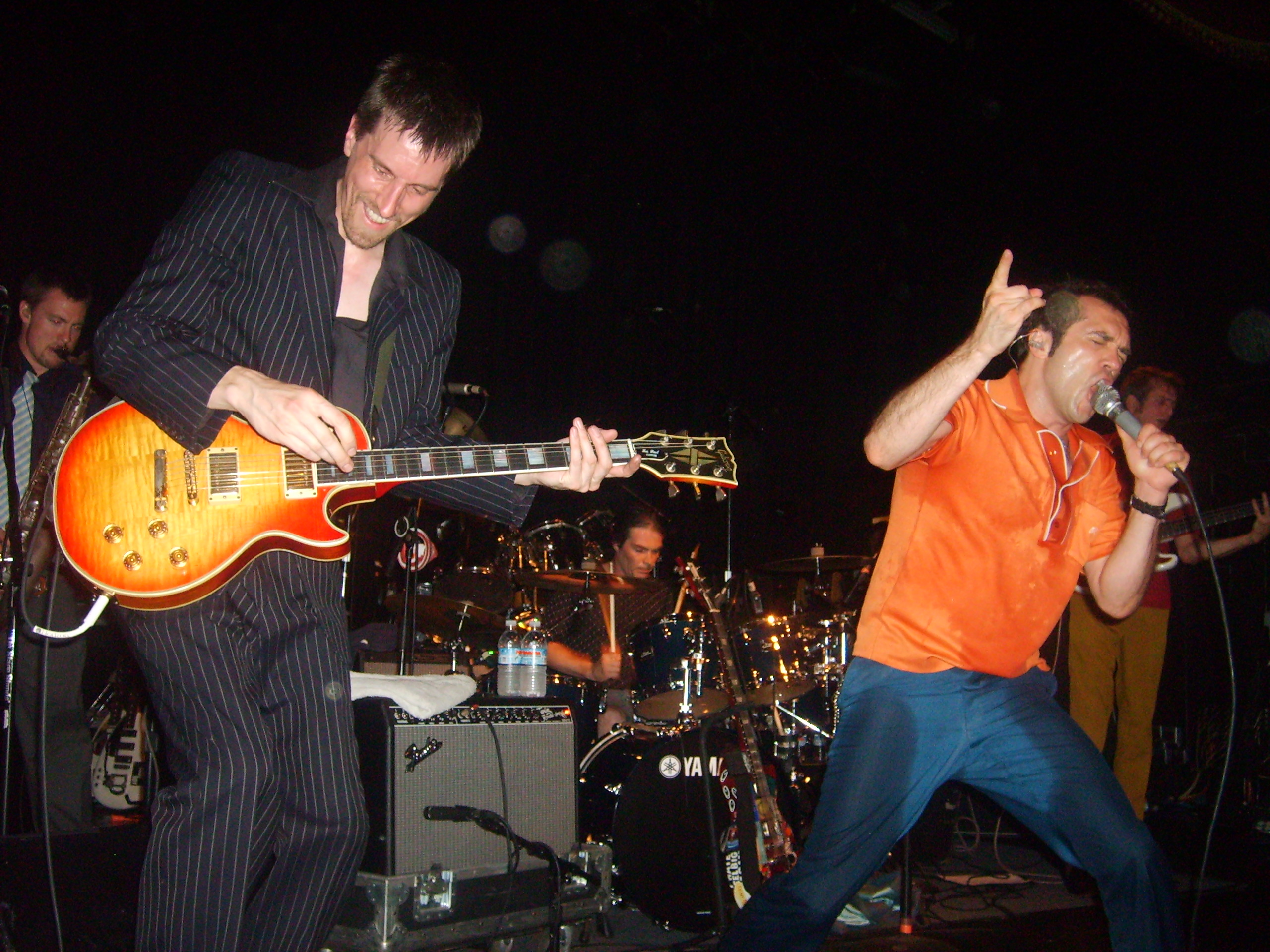
The Daddies performing in California in 2007. Guitarist Jason Moss played with the band from 1992 to 2010, serving the longest tenure of any non-original member.

Self-produced and recorded in Eugene during the summer of 2007, the Daddies' fifth album, Susquehanna, was released via digital download exclusively through the band's website in February 2008, receiving a limited CD release several months later. Taking the shape of a narrative concept album which Perry detailed as a portrait of "various relationships in decay", Susquehanna featured prominent strains of Latin and Caribbean-influenced music, incorporating flourishes of flamenco, Latin rock and reggae into the band's traditional fare of swing and ska. While its low-profile DIY release went mostly unnoticed by the mainstream media, response from internet-based publications ranged from mixed to positive, with reviewers once again polarized over the album's eclectic blend of genres. The Daddies embarked on another full-length tour in support of Susquehanna in mid-2008, followed by a headline tour of Europe, their first visit to the continent since 1998.

In July 2009, the Daddies announced having signed to independent label Rock Ridge Music for the release and national distribution of two albums, a re-issue of Susquehanna and Skaboy JFK: The Skankin' Hits of the Cherry Poppin' Daddies, a compilation of the band's ska material culled from their first five albums. Perry explained that fans had been suggesting the concept of a ska collection for years, and that such an album might help show a different side of the Daddies than the "swing band" persona they're generally recognized for. Skaboy JFK was released in September 2009 to a largely positive critical reception, followed by further touring into 2010, taking the Daddies back across Europe and the United States, as well as appearing alongside Fishbone and The Black Seeds at the 11th Victoria Ska Fest in British Columbia, where the band played the first all-ska set of their career.

=== White Teeth, Black Thoughts (2010–2013) ===
Shortly after the release of Skaboy JFK, Perry already began announcing plans for the Daddies' next studio album, revealing the band would be returning to swing music for their first all-swing album since Zoot Suit Riot. Initial production on the album, titled White Teeth, Black Thoughts, began in March 2011, though lasted infrequently throughout the year as the Daddies continued to carry out several more successful international tours, including two separate sold-out tours of Australia in 2011 and 2012. During this time, the band experienced major changes within their touring lineup after longtime keyboardist Dustin Lanker departed the group in 2012, prompting the Daddies to decide to continue touring without a live keyboardist. Several months later, trombonist Joe Freuen was added to the band, marking the first time the Daddies had ever included a full-time trombone player in their official lineup.

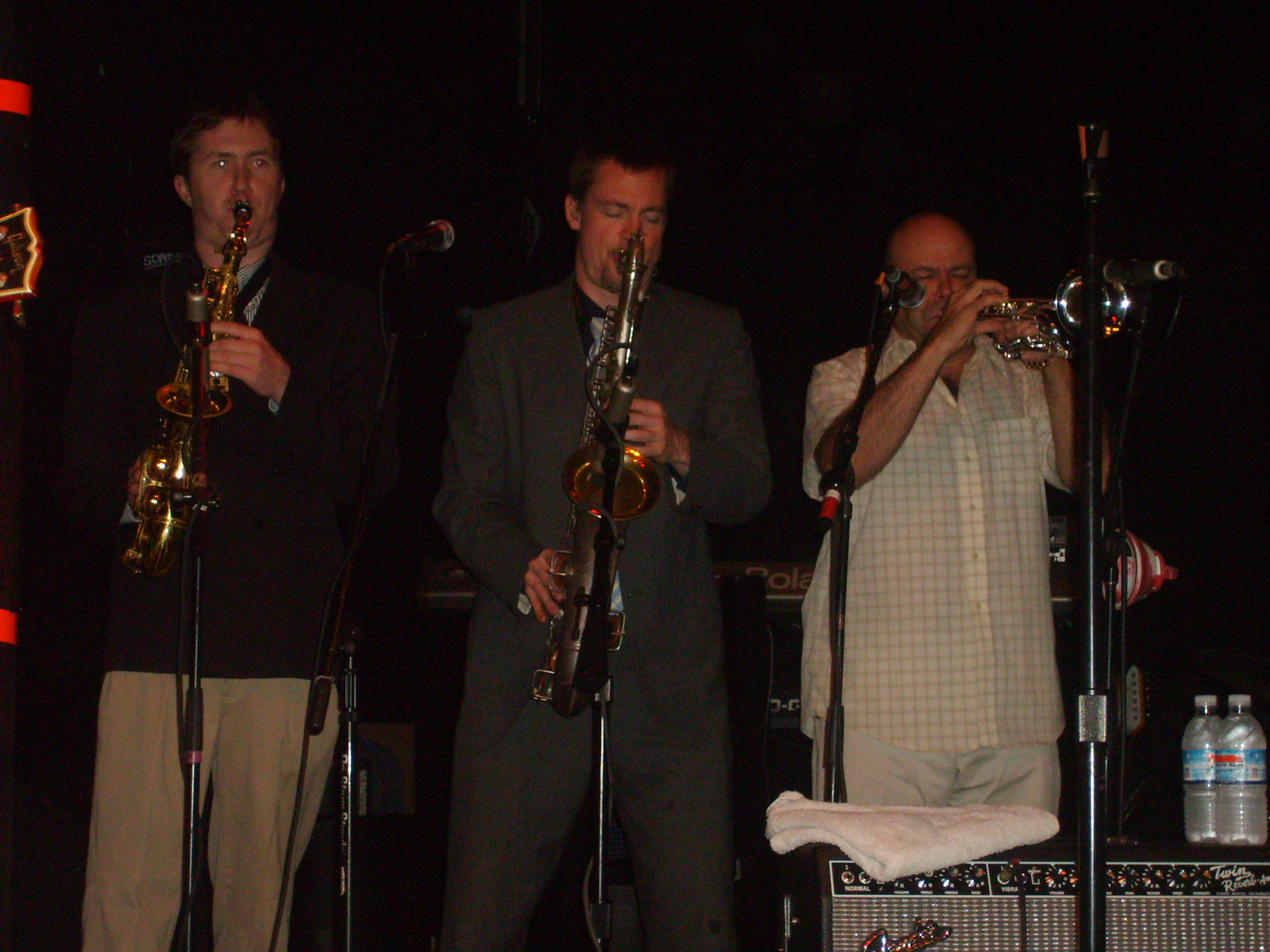
The Daddies' horn section, traditionally a trio of trumpet and alto and tenor saxophones, became a quartet with the addition of trombonist Joe Freuen in 2012.

In mid-2012, Perry finally elaborated on the production status of the new album, revealing that the band had written enough material to release White Teeth, Black Thoughts as a double album, consisting of the main all-swing album and a bonus disc of "Americana"-influenced rock songs in styles including rockabilly, country, bluegrass and western swing, the latter disc featuring guest appearances from accordionist Buckwheat Zydeco on a zydeco song and former Captain Beefheart guitarist Zoot Horn Rollo on a psychobilly track. On June 20, 2012, the Daddies launched a PledgeMusic campaign to help finance the final stages of the album's production, successfully reaching its target on August 14 and continuing to collect pledges into the following year, ultimately raising 133% of its goal.

Preceded by the release of two singles and music videos for the songs "I Love American Music" and "The Babooch", White Teeth, Black Thoughts was released independently on Space Age Bachelor Pad Records on July 16, 2013. Following the low-key DIY release and promotion of Susquehanna and Skaboy JFK, the Daddies worked to heavily publicize White Teeth, Black Thoughts, receiving coverage by major news outlets including Billboard and USA Today, while the band later appeared on the Fox-owned KTTV program Good Day L.A. to perform "I Love American Music", their first major television appearance since the 1990s. Despite not experiencing any chart success, the album received generally positive critical reviews, and the Daddies carried out a brief fifteen-city tour of the United States during the summer.

In January 2014, it was announced that the Eugene Ballet had collaborated with the Daddies for production entitled Zoot Suit Riot, a dance show set to the music of and featuring live accompaniment from the band, featuring choreographed dance routines set to thirteen of the Daddies' songs, ranging from their biggest swing hits to their lesser-known rock, pop and psychedelic songs. Zoot Suit Riot played at Eugene's Hult Center for the Performing Arts on April 12 and 13, 2014.

=== Cover albums and Zoot Suit Riot: 20th Anniversary Edition (2014–2018) ===
During the initial writing and recording period of White Teeth, Black Thoughts, the Daddies began playing select shows billed as "The Cherry Poppin' Daddies Salute the Music of the Rat Pack", playing an equal mix of the band's own swing songs as well as covers of songs popularized by the "Rat Pack" of Frank Sinatra, Dean Martin and Sammy Davis, Jr. In a July 2013 interview with Billboard magazine, Perry revealed that the band had concurrently recorded a tribute album featuring these songs and would be releasing it after touring behind White Teeth, Black Thoughts. Please Return the Evening — the Cherry Poppin' Daddies Salute the Music of the Rat Pack! was released on July 29, 2014, promoted by music videos for the album's covers of the Sinatra staples "Come Fly with Me" and "Fly Me to the Moon".

The following December, Perry expressed plans on the Daddies' official Facebook page to further explore the band's swing and jazz influences with another cover album, this time centered on the hot jazz of the Cotton Club era of the 1920s and 1930s. Production on what would eventually be entitled The Boop-A-Doo began in Spring 2015 in Eugene, utilizing vintage recording techniques as well as the use of pre-1940s instruments to achieve an authentic jazz-era sound. The Boop-A-Doo was released on January 22, 2016, promoted by a music video for the 1930 Eubie Blake/Andy Razaf song "That Lindy Hop", directed by Perry.

Initially, the Daddies announced that Please Return the Evening and The Boop-A-Doo would comprise two parts of a planned trilogy of cover albums designed to showcase the band's swing and jazz influences. Although Perry revealed in a November 2016 interview that the Daddies' third volume of cover songs would focus on either western swing or a Babs Gonzales/"beatnik"-style bebop, a third album did not come to fruition.

During this period, Perry was also occupied with the task of remixing and remastering the Daddies' Zoot Suit Riot compilation, having re-obtained the rights from Jive Records in 2014. Speaking on the project, he lamented that production of Zoot Suit Riot had been rushed and that only first takes had been used, noting that there could have been "2 or 3 more" takes of the songs "if we had known the future back in 1996", noting "after 25 years [of the band], I would like to make the record sound a little better". Zoot Suit Riot: The 20th Anniversary Edition was released on CD and vinyl on January 13, 2017, featuring five bonus live tracks recorded during the band's 1998 tours. In promotion of the album's re-release, the Daddies played select dates throughout the country, performing the album in its entirety.

=== Bigger Life (2019–2021) ===
While the Daddies dedicated most of the 2010s to playing and recording swing and jazz music, Perry first revealed in a 2014 interview with The Huffington Post that he had started writing new non-swing songs for the next original Daddies album, describing his ambitions of making a "psychobilly/Zappa/American Idiot/R. Crumb type record that paints a picture of the American socio political scene", emphasizing his desire to experiment with rockabilly and roots rock. Over the next four years, Perry gave sporadic updates on Twitter and in interviews on the development of this new album of originals, describing it in 2016 as "a little like Ferociously Stoned 2", featuring a primary emphasis on rock and funk, and then later in 2017 as "swing-ska-rockabilly-psychobilly". Production on the album began in late 2017, and on May 8, 2018, Perry announced on Twitter that the mixing process had begun on the finished product, now titled Bigger Life.

On March 12, 2019, the Daddies premiered the first single and music video from Bigger Life on their YouTube channel, a ska punk song entitled "Gym Rat", later followed by two additional singles and music videos for the songs "Diesel PunX", a rockabilly-styled song influenced by the science fiction sub-genre of dieselpunk, and the Celtic punk/folk punk-influenced "Yankee Pride". Bigger Life was released on CD and vinyl on June 14, which was celebrated with a show at Eugene's W.O.W. Hall the same day, where the Daddies debuted a new stage show focusing exclusively on the band's repertoire of ska and ska-punk songs, a set they continued to perform at select shows and festivals, including the 2019 Victoria Ska Fest. The Daddies had been scheduled to perform as part of the Supernova International Ska Festival located in Virginia in June 2020, though the festival was ultimately canceled due to the COVID-19 pandemic.

On January 31, 2020, the Daddies released the standalone single "Faux Nice, Mock Fancy", a glam rock-styled song recorded during the Bigger Life sessions. In a Facebook post announcing the single, Perry detailed that he planned to release various unreleased songs as singles throughout the year as he started work on new material. This started with the single and video release of "Platform Shoes", another glam rock-styled song from the deluxe edition of White Teeth, Black Thoughts, in mid-March and a cover of Canadian rock band The Kings' 1980 hit "Switchin' to Glide" in mid-May.

=== At the Pink Rat, Roma! Roma! and Daughters of Montezuma (2022-present) ===
In an October 2022 interview, Perry revealed that he had spent much of the pandemic writing three albums worth of original material, including an all-swing album, a ska-pop-funk album and a psychobilly album.

On July 13, 2023, the Daddies premiered "Lowdown Appreciator", the first digital single from an upcoming untitled swing album. On November 30, the band premiered another new single, "Kings of Swing", which was accompanied by the unveiling of the new album's title - At the Pink Rat, its album art and a projected release date of July 26, 2024. The album's release date was preceded by the release of nine more singles from the album which covered multiple genres of swing, big band, Dixieland and ragtime. Perry wrote that the album was conceptually conceived as almost a type of jukebox musical he had in his head "for many years" which he likened to "Saturday Night Fever meets Swing Kids", tracing "that weird connection between the Greatest Generation and Gen X that brought about the swing explosion of the 90’s".

Beginning in May of the following year, the Daddies steadily released a series of digital singles covering multiple styles of ska, Northern Soul and Mod, culminating in the release of their thirteenth studio album Roma! Roma! on January 23, 2026.

Perry's wife Yvette passed away from stage IV colorectal cancer in January 2026. On April 9, 2026, the Daddies released "Daughters of Montezuma", the first single from an album of the same title, which Perry described was a tribute to both his wife and her recently deceased father, with much of the material having been written and recorded in the final months of their lives. Perry described the album as "an overt psychedelic record": "[i]ts what happens when you drop a Mento of impending catastrophic loss, a foreknowledge of imminent annihilation of the self into the liter Pepsi bottle of 'pop rock' [...] This record documents my reflection about them, and their culture and also my own ghosts of history with a heart full of gratitude and fear as their health spiraled downhill". In May, the Daddies released the rock song "Sugar Boy" as a single, followed by the rap rock song "Wood Wizard" in August. Both singles were accompanied by music videos, marking the Daddies' first live-action music videos since 2020. Daughters of Montezuma was released on vinyl and digital streaming on November 6, 2026.

== Musical style and lyricism ==
The Daddies are generally classified as a swing and/or ska band by the media, and their music is largely composed of various interpretations of both genres, ranging from traditional jazz and big band-influenced forms to modernized rock and punk fusions. During their commercial breakthrough in the 1990s, critics conceived terms such as "punk swing", "power swing" and "big band punk rock" to describe the Daddies' unique approach to these fusions, mixing "the propulsion of swing beats and rabbit-punch bursts of brass with grimy rebel-rock guitars to give the jumpin' jive sound a much-needed facelift". The Pacific Northwest Inlander wrote of this style in 1994, "atop the swing of the band's jazz you can hear strains of Parliament-Funkadelic, crumbs of barrelhouse rhythm and blues, snippets of ska, and huge whiffs of in-your-face punk rock", likening the Daddies to "Cab Calloway-meets-Johnny Rotten, or the Duke Ellington Orchestra pumped up on steroids and caffeine".

Rapid City Muscle Car (1994)
Samples of five songs from Rapid City Muscle Car, illustrating the eclectic mix of genres typical of most Daddies albums, here showcasing ska punk, funk rock, country, hard rock and big band swing.

The Daddies themselves used to facetiously classify their music as "swing-core", exemplified by the fast tempos and frequent use of guitar distortion in their swing material, as well as "third wave swing", owing to their prominent ska influence. In recent years, however, Perry has dismissed attempts to apply labels to the Daddies' music, often casually describing them in vaguer terms as "a rock band with horns" or "a dance band that uses jazz a bit". Perry has compared the Daddies' style of musical eclecticism with that of Fishbone, Mink DeVille and Oingo Boingo, while also citing major influence from The Specials and Roxy Music, as well as from Fletcher Henderson, Jimmie Lunceford and Duke Ellington on his composing and arrangements.

Alongside the constants of swing, ska, and on earlier recordings, funk, most of the Daddies' studio albums feature a collective assortment of varied and often diametrically opposed genres of music. Some of the musical styles the band has experimented with include blues, country, disco, Dixieland, flamenco, folk, glam rock, hardcore punk, jump blues, lounge, psychedelic pop, rhythm and blues, reggae, rockabilly, soca, soul, western swing and zydeco. As opposed to playing fusions, the Daddies perform each genre separately, contrasting one style against another so that the album's musical texture continually changes. Perry has explained that the group's "detournement" of using vastly different genres is both a means for band experimentation and evolution beyond their typically swing and ska-oriented live shows, as well as an artistic choice, lending each song a distinctive musical personality and using certain genres to effectively fit – or ironically contradict – the tone of the lyrics.

=== Lyrical ===
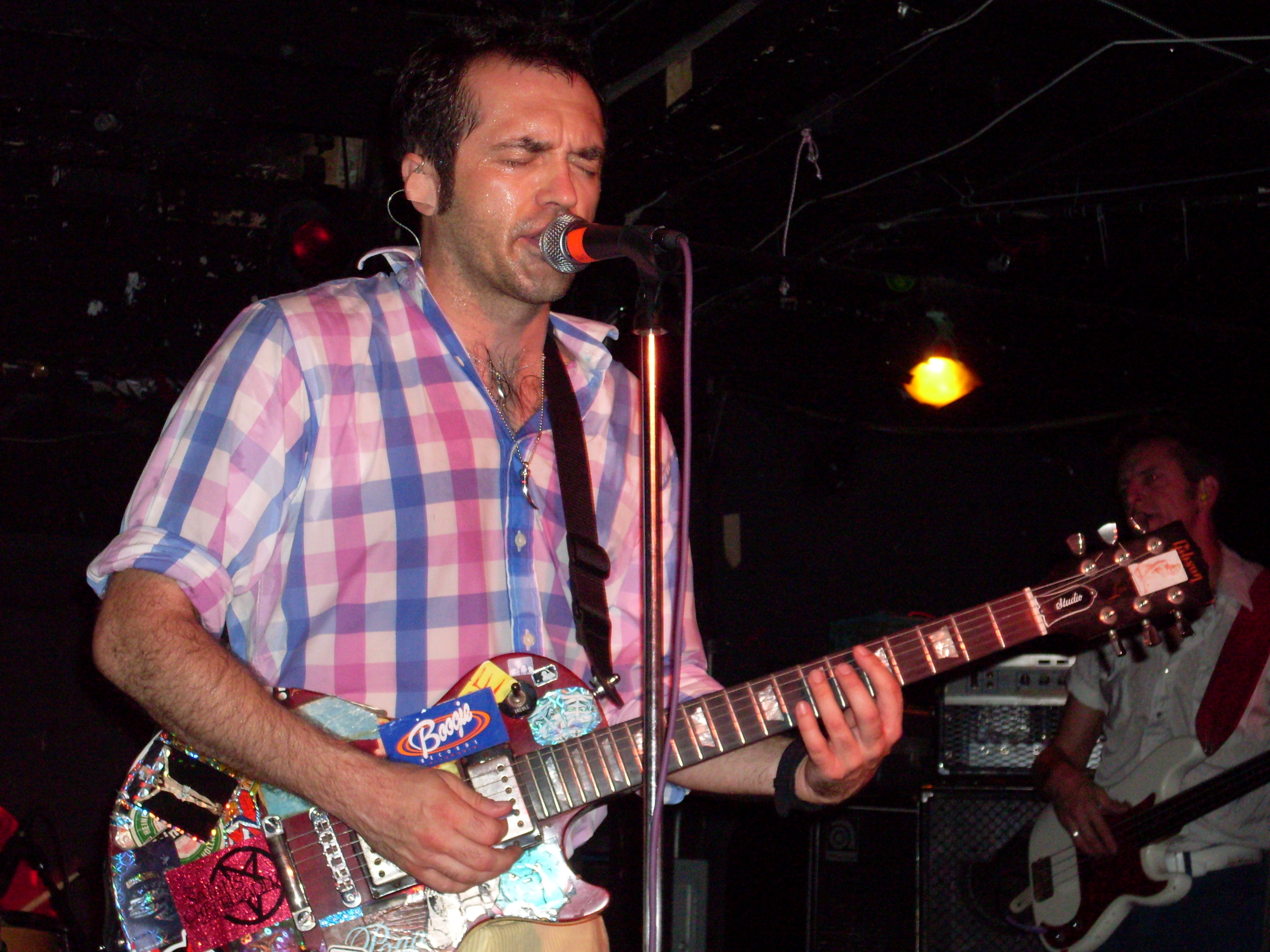
As sole composer and lyricist, Steve Perry is credited as the creative force behind the Daddies.

Steve Perry is the Daddies' sole lyricist, and writes the majority of his songs in a fictional narrative format he credits as being influenced by Randy Newman, Ray Davies and Jarvis Cocker, often told about or through the unreliable perspective of downtrodden characters struggling against adversity. Recurring themes in the Daddies' lyrics include sex, death, working class life, class consciousness, alcoholism, family dysfunction, loneliness and social alienation, frequently utilizing humor and satire. Perry often incorporates commentary on contemporary American politics into his music, such as addressing issues relating to the 2008 financial crisis on White Teeth, Black Thoughts (2013) and exploring themes of race and class during the first presidency of Donald Trump on Bigger Life (2019). The Register-Guard has described Perry's lyrics as "ribald [and] often despairing", "[probing] the underbelly of society, stabbing at oppressors such as ... the pressure to conform", while The New York Times has lauded them as "vivid poetry" containing "an inventiveness missing from most of the other swing bands' lyrics".

The Daddies have often been criticized for their seeming juxtaposition of lurid subject matter and profanity with jazz and swing music, though Perry has defended the band's predilection towards "darker" lyricism and visuals, calling to attention his interest in the era's film noir and avant-garde artistic movements. A prominent example of this includes the two music videos for the Daddies' hit single "Zoot Suit Riot", which – in addition to being written about the 1943 race riots – both featured pervasive surrealist imagery inspired by the films of Luis Buñuel, specifically his 1929 short Un Chien Andalou. "We wanted to be darker, weirder and stranger", Perry stated in a 2012 interview, "and unfortunately, with other [swing] bands it was 'Back then everyone dressed nice and was nice'. That's not true. You don't know anything about that era at all".

Most of the Daddies' studio albums are written to varying extents as concept albums, featuring either recurring lyrical themes or an abstract narrative. According to Perry, this lyrical interconnectedness is intended as means of providing an album with threads of thematic stability against wildly varying musical styles.

== Reception, criticism and influence ==
In their native Oregon, the Daddies have been called "a Northwest institution", having been inducted into the Oregon Music Hall of Fame in 2009. The Register-Guard has credited the band with shaping Eugene's alternative musical culture in the 1990s, while Eugene Weekly added likewise, "when some people think of the Northwest music scene, they think of grunge. If you're a Eugenean, however, you might think of swing, thanks to [the] Cherry Poppin' Daddies". Seattle's The Rocket commented on the band's influence in 1997, stating "[t]he Daddies were busting out the swing before the Squirrel Nut Zippers, stirring cocktails before Combustible Edison and skating the ska before Sublime ... the band shakes out an incredible variety of sounds with peerless verve and polish."

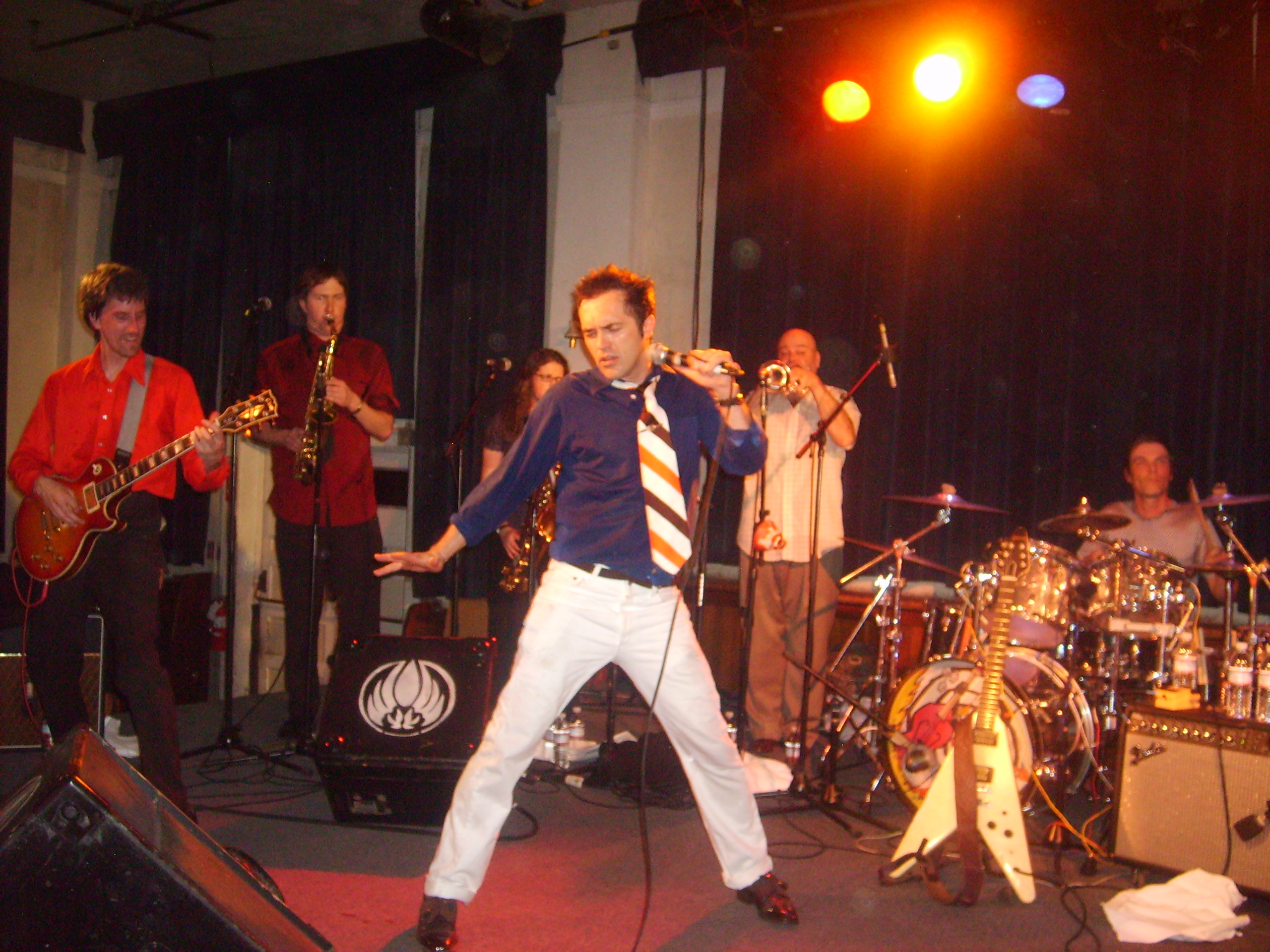
The Daddies performing at Eugene's W.O.W. Hall in 2008. The Register-Guard has described the historic music venue as "the house that the Daddies built".

Together with the controversies surrounding the early years of their career, the band have also attracted a fair amount of professional criticism in their home state. The Portland Mercury have been frequent detractors of the Daddies, deriding them as "at best, an edgeless recycle of a rather particular musical fashion movement; at worst, a self-conscious parody of the genre they purport to love", while the Willamette Week, in an article detailing the band's polarizing reception, described the negative consensus of the Daddies as "an annoying white-boy funk rock band who, seeing the opportunity, milked the swing revival for all it was worth". Jazz critic and author Scott Yanow vociferously criticized the band as the choice "whipping boy for the Retro Swing movement" in his 2000 book Swing!, writing them off as "a punk rock band who has chosen to masquerade as Swing, at least until a better fad comes along", spotlighting the Daddies' "mediocre" rhythm section and profane lyricism as a case for making them "a band to avoid".

The Daddies are more widely recognized, however, as one of the first bands to revive swing music in the musical mainstream, helping spearhead the swing revival of the late 1990s which paved the way for the larger successes of Big Bad Voodoo Daddy and the Brian Setzer Orchestra. Although the Daddies have been cited as an influence on ska punk band the Mad Caddies, SF Weekly once claimed the group has "never gotten the accolades it deserves" for their eclectic funk-ska repertoire. The Phoenix New Times expressed similar sentiments, listing the "woefully unsung" Daddies as among the bands that defined the Northwest's "alternative to alternative", "[delivering] rock with more complexity than three-chord guitar riffs and social critique without heavy-handed cynicism". In a 2008 retrospective feature posted on RollingStone.com's The Capri Lounge, a blog run by the editors of Rolling Stone magazine, the Daddies were declared as "one of the most misunderstood bands of the nineties".

=== Band name ===
[The band name] definitely doesn't mean what people think if they giggle when they hear it. We had a show and needed a name. Being punk, we wanted an up-yours name like Butthole Surfers. It came from the lyrics in a race record. Now it's our cross to bear and explain in every interview. I assure you we don't cruise high schools for dates.

— Steve Perry, commenting on the Daddies' name in 1998, Billboard

The Daddies have also retained a more ignominious recognition for their off-color band name which has persisted beyond the initial controversies which pegged the band's early years. The Daddies frequently appear on lists of the worst band names of all time, including those by Pitchfork, the Seattle Post-Intelligencer, the Toronto Sun, and VH1, the last of which called it "quite possibly the most offensive band name ever, made all the more ridiculous by the fact that these outwardly bragging virgin-sexers had a completely innocuous mainstream hit song". A 2009 issue of Blender magazine placed the Daddies in third place in a bracket chart of the worst band names, while in 2013, Rolling Stone included the Daddies on their list of "The Thirteen Dumbest Band Names in Rock History", noting that the incestuous interpretation of the name is "the last thing anyone wants to visualize while listening to music".

Steve Perry has expressed ambivalence about the name's controversy, conceding it is "probably the most heinous name in the history of rock" though also trying to contextualize it within the band's roots in the 1980s Northwest punk rock scene: in a 2020 interview, he explained "it's a lot harder to understand the name now that the counter-cultural mentality has faded, but in that time, the idea was you wanted to choose a band name that would attract other punk rock kids and keep others at bay". In a 2000 interview, he further detailed the contrast between the Daddies' name and their unexpected breakthrough into the wider cultural mainstream, saying "Pop culture is trying to offend no one. We didn't come out of that; we came from the loyal opposition. We came out of the punk movement. How can I deny that? I started this band a long time ago, and we just used [the name]. We didn't know that in 10 years we'd turn into some sort of happy, peppy, feel-good things."

Although Perry has occasionally voiced regret over not having changed the Daddies' name early in their career, he has more recently come to embrace the controversy around the name as his "Holden Caulfield red hunting hat - a badge of honor", dismissing critics who choose to demonize the name based on literal interpretation than the jazz-era jive slang it drew from as "outrage addicts".

== Band members ==
=== Current members ===
- Steve Perry (MC Large Drink) – lead vocals, rhythm guitar (1989–present)
- Dan Schmid (Dang Oulette) – bass (1989–1996, 1998–present)
- Dana Heitman – trumpet (1989–present)
- Willie Matheis – tenor saxophone, bari saxophone (2010–present)
- Jason Moss– lead guitar, backing vocals (1992-2010, 2024–present)
- Nik Barber – drums (2022–present)
- Kyle Moliter -trombone (2024-present)

=== Former members ===
- Tim Arnold – drums (1989–1990)
- James Gossard – lead guitar (1989–1990)
- John Fohl – lead guitar (1990–1992)
- James Phillips – tenor saxophone (1989–1992, 1996; died 2011)
- Brooks Brown – alto saxophone (1989–1994)
- Adrian P. Baxter – tenor saxophone (1993–1996)
- Adam Glogauer – drums (1996)
- Sean Oldham – drums (1996)
- Jason Palmer – drums (1996; 2009 studio recordings)
- Brian West – drums (1990–1996; died 2018)
- Chris Azorr – keyboards (1990–1997)
- Rex Trimm – alto saxophone (1996–1997)
- Hans Wagner – drums (1996–1997)
- Naiya Cominos – bass (1995–1996)
- Darren Cassidy – bass (1996–1998)
- Johnny Goetchius – keyboards (1998–2000)
- Ian Early – alto saxophone (1997–2006)
- Tim Donahue – drums (1997–2008)
- Sean Flannery – tenor saxophone (1996–2008)
- Jesse Cloninger – tenor saxophone (2008–2010)
- Jason Moss – guitar (1992–2010; 2024–present)
- Dustin Lanker – keyboards, backing vocals (1997–1998, 2000–2012)
- Kevin Congleton – drums (2008–2013)
- Joe Manis – alto and baritone saxophones (2006–2013)
- William Seiji Marsh – lead guitar, backing vocals (2010–2014)
- Chris Ward – lead guitar, banjo, backing vocals (2014–2024)
- Paul Owen – drums (2013–2017)
- Andy Page – alto saxophone, clarinet (2013–2019)
- Joe Freuen – trombone (2012–2019)
- Oscar Watson III – drums
- Josh Hettwer – alto saxophone (2016–2023)
- Matt Hettwer – trombone, keyboards (2019–2023)

== Discography ==
Studio albums

- Ferociously Stoned (1990)
- Rapid City Muscle Car (1994)
- Kids on the Street (1996)
- Soul Caddy (2000)
- Susquehanna (2008)
- White Teeth, Black Thoughts (2013)
- Please Return the Evening (2014)
- The Boop-A-Doo (2016)
- Bigger Life (2019)
- At the Pink Rat (2024)
- Roma! Roma! (2026)
- Daughters of Montezuma (2026)

Compilations

- Zoot Suit Riot: The Swingin' Hits of the Cherry Poppin' Daddies (1997)
- Skaboy JFK: The Skankin' Hits of the Cherry Poppin' Daddies (2009)
