= Jason Moss (musician) =

American musician (born 1969)

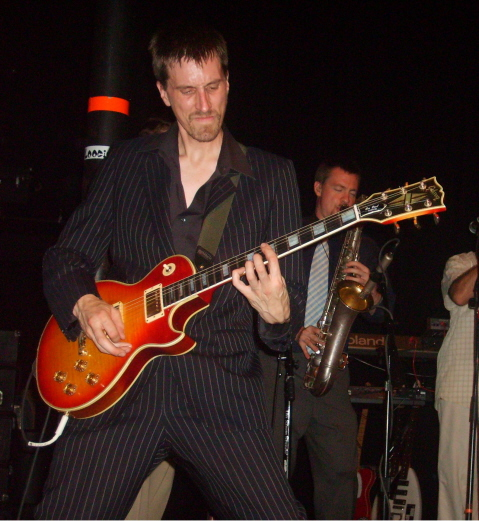
- Jason Moss playing with the Cherry Poppin' Daddies in 2007.

Background information
- Born: April 19, 1969 (age 57); Lawrence, Kansas
- Genres: Rock, swing, ska, hard rock
- Occupation: Musician
- Instrument: Lead guitar
- Years active: 1992–present

Jason David Moss (born April 19, 1969) is an American musician, known for his work as the lead guitarist for the ska-swing band the Cherry Poppin' Daddies, of which he was a member from 1992 to 2010, and 2024 to the present.

== Biography ==
=== Early life ===
Born in Lawrence, Kansas, Moss grew up in Oregon following his family's relocation to Eugene in 1976. Influenced by hard rock and guitarists such as Jimmy Page and Ace Frehley, Moss taught himself guitar at age 14, and spent most of his early music career playing in various Eugene cover bands and a group called The Impostors. After his graduation from South Eugene High School in 1986, he left to study journalism at Western Washington University.

=== Career ===
Following the departure of Cherry Poppin' Daddies guitarist John Fohl in 1992, the band placed an open ad seeking a replacement member. Already a fan of the regionally popular group, Moss responded and, after being hired on the spot by Daddies frontman Steve Perry, dropped out of school to tour with the group full-time. Moss played lead guitar on all of the Daddies' recordings from 1994's Rapid City Muscle Car to 2009's Skaboy JFK before leaving the band in March 2010 to resume his education. He has since performed with the band on few occasions, substituting for then-guitarist William Seiji Marsh for two concerts in Washington in February 2012, and playing alongside Marsh for Zoot Suit Riot, a live music and dance show created by the Eugene Ballet Company featuring the music of the Daddies, in April 2014.

Throughout his tenure with the Daddies, Moss alternated between a Gibson Les Paul, an Epiphone Broadway hollowbody and a Hamer Artist Mahogany, and most recently used Vox amplifiers.

Outside of the Daddies, Moss also played and recorded with the Eugene-based glam punk band White Hot Odyssey alongside Steve Perry and the hip hop–jazz group Runaway Slave. In 2011, he relocated to the Bay Area, where he currently works as a guitar instructor and plays with the Los Altos classic and modern rock cover band The Megatones.

== Discography ==
=== Cherry Poppin' Daddies ===
See: Cherry Poppin' Daddies discography for complete list of recordings

- Rapid City Muscle Car (1994) – lead guitar
- Kids on the Street (1996) – lead guitar
- Zoot Suit Riot (1997) – lead guitar (tracks 1, 3–7, 9, 12)
- Soul Caddy (2000) – guitar
- Susquehanna (2008) – guitar
- Skaboy JFK (2009) – guitar
- Daughters of Montezuma (2026) - guitar

=== White Hot Odyssey ===
- White Hot Odyssey (2004) – guitar
