= Dan Schmid =

American musician

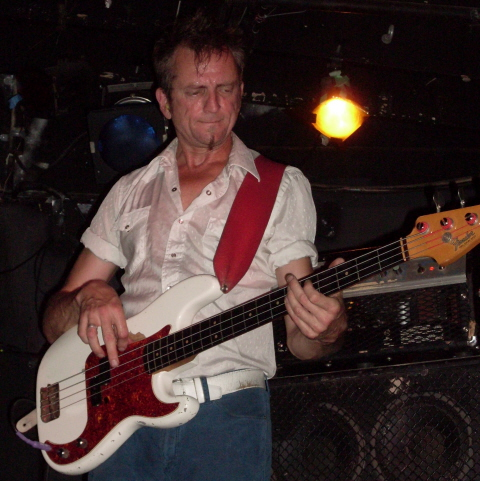
- Dan Schmid playing with the Cherry Poppin' Daddies in 2009

Background information
- Also known as: "The Skinny Atlas"; Dang Oulette
- Born: Portland, Oregon
- Genres: Rock, alternative rock, swing, ska, punk rock
- Occupation: Musician
- Instruments: Bass guitar, upright bass
- Years active: 1989 – present
- Member of: Cherry Poppin' Daddies; The Visible Men

Daniel Joseph Schmid is an American musician, known for his work as the bassist and co-founder of the ska-swing band the Cherry Poppin' Daddies. Schmid was also part of the rock duo the Visible Men, and has worked with alternative rock musicians such as Black Francis and Pete Yorn.

== Career ==
Schmid was majoring in architecture at the University of Oregon in the early 1980s when he befriended fellow student Steve Perry. Bonding over a mutual love of punk rock, the pair eventually decided to drop out of college together to pursue their musical ambitions, playing together in the punk trio the Jazz Greats and the garage rock group Saint Huck before forming what would eventually become the Cherry Poppin' Daddies in late 1988. Schmid toured and recorded with the Daddies for nearly a decade before leaving the band in 1996, following the birth of his first child and finding the conditions of the band's hectic touring schedule beginning to take a toll on his health (Schmid is asthmatic and has many food allergies). In Schmid's absence, with Darren Cassidy assuming bass guitar duties, the Daddies recorded Zoot Suit Riot, the album which eventually led to the band's commercial breakthrough. In mid-1998, at the height of the Daddies' mainstream popularity, the band's touring conditions had improved enough for Schmid to return to the line-up at Perry's insistence, where he remains to this day.

In 1999, Schmid and Daddies keyboardist Dustin Lanker, both wanting to write music more experimental than what they were doing with the Daddies, formed the rock trio the Visible Men as a side project, playing with a rotating line-up of drummers. Following the Daddies' hiatus in late 2000, Schmid and Lanker turned their attention back towards the Visible Men, recording two independent albums and touring extensively throughout the western half of the United States in the mid-2000s before going on hiatus themselves in 2007. Schmid and Lanker also briefly played together in the Eugene tango band Mood Area 52.

In 2007, Schmid was selected to play in former Pixies singer and then Eugene resident Black Francis' backing band, recording bass guitar on his critically acclaimed album Bluefinger and playing on his international tour supporting the album. Since 2010, Schmid has also been a member of the Eugene punk/garage rock band the Golden Motors.

Schmid currently lives in Eugene with his wife Rachel and their children Violet and Mikah. Outside of his musical career, Schmid made a living as a bartender, as the work schedule proved flexible enough to accommodate his frequent touring with the Daddies. He was a veteran of Eugene's High Street Brewery & Café until 2012, when he joined Plank Town Brewing Company in neighboring Springfield, where he acts as floor manager.

== Discography ==
=== Cherry Poppin' Daddies ===
See: Cherry Poppin' Daddies discography for complete recordings

- Ferociously Stoned (1990) - bass
- Rapid City Muscle Car (1994) - bass (as Dang Oulette)
- Kids on the Street (1996) - bass
- Soul Caddy (2000) - bass
- Susquehanna (2007) - bass
- Skaboy JFK (2009) - bass
- White Teeth, Black Thoughts (2013) - bass
- Please Return the Evening (2014) - bass
- The Boop-A-Doo (2016) - bass
- Bigger Life (2019) - bass
- At the Pink Rat (2024) - bass
- Roma! Roma! (2026) - bass
- Daughters of Montezuma (2026) - bass

=== The Visible Men ===
- In Socks Mode (2002) - Bass
- Love:30 (2005) - Bass, guitar

=== Miscellaneous ===
- Black Francis - Bluefinger (2007) - Bass
- Pete Yorn - Pete Yorn (2010) - Bass
- The Golden Motors - The Golden Motors (2012) - Bass
- Black Francis - Live in Nijmegen (2012) - Bass (recorded in February 2008)
