= Rapid City Muscle Car =

Studio album by Cherry Poppin' Daddies
- Released: December 12, 1994
- Recorded: 1994
- Studio: Gung Ho Studios, Eugene, OR; Space Age Bachelor Pad Studio; Dogfish Studios, Newberg, OR
- Genre: Various
- Length: 53:53
- Label: Space Age Bachelor Pad
- Producer: Cherry Poppin' Daddies

Cherry Poppin' Daddies chronology
Ferociously Stoned (1990)	Rapid City Muscle Car (1994)	Kids on the Street (1996)

Alternative cover

Professional ratings
Review scores
Source	Rating
Allmusic	4/5 stars

Rapid City Muscle Car is the second studio album by American band the Cherry Poppin' Daddies, released in 1994 on Space Age Bachelor Pad Records.

== Overview ==
Rapid City Muscle Car was structured around the Daddies' desire to create a stylistic concept album in which each track was composed as the total musical opposite of the last - "[whipping] the listener around as if he/she was...experiencing stylistic G-forces" - but remaining thematically coherent through interconnected lyricism following an abstract narrative.

Rapid City Muscle Car clips
Clips of five songs from Rapid City Muscle Car highlighting the eclectic nature of the album.

Delving into wider-reaching and more experimental territory than their punk rock roots, the result is arguably the Daddies' most musically eclectic work. Building upon the band's then-standard repertoire of swing and funk, Rapid City Muscle Car weaves between ska punk, rockabilly, country, psychedelia, big band and lounge. The album also makes extensive use of outside instruments, adding acoustic guitars, accordions, clarinets and vibraphones in addition to the band's keyboards and horn section. A full big band orchestra is used on "Come Back to Me", a cover song taken from the 1965 Burton Lane/Alan Jay Lerner Broadway musical On a Clear Day You Can See Forever.

"Come Back to Me" was later re-recorded for the Daddies' 2014 Rat Pack tribute album Please Return the Evening, featuring only the band's regular line-up as opposed to a full orchestra.

== Track listing ==
All songs composed by Steve Perry, except where otherwise noted.

No.	Title	Length
1.	"The Search"	2:46
2.	"Sockable Face Club"	3:46
3.	"Chrysalis"	4:09
4.	"The Ding-Dong Daddy of the D-Car Line"	3:34
5.	"Equus"	3:33
6.	"Mister White Keys"	3:08
7.	"Skyline Drive"	4:20
8.	"Pink Elephant"	3:42
9.	"Hazel, South Dakota"	3:55
10.	"Lovers Understand"	4:25
11.	"Johanna of the Spirits"	3:05
12.	"Inertia Rhapsody"	3:06
13.	"Bobby Kennedy"	3:09
14.	"Come Back to Me" (Burton Lane, Alan Jay Lerner)	2:40
15.	"The Impossible Dream"	4:35
Total length:		53:53

=== Previous availability ===
- The same recording of "The Ding-Dong Daddy of the D-Car Line" (then titled "Ding Dong Daddy") was first released on a 1992 7" entitled The Daddies.

== Personnel ==
Cherry Poppin' Daddies

- Steve Perry – vocals
- Dang Oulette (Dan Schmid) – bass
- Dana Heitman – trumpet, trombone
- Chris Azorr – keyboards
- Brian West – drums, vibes, percussion
- Adrian Baxter – tenor saxophone, bass clarinet
- Jason Moss – lead guitar

Additional musicians

- Brooks Brown – alto saxophone, clarinet
- John Fohl – guitar on track 4
- James Phillips – tenor saxophone on track 4

The First Church of Sinatra

Featured on track 14:

- Tim Allums – trumpet
- Mark Berney – trumpet
- Dave Van Handel – trombone
- Glenn Bonney – trombone
- Wayne Conkey – bass trombone
- Ross Warren – alto saxophone
- Tim Willcox – alto saxophone
- James Phillips – tenor saxophone
- Richard Coon (Temple) – baritone saxophone

Production

- Tracks 1–2, 4, 6–7, & 9 engineered and mixed by Bill Barnett at Gung Ho Studio in Eugene, Oregon
- Tracks 5, 8, 10, 12–15 engineered by Dana Heitman at Space Age Bachelor Pad Studio, mixed by Bill Barnett
- Track 3 recorded at Space Age Bachelor Pad Studio by Bob Levy
- Track 11 recorded at Dogfish by Drew Canulette
