= Please Return the Evening =

Studio album by Cherry Poppin' Daddies
- Released: July 29, 2014
- Recorded: 2012–2013 at Gung Ho Studio in Eugene, Oregon
- Length: 45:22
- Label: Space Age Bachelor Pad
- Producer: Steve Perry

Cherry Poppin' Daddies chronology
White Teeth, Black Thoughts (2013)	Please Return the Evening (2014)	The Boop-A-Doo (2016)

Please Return the Evening — the Cherry Poppin' Daddies Salute the Music of the Rat Pack is a tribute album and seventh studio (ninth overall) album by American ska-swing band the Cherry Poppin' Daddies, released on July 29, 2014, by Space Age Bachelor Pad Records.

A collection of loyal covers of songs performed or popularized by the trio of Frank Sinatra, Dean Martin and Sammy Davis Jr. collectively known as the Rat Pack, Please Return the Evening was the first Daddies album not to feature original music by lead singer-songwriter Steve Perry, and the first in a trilogy of cover albums designed to showcase the Daddies' swing and jazz influences, subsequently followed by The Boop-A-Doo in 2016.

== Overview ==
Please Return the Evening consists entirely of cover versions of songs performed and popularized by the "Rat Pack" of Frank Sinatra, Dean Martin and Sammy Davis Jr. In stark contrast to the Daddies' previous studio albums, the album features no original material by Daddies frontman Steve Perry while also focusing exclusively on traditional swing and jazz music, without any of the ska, rockabilly or rock influences which typically make up much of the band's sound.

In interviews detailing the project, Perry described Please Return the Evening as "a total labor of love", explaining at great length the influence that the Rat Pack had on the Cherry Poppin' Daddies since the group's beginning, noting that the band regularly played covers from the Great American Songbook even during their earliest incarnation as a punk rock band: "[the Daddies would] be playing and the crowds would be jumping off the stage, and to chill everybody down we'd do a Sinatra tune or something...[that music's] always been in our quiver and we love that kind of vibe". Perry noted elsewhere, "I just find the easy breezy, warm evening sophistication feel of that music very attractive...so [this album] is just a nod to that side of us".

"Come Back to Me", a song originally from the 1965 Burton Lane/Alan Jay Lerner musical On a Clear Day You Can See Forever and popularly covered by Davis, was originally covered on the Daddies' 1994 album Rapid City Muscle Car before being re-recorded for Please Return the Evening.

== Production history and release ==
Throughout 2012 and into 2013, the Daddies began playing select live shows across the United States billed as "The Cherry Poppin' Daddies Salute the Music of the Rat Pack", performing an equal mix of Rat Pack covers and songs from the band's own repertoire of swing music. In the days leading up to the July 2013 release of White Teeth, Black Thoughts, Steve Perry revealed in an interview with Billboard magazine that the Daddies had nearly completed recording for their next project, a tribute to the music of the Rat Pack, and would be releasing it sometime the following year. Updates on the album's status went mostly unreported as the Daddies spent the remainder of the year touring behind White Teeth, Black Thoughts until January 2014, when Perry divulged the title of the album and a tentative release date in the summer.

Starting with a performance in El Cajon, California on May 9, 2014, the Daddies discreetly began selling CD copies of Please Return the Evening exclusively at their live shows. On July 2, the band formally announced the album with a post on their website, confirming an official release date of July 29 and commencing pre-orders shortly afterwards. On July 23, The New York Times hosted a stream of the album on the Press Play media section of their website.

On July 22, American Songwriter hosted an exclusive music video for the Daddies' cover of "Come Fly with Me", depicting Perry singing the song against various backdrops shot on location in The Bahamas. In a September 2 interview with The Huffington Post, Perry debuted a second video for "Fly Me to the Moon", depicting the band as well as Perry's wife and daughter as members of The Addams Family, shot at the historic Shelton McMurphey Johnson House in Eugene, Oregon. Perry elaborated on the stylistic choice for the video, noting "we really liked the idea of the passionate Gomez and Morticia relationship. Even though the Addams' are a family of creeps, their familial love is strong. It's them against the world. We can relate to that on a family as well as a musical level".

=== Critical reception ===
Please Return the Evening was positively received by music critics. Jack Goodstein, writing for BlogCritics, rated the album four out of five stars, complimenting the Daddies for pulling off the material "in [their] own way" and singling out Perry as an "impressive vocalist", concluding "It is good to know that with the likes of the Cherry Poppin' Daddies working on it, swinging jazz, old and new, is in good hands". The Herald-Sun expressed similar sentiments, writing "only the Rat Pack is the Rat Pack, but Cherry Poppin' Daddies do a darn good job performing it as themselves", selecting the band's rendition of "That's Life" as a standout track.

== Track listing ==
No.	Title	Writer(s)	Length
1.	"The Best Is Yet to Come"	Cy Coleman/Carolyn Leigh	2:49
2.	"Come Fly With Me"	Sammy Cahn/Jimmy Van Heusen	3:09
3.	"The Lady Is a Tramp"	Rodgers/Hart	3:27
4.	"Ain't That a Kick in the Head"	Cahn/Van Heusen	2:25
5.	"Fly Me to the Moon"	Bart Howard	2:44
6.	"I'm Gonna Live Until I Die"	Al Hoffman/Walter Kent/Manny Curtis	2:00
7.	"Luck Be a Lady"	Frank Loesser	4:59
8.	"I've Got You Under My Skin"	Cole Porter	3:33
9.	"Mr. Success"	Frank Sinatra/Hank Sanicola/Edwin Greines	2:41
10.	"The Way You Look Tonight"	Jerome Kern/Dorothy Fields	3:24
11.	"Ring-A-Ding-Ding"	Cahn/Van Heusen	2:47
12.	"Just One of Those Things"	Porter	3:12
13.	"The Boys' Night Out"	Cahn/Van Heusen	2:28
14.	"Come Back to Me"	Alan Jay Lerner/Burton Lane	2:42
15.	"That's Life"	Dean Kay/Kelly Gordon	3:05
Total length:			45:22

== Personnel ==
Cherry Poppin' Daddies

- Steve Perry - vocals, guitar
- Dan Schmid - bass
- Dana Heitman - trumpet
- Willie Matheis - tenor sax
- William Seiji Marsh - guitar
- Joe Freuen - trombone
- Andy Page - alto saxophone
- Paul Owen - drums

Additional musicians

- Kevin Congleton - drums (tracks 1–15)
- Joe Manis - alto sax (tracks 1–15)
- Whitney Moulton - bass (tracks 1–14)
- Greg Goebel - piano (tracks 1–5, 8, 11, 12, 14)
- Pius Cheung - vibraphone (track 12)
