= Soul Caddy =

2000 album by Cherry Poppin' Daddies

Studio album by Cherry Poppin' Daddies
- Released: October 3, 2000
- Studio: Gung Ho, New York City; Sear Sound, New York City
- Genre: Hard rock; punk rock; dance-pop; psychedelic pop; rockabilly
- Length: 43:33
- Label: Mojo
- Producer: Steve Perry; Tony Visconti, Jack Joseph Puig

Cherry Poppin' Daddies chronology
| Zoot Suit Riot (1997) | Soul Caddy (2000) | Susquehanna (2008) |

Singles from Soul Caddy
- 1. "Diamond Light Boogie" Released: 2000

Soul Caddy is the fourth studio album by American band the Cherry Poppin' Daddies, released on October 3, 2000, by Mojo Records.

Written and recorded after the multi-platinum success of their 1997 compilation Zoot Suit Riot, Soul Caddy moved away from the swing revival movement which had brought them temporary fame, drawing upon retro pop, rock, and soul influences and addressing themes of cultural alienation in its lyrics. Released to little promotion or mainstream recognition, Soul Caddy was a commercial failure, bringing the Daddies' full-time touring career to an end and initiating a hiatus from recording until the release of Susquehanna in 2008.

== Album overview ==
Following the success of their 1997 swing music compilation Zoot Suit Riot, the Cherry Poppin' Daddies decided to return to the multi-genre format of their earlier albums for Soul Caddy, weaving an eclectic variety of musical styles around the band's characteristic mix of rock, swing, and ska.

Singer-songwriter Steve Perry explained in interviews that the album's primary stylistic elements were derived from the rock and pop music of the 1960s and 1970s, namely Motown soul and British Mod, of which Perry has long been influenced by.

Much of Soul Caddy is punctuated by tracks of soul, ska and rhythm and blues, also incorporating such diverse musical styles as funk ("My Mistake"), jazz ("The Saddest Thing I Know"), punk rock ("Irish Whiskey") and psychedelic folk ("Grand Mal").

The leading track and first single off Soul Caddy was the glam rock pastiche "Diamond Light Boogie". Following the huge success of the band's 1997 swing single "Zoot Suit Riot", Perry sought to write a song which would introduce a truer perspective of the Daddies' sound to a wider audience and help bridge the gap between their swing-oriented fanbase and non-swing music. "Diamond Light Boogie" worked as a musical and lyrical homage to the glam era of the early 1970s, written to fuse the guitar riff-driven melodies of bands such as T. Rex with the rhythmic backbeat and upbeat horn section common of jump blues and swing.

Perry has described Soul Caddy as a loose concept album reflecting his own temporary experience with fame, drawing upon feelings of social alienation, disillusionment and dissatisfaction with the cultural zeitgeist. Perry described Soul Caddy as a "bittersweet" record about "being alienated and hoping to connect", noting the central themes of the albums as being about loneliness and the search for meaning in a "technically sophisticated yet soulless society". In an interview with Gallery, Perry explained:

...that's the whole point of the record: it's not about what's on the outside, it's what's on the interior. And the fact is, a lot of the songs, to put it in a nutshell, are about trying to reach out and be with other people in the world and not having a very easy time of it. My feeling is that most people in the United States are exterior, superficial sort of people, and that makes me really lonely. Things in the U.S. are about celebrity and money and success. We talk about certain huge bands that have absolutely no value, but when they sell a zillion records, everybody starts looking at them and turning them over and thinking, there must be some value here. There's not. It's bullshit.

== Production history ==
After finishing their initial touring behind the release of Zoot Suit Riot in late 1997, the Daddies started production on their next studio album in as early as February 1998. During these recording sessions, the band had begun recording tracks for upwards of sixteen songs, much of which was heavily ska and Mod-influenced. In the following months, however, "Zoot Suit Riot" unexpectedly emerged as a hit single on modern rock radio, rocketing the album to the top of Billboard's Top Heatseekers chart and propelling the Daddies to the forefront of the burgeoning swing revival movement. Mojo Records insisted that the band leave the studio and immediately begin touring again, a tour which ultimately lasted for over a year as Zoot Suit Riot grew to surpass sales of over two million units.

When the Daddies finally returned to the studio in the fall of 1999, Perry felt the previous recordings had become "stale", and the band began work on writing new songs and re-writing the older ones. Openly discontent with the media's persistent typecasting of the Daddies as a generic "retro swing band" at the expense of their dominant ska and punk influences, Perry started writing more diverse musical textures into the album rather than merely return to an overtly swing-oriented sound. In interviews given during this time, he voiced his desire to create an album which could bridge the gaps between their swing fanbase and their non-swing music. "We don't want to disappoint people", he told ABC News, "Hopefully, now we can give [the fans] a sense of what they want but still be able to be ourselves. The ultimate thing would be to be popular and have a lot of people know what you're really like and like you for it."

To help lend a vintage authenticity to the album's 1970s-influenced sound, Perry brought in several notable guest musicians and producers from the era. Legendary glam rock producer and David Bowie collaborator Tony Visconti served as a supervising producer on "Diamond Light Boogie", while former Turtles and Mothers of Invention vocalist Mark Volman featured as a backing vocalist on the song. Further backing vocals throughout the album were provided by Motown artist Ada Dyer and Luther Vandross and Quincy Jones singer Paulette McWilliams, while free jazz saxophonist Dewey Redman featured on "The Saddest Thing I Know" and world music percussionist Carol Steele, who recorded with Peter Gabriel and Tears for Fears among others, played on the song "Stay (Don't Just Stay)". Lee Jeffries, steel guitarist for western swing band Big Sandy & His Fly-Rite Boys, supposedly performed on a song which didn't make it onto the album.

== Release and reception ==
Despite allowing the Daddies complete creative control over the production of Soul Caddy, Mojo Records had a largely unenthusiastic reaction to the finished album. Claiming that the new material was "not like the Cherry Poppin' Daddies people know and love", the label did little to promote the album, at one point releasing the single for "Diamond Light Boogie" without the band's name on it, allegedly due to a hesitancy over releasing a rock single from a band largely known for swing music. With virtually no major marketing or promotion behind it, Soul Caddy was quietly released on October 3, 2000.

Professional ratings
Review scores
| Source | Rating |
|---|---|
| Allmusic | 3/5 stars |

Soul Caddy met with mixed to negative critical reviews upon release, the majority of criticism ironically centered on the album's lack of swing music. Some reviewers, however, seemed oblivious to the Daddies' eclectic ska punk history: Steve Greenlee of The Boston Globe began his review with "neo-swing fans, beware", openly accusing the Daddies of abandoning their swing "roots" in favor of a trendier sound, while the Los Angeles Daily News echoed similar complaints, placing the album on their list of the 10 worst albums of 2000, the reviewer wondering what made a swing band "think it could get away with an album of recycled psychedelic pop". Critics were evenly divided over Soul Caddy's mix of genres; UGO's Hip Online wrote "[c]overing five or six genres on one album is just insane", noting "Soul Caddy has no cohesion and that ruins the enjoyment". Entertainment Weekly was annoyed by the way the band tackled each genre with the same "insufferable enthusiasm", remarking "Perry is a far better writer than he is a singer" and giving the album a C− rating. MTV.com offered perhaps the most overwhelmingly negative review, saying that Soul Caddy's "cheesy, super-compressed studio shine" had drained the album of its energy, leaving the "confusing" mix of genres feeling "washed-out [and] a bit depressing and Weird Al-like", summarizing the Daddies as "a band that's trying to show off their record collection, rather than their creativity".

On the positive end of the critical spectrum, some reviewers responded well to Soul Caddy's eclectic bent. Allmusic, despite rating it with a modest score of 3 out of 5 stars, wrote "Soul Caddy is flat-out fun and there's no way around that", praising the album's "witty and smart lyricism" and assortment of genres as "certainly refreshing coming from a band who was assumed to be generic retro swing" and noting "for the listeners who take time to believe in it, Soul Caddy will be impressively surprising". The Denver Westword lauded the band for breaking away from the retro mentality of the swing revival, saying of the Daddies "they've got more spunk, more sense of adventure and more life than nearly every other swing act on the scene", praising the album's streaks of rock and punk for giving neo-swing "a much-needed facelift".

=== Impact on the band ===
Bogged down by poor reviews, neither Soul Caddy nor "Diamond Light Boogie" achieved any commercial or chart success upon release, casting an unshakeable pall over the Daddies' subsequent US tour in promotion of the album. The Soul Caddy tour saw the band intentionally downplaying their swing side in favor of their wider body of sounds, a choice which didn't fare well with the Daddies' target audiences. Speaking retrospectively in a 2002 interview, Perry elaborated "we went out on tour and most people saw us as a swing band because of the success of Zoot Suit Riot...we felt this tension to be something we weren't". Already dissatisfied with the tour's outcome, consistently low ticket sales ultimately brought the Daddies' tour to an early and unfortunate close.

In December 2000, the Daddies mutually agreed upon taking an indefinite hiatus from performing, citing both Soul Caddy's commercial underperformance and the band's personal exhaustion from nearly non-stop touring since the release of Zoot Suit Riot as reason. The Daddies would eventually reform in February 2002 to sporadically play one-off local shows and festival appearances for the next several years before returning to touring and recording with their self-produced and independently released album Susquehanna in early 2008.

== Track listing ==
All tracks are written by Steve Perry.

| No. | Title | Length |
|---|---|---|
| 1. | "Diamond Light Boogie" | 3:42 |
| 2. | "Swingin' With Tiger Woods (The Big Swing)" | 2:45 |
| 3. | "God Is a Spider" | 3:31 |
| 4. | "Stay, Don't Just Stay (If You're Gonna)" | 3:39 |
| 5. | "Grand Mal" | 3:10 |
| 6. | "Soul Cadillac" | 3:29 |
| 7. | "Irish Whiskey" | 3:35 |
| 8. | "So Long Toots" | 2:30 |
| 9. | "My Mistake" | 3:27 |
| 10. | "End of the Night" | 2:46 |
| 11. | "Bleeding Ceremony" | 3:42 |
| 12. | "Uncle Ray" | 3:22 |
| 13. | "Saddest Thing I Know" | 3:49 |
| Total length: | | 43:33 |

=== Previous availability ===
- A previous studio version of "Irish Whiskey" appears on the Daddies' 1996 album Kids on the Street.
- An alternate recording of "So Long Toots" first appeared on the soundtrack album for the 1999 film Blast from the Past.

== Credits ==
Band

- Steve Perry – lead vocals, guitar (1 – 2, 4 – 6, 9 – 11), keyboard effects, stylophone
- Dana Heitman – trumpet (1 – 4, 6, 8 – 10, 12 – 13)
- Ian Early – alto saxophone, bass clarinet (1 – 6, 8 – 10, 12 – 13)
- Sean Flannery – tenor saxophone, bass clarinet (1 – 6, 8 – 10, 12 – 13)
- Dustin Lanker – keyboards (1 – 3, 8 – 9)
- Jason Moss – guitar
- Dan Schmid – bass guitar
- Tim Donahue – drums

Guests

- Bryce Peltier – trombone (3, 10)
- John MacDonald — trombone (3, 8, 10)
- Dewey Redman – tenor saxophone on track 13
- Johnny Goetchius – keyboards, backing vocals (1, 4 – 6, 10, 12 – 13)
- Carol Steele – percussion on track 4
- Ada Dyer – backing vocals (4, 6, 9)
- Paulette McWilliams – backing vocals (4, 6, 9)
- Mark Volman – backing vocals on track 1

Production

- Jay Rifkin – executive producer
- Bob Ludwig – mastering
- Billy Barnett – engineer
- Recorded at Gung Ho Studios in Eugene, Oregon
- Mixed by Jack Joseph Puig at Ocean Way Recording, except tracks 4, 6, 9 and 13 at Gung Ho Studios
- Richard Ash – engineer at Ocean Way Recording
- Additional recording at Sears Sound in New York City
