= Kids on the Street =

Studio album by Cherry Poppin' Daddies
- Released: February 6, 1996
- Recorded: 1995
- Genre: Alternative rock
- Length: 52:26
- Labels: Space Age Bachelor Pad; Caroline Records
- Producer: Steve Perry

Cherry Poppin' Daddies chronology
Rapid City Muscle Car (1994)	Kids on the Street (1996)	Zoot Suit Riot (1997)

Professional ratings
Review scores
Source	Rating
Allmusic	3/5 stars

Kids on the Street is the third studio album by American band the Cherry Poppin' Daddies, released in 1996 on Space Age Bachelor Pad Records.

== Overview ==
By 1996, the Cherry Poppin' Daddies had established themselves as a staple of the West Coast third wave ska scene, carving out a steady touring niche alongside bands such as The Mighty Mighty Bosstones and Reel Big Fish. However, the Daddies' next album strayed from the brass-heavy swing and funk which dominated their first two releases in favor of further exploration into punk and ska.

With lead singer Steve Perry now assuming a role as a rhythm guitarist, Kids on the Street predominantly features guitar-driven ska and punk, though also branches into such genres as southern rock ("Luther Lane"), western swing ("Silver-Tongued Devil") and jazz ("Here Comes the Snake"). Perry has stated that the abundance of straightforward rock and punk songs on the album in place of the eclecticism of their previous records was partially due to his playing guitar on the album, as he described his guitar skills as "limited".

== Release and reception ==
Released in the midst of the American ska revival in 1996, Kids on the Street was the Daddies' most successful album at that time. Distributed through indie label Caroline Records, the album sold 25,000 copies in its first week, charting on The Rocket's Retail Sales Top Twenty for over seven months and eventually making its way onto Rolling Stone's Alternative Chart. Several of the album's songs appeared on numerous mid-1990s ska compilations, helping spread the Daddies' name further outside of their Pacific Northwest-centered fanbase.

Two contemporary reviews in Eugene's The Register-Guard both gave Kids on the Street a positive reception. One reviewer called the album a "great CD" that was "suitable for just hanging out and doing homework" to and for "long, boring car trips", while another reviewer, though claiming that Kids occasionally branched into "the monotony of 'alternative'", noted that it "definitely would be possible to derive pleasure from listening to this CD. The music is wonderful!"

== Track listing ==
All tracks are written by Steve Perry.

No.	Title	Length
1.	"Kids on the Street"	3:17
2.	"Say It to My Face"	3:02
3.	"We'll Always Have Paris"	5:07
4.	"Trapped Inside the Planet of the Roller-Skating Bees"	2:52
5.	"Millionaire"	4:00
6.	"Dave's Pie Shoppe"	0:59
7.	"Cosa Nostra"	3:50
8.	"Irish Whiskey"	3:42
9.	"Flower Fight with Morrissey"	3:19
10.	"Modsquadrophenia"	4:19
11.	"Silver-Tongued Devil"	3:48
12.	"Here Comes the Snake"	3:22
13.	"The Enemy Within"	3:51
14.	"Luther Lane"	3:47
15.	"Don Quixote"	3:03
Total length:		52:26

=== Alternative versions ===
- "Here Comes the Snake", the only Kids on the Street track which appeared on the Daddies' Zoot Suit Riot compilation, was re-recorded and released as a single in 1998, featuring a faster tempo, additional trumpet and a theremin replacing the whistle. This version was also used in the soundtrack of the film Three to Tango.
- "Irish Whiskey" was re-recorded for the Daddies' 2000 album Soul Caddy, omitting the horns and including an extended bridge.

== Credits ==
Cherry Poppin' Daddies

- Steve Perry – vocals, guitar
- Dan Schmid – bass
- Chris Azorr – keyboards
- Dana Heitman – trumpet, trombone
- Jason Moss – lead guitar
- Sean Flannery – tenor saxophone
- Rex Trimm – alto saxophone
- Adam Glogauer – drums

Additional musicians

- Adrian Baxter – tenor saxophone on tracks 2, 4–5, 10–11, 13–15
- John Fohl – guitar, lap steel guitar on tracks 11, 14
- Sean Oldham – drums on tracks 4–5, 7, 11–14
- Jason Palmer – drums on tracks 2, 10
- James Phillips – alto saxophone on track 8

Production

- All songs engineered and mixed by Bill Barnett at Gung Ho Studios in Eugene, Oregon
- Additional engineering by Dana Heitman
