= Ferociously Stoned =

Studio album by Cherry Poppin' Daddies
- Released: November 20, 1990; December 12, 1994 (re-issue)
- Recorded: August – September 1990
- Studio: Gung Ho Studios in Eugene, Oregon
- Labels: Sub Par; Space Age Bachelor Pad
- Producers: Cherry Poppin' Daddies, Bill Barnett

Cherry Poppin' Daddies chronology
4 From On High (1989)	Ferociously Stoned (1990)	Rapid City Muscle Car (1994)

Alternate cover
- 1990 CD cover

Alternate cover
- 1994 re-release cover

Professional ratings
Review scores
Source	Rating
Allmusic	2.5/5 stars

Ferociously Stoned is the debut album by American band the Cherry Poppin' Daddies, released in November 1990 on Sub Par Records. It was subsequently re-released on the Daddies' own independent label Space Age Bachelor Pad Records in 1994.

== Composition ==
Mixing thumping bass and heavy brass, Ferociously Stoned draws heavily from the punk rock and funk influences which dominated the Daddies' early music. The record also features a prominent streak of the jazz and swing-inspired sounds which would soon become a hallmark of the band's style. While the album is driven primarily by funk and swing, Ferociously Stoned also features experiments in psychedelic pop ("The Lifeboat Mutiny"), disco ("Suicide Kings") and James Brown-style rhythm and blues ("You Better Move").

== Release and reception ==
Following the success of the Daddies' 1989 demo tape 4 From On High which helped build the band a dedicated local cult following, Ferociously Stoned set a near-record for all-time advance sales in Eugene, Oregon's record stores, coming in second only to R.E.M. Upon release, the album became a regional success, remaining for over a year on The Rocket's Northwest Top Twenty list and receiving favorable reviews in The Oregonian and Alternative Press. At one point, the Daddies were planning an animated music video for the song "Teenage Brainsurgeon", though ultimately scrapped the idea due to production costs.

Ferociously Stoned was originally released on vinyl and CD by independent label Sub Par Records. The vinyl cover depicting three bikini-clad women clutching stones against a backwards American flag, while the subsequent CD release featuring only the band's name with censor bars over the words "Cherry" and "Poppin'". In March 1991, when the Daddies had temporarily shortened their name to "The Daddies" to alleviate the controversy surrounding their name, the album was re-released with the shortened band name and new cover art featuring a skeleton in formal wear, modeled after the Grateful Dead's "Uncle Sam" skeleton. In 1994, coinciding with the release of the Daddies' second album, Rapid City Muscle Car, Ferociously Stoned was re-issued on CD, restoring the band's full name and including the tracks from their 1989 demo tape 4 From On High as bonus content.

== Track listing ==
All songs written and composed by Steve Perry (M.C. Large Drink).

Kiss Me Side
No.	Title	Length
1.	"Drunk Daddy"	5:11
2.	"Teenage Brainsurgeon"	3:55
3.	"Answering Machine"	6:03
4.	"Midas in Reverse"	4:30
5.	"The Lifeboat Mutiny"	5:45

Kill Me Side
No.	Title	Length
6.	"Master and Slave"	4:07
7.	"Dirty Mutha Fuzz"	5:13
8.	"You Better Move"	2:44
9.	"Suicide Kings"	4:19
10.	"Flovilla Thatch Vs the Virile Garbageman"	3:46
11.	"Shake Your Lovemaker"	5:51
Total length:		49:24

1994 re-release bonus tracks (from the 1989 demo 4 From On High)
No.	Title	Length
12.	"Dr. Bones"	3:32
13.	"Diabolic Tastemaker"	5:12
14.	"Up from the Gutter"	4:30
15.	"Cherry Poppin' Daddy Strut"	3:05
Total length:		65:03

== Personnel ==
Cherry Poppin' Daddies

- M.C. Large Drink (Steve Perry) – vocals
- John Fohl – guitar
- Dan Schmid – bass
- Brian West – drums
- Chris Azorr – keyboards
- Brooks Brown – alto saxophone
- James Phillips – tenor saxophone
- Dana Heitman – trumpet

Additional musicians

- Tim Arnold – drums on tracks 12–15
- James Gossard – guitar on tracks 12–15
- Pat Dixon – bass trombone on tracks 13–14
- Patrick Detroit – baritone saxophone on tracks 13–14

Production

- Produced and arranged by the Cherry Poppin' Daddies and Bill Barnett
- Engineered by Bill Barnett and Michael Edwards
- Mixed at Gung Ho Studios by Bill Barnett, except "Dirty Mutha Fuzz", mixed by Michael Edwards
- Mastered by Bill Barnett
