= 2019 in American music =

The following is a list of events and releases that happened in 2019 in music in the United States.

== Notable events ==
=== January ===
- 2 – Daryl Dragon of Captain & Tennille died at the age of 76 due to renal failure, with his ex-wife Toni Tennille at his side.
- 7 – Andy Grammer performed the national anthem, and Imagine Dragons performed the halftime show during the 2019 College Football Playoff National Championship with special guest Lil Wayne.
- 17 – Christina Perri released her first album in five years, Songs for Carmella: Lullabies & Sing-a-Longs
- 18 – Pedro the Lion released their first album in fifteen years, Phoenix.
  - Sharon Van Etten released her first album in five years, Remind Me Tomorrow.
- 25 – Backstreet Boys released their first album in six years, DNA.

=== February ===
- 3 – Gladys Knight performed the National Anthem, and Maroon 5, Big Boi, and Travis Scott performed the halftime show during Super Bowl LIII at Mercedes-Benz Stadium in Atlanta, where their performance received negative reviews from the critics naming the worst Super Bowl performances in history.
- 8 – Jessica Pratt released her first album in four years, Quiet Signs.
- 10 – The 61st Annual Grammy Awards, hosted by Alicia Keys, took place. The show returned to Staples Center in Los Angeles. Childish Gambino and Kacey Musgraves took home the most awards with four each. Musgraves won Album of the Year with Golden Hour, while Gambino won both Record of the Year and Song of the Year for "This Is America". Dua Lipa won Best New Artist.

=== March ===
- 1 – Jonas Brothers released their first single in six years, Sucker, which reached #1 in eight countries, including the top of the Billboard Hot 100.
  - Queensrÿche released their first album in almost four years, The Verdict.
  - Gary Clark, Jr. released his first album in four years, This Land.
- 3–6 – The two part documentary Leaving Neverland provoked a backlash causing radio stations to ban Michael Jackson's music, in turn leading Jackson fans into protest.
- 8 – Misery Index released their first album in five years called Rituals of Power.
  - Tesla released their first album in five years, Shock.
- 22 – La Dispute released their first album in five years, Panorama.
- 29 – George Strait released his first album in four years, Honky Tonk Time Machine
- 31 – Rapper Nipsey Hussle was shot and killed out front of his store in Los Angeles, CA. He was 33 years old.

=== April ===
- 5 – Brooks & Dunn released their first album in twelve years, Reboot
  - Sara Bareilles released her first album in four years, Amidst the Chaos.
- 7 – The 54th Academy of Country Music Awards took place at the MGM Grand Garden Arena in Las Vegas.
  - Billie Eilish became the first musician born in the 21st century to top the Billboard 200 chart with When We All Fall Asleep, Where Do We Go?
- 17 – Motown Records celebrated 60th anniversary.
- 26 – Rob Thomas released his first album in four years, Chip Tooth Smile.
  - Taylor Swift, in collaboration with Panic! at the Disco lead Brendon Urie, released her highly anticipated lead single "ME!" off her seventh studio album Lover. The song made the biggest leap in Billboard Hot 100 history, from 100–2, and the song's music video broke the Vevo 24 hour record.

=== May ===
- 1 – The Billboard Music Awards took place in Las Vegas.
- 3 – Ashley Tisdale released her first album in 10 years, Symptoms.
  - – Bad Religion released their first album in six years, Age of Unreason.
  - – L7 released their first album in twenty years, Scatter the Rats.
  - – Vampire Weekend released their first album in six years, Father of the Bride.
- 10 – Ciara released her first album in four years, Beauty Marks.
  - – Possessed released their first album in 33 years, Revelations of Oblivion.
- 19 – Laine Hardy won the seventeenth season of American Idol. Alejandro Aranda is named runner-up.
- 21 – Maelyn Jarmon won the sixteen season of The Voice. Gyth Rigdon was the runner-up. Dexter Roberts and Andrew Sevener finished third and fourth place respectively.
- 24 – Flying Lotus released his first album in five years, Flamagra.

=== June ===
- 5 – The CMT Music Awards took place at the Bridgestone Arena in Nashville.
- 7 – Boxing Gandhis released their first album in seven years, Culture War.
  - Jonas Brothers released their first album in 10 years, Happiness Begins.
  - Perry Farrell released his first solo album in eighteen years, Kind Heaven.
- 11 – The New York Times Magazine publishes an investigative report by music journalist Jody Rosen, detailing the extent of the 2008 Universal fire. The article reveals that much of the fire's damage was concealed from the public for well over a decade, and that the full extent of the fire included the destruction of up to 175,000 master recordings of songs – both released and unreleased – by Universal Music Group-owned artists. UMG representatives would initially dispute the accuracy of the article, before eventually confirming that their archives had indeed sustained considerable losses as a result of the fire.
- 14 – Baroness released their first album in four years, Gold & Grey.
  - – Bruce Springsteen released his first album in five years and his first of all original material in seven years, Western Stars.
  - – Madonna released her first album in four years, Madame X.
  - – The Cherry Poppin' Daddies released Bigger Life, their first album of original material in six years and their first ska album in 11 years.
- 16 – Adema parted ways with original lead singer Mark Chavez for the third time. He was replaced by Julien-K frontman and former Orgy guitarist Ryan Shuck.
- 19 – Original Unwritten Law drummer Wade Youman left the band for the second time.
- 21 – The Raconteurs released their first album in eleven years, Help Us Stranger.
- 28 – The Black Keys released their first album in five years, Let's Rock.

=== July ===
- 1 – Janet Weiss left Sleater-Kinney after 23 years with the band.
- 5 – Westside Gunn released his major debut album FLYGOD is An Awesome GOD
- 26 – Mini Mansions released their first album in four years, Guy Walks Into A Bar.
- 29 – Lil Nas X reached his seventeenth week atop the Billboard Hot 100 with "Old Town Road"; obtaining the all-time record.

=== August ===
- 2 – Diana DeGarmo released her first album in 15 years, Gemini.
  - O-Town released their first album in five years, The O.T.W.N. Album.
- 9 – Slipknot released their first album in five years, We Are Not Your Kind.
- 16 – Sleater-Kinney released their first album in four years, The Center Won't Hold.
- 19 – Billie Eilish became the first artist born in the 21st century to top the Billboard Hot 100 with "Bad Guy"
- 26 – The VMA's took place at the Prudential Center in East Rutherford, New Jersey.
- 30 – Tool released their first studio album in 13 years, Fear Inoculum.

=== September ===
- 6 – Melanie Martinez released her first album in four years, K-12.
- 9 – Kelly Clarkson debuts her daytime talk show, The Kelly Clarkson Show. During the show's seven season run, she started off the show with Kellyokes, covering different artists and occasionally singing her own music. Many of these went viral.
- 13 – Cold released their first album in eight years, The Things We Can't Stop.
  - Eddie Money died at age 70 following a battle with esophageal cancer.
- 15 – Ric Ocasek, lead singer of The Cars, was found dead at 75.
- 26 – Nivea released her first album in thirteen years, Mirrors.
- 27 – Magnapop released their first album in ten years, The Circle Is Round.

=== October ===
- 4 – that dog released their first album in 22 years, Old LP. It was also their first album without founding member Petra Haden.
  - Akon released his first album in ten years, El Negreeto.
  - Lagwagon released their first album in five years, Railer.
- 11 – Chris Knight released his first album in seven years, Almost Daylight.
- 29 – After seven months of banned Michael Jackson music, some radio stations re-added some of his hits.

=== November ===
- 1 – Hootie & the Blowfish released their first album in fourteen years, Imperfect Circle.
- 2 – Guns N' Roses conclude the Not in This Lifetime... Tour, which began in April 2016, at the Colosseum at Caesars Palace in Las Vegas. The tour ends as the highest-grossing of all time by an American act and the third-highest overall.
- 13 – The Country Music Association Awards took place. Hosted by Carrie Underwood with special guests: Dolly Parton and Reba McEntire.
- 15 – Céline Dion released her first English-language studio album in 6 years with Courage and became her first number-one album since 2002 in the US (5th overall).
- 18 – Mötley Crüe utilized a loophole in their "Cessation of Touring" agreement to reform for a stadium tour with Def Leppard, Poison and Joan Jett & the Blackhearts in summer 2020.
- 24 – The American Music Awards took place at the Microsoft Theater in Los Angeles. Taylor Swift won the most awards with six.
- 29 – Cattle Decapitation released their first album in four years, Death Atlas.
- 30 – Slayer played their final concert at The Forum in Inglewood, California, subsequently disbanding 38 years after their formation.

=== December ===
- 6 – Sufjan Stevens released his first album in four years, titled The Decalogue.
- 8 – Rapper Juice WRLD died of a seizure at Midway International Airport in Chicago, Illinois. He was 21 years old.
- 15 – Red Hot Chili Peppers parted ways with guitarist Josh Klinghoffer, and then announced that John Frusciante would rejoin them for the third time.
- 17 – Jake Hoot was named winner of the seventeenth season of The Voice. Ricky Duran was named runner-up. Katie Kadan and Rose Short finished third and fourth place respectively.
- 21 – 25 years after its original release, Mariah Carey's "All I Want for Christmas is You" reached No. 1 for the first time on Billboard Hot 100, breaking several records and becoming her 19th No. 1 on the chart.

== Bands formed ==
- Boys World
- Scowl
- Simple Creatures
- Sunday Service

== Bands reformed ==
- Anberlin
- Bikini Kill
- The Black Crowes
- Black Flag
- Damone
- Go Radio
- Gossip
- Heart
- Iglu & Hartly
- Jawbox
- Jonas Brothers
- Lunachicks
- Meg & Dia
- Methods of Mayhem
- Metro Station
- Monty Are I
- Motion City Soundtrack
- Mr. Bungle
- My Chemical Romance
- Phantom Planet
- The Pussycat Dolls
- Rage Against the Machine
- The Rapture
- Scary Kids Scaring Kids
- Thelonious Monster
- There for Tomorrow
- Vio-lence

== Bands disbanded ==
- The Apocalypse Blues Revue
- Balance and Composure
- Chris Robinson Brotherhood
- Cute Is What We Aim For
- Femme Fatale
- Fischerspooner
- Get Scared
- J. Roddy Walston and the Business
- The Muffs
- Nitro
- The Pains of Being Pure at Heart
- Pillorian
- Prophets of Rage
- Slayer
- Superjoint
- Teen
- Yeasayer

== Albums released in 2019 ==
=== January ===
Date	Album	Artist	Genre (s)
4	John Garcia and the Band Of Gold	John Garcia and the Band of Gold	Hard rock; heavy metal
4	Ode To A Friend	Old Sea Brigade	Pop; folk
11	Magnolia	Randy Houser	Country
11	A Good Friend Is Nice	Jack & Jack	Pop-rap
11	Twenty	Taking Back Sunday	Alternative rock; rock
17	Songs for Carmella: Lullabies & Sing-a-Longs	Christina Perri	Lullaby
18	Look Alive	Guster	Alternative rock
18	Myth Of A Man	Night Beats	Garage rock; soul
18	Who Do You Trust?	Papa Roach	Hard rock; nu metal; rap rock
18	Phoenix	Pedro the Lion	Indie rock
18	Rattlesnake	Neyla Pekarek	Indie rock
18	A Real Good Kid	Mike Posner	Electropop; alternative hip hop
18	Heard It in a Past Life	Maggie Rogers	Rock
18	Native Tongue	Switchfoot	Alternative rock
18	Outer Peace	Toro y Moi	Chillwave; house
18	Remind Me Tomorrow	Sharon Van Etten	Indie rock; folk; folk rock
24	Weezer (Teal Album)	Weezer	Rock
25	DNA	Backstreet Boys	Pop
25	Why You So Crazy	The Dandy Warhols	Alternative rock
25	Live in Atlantic City	Heart	
25	Almost Free	FIDLAR	Skate punk; garage rock
25	Stay Human Vol. II	Michael Franti & Spearheaded	Folk; pop
25	Mystery Hour	Pavo Pavo	Indie pop; art rock
25	Oliver Appropriate	Say Anything	Rock
30	20 Years and Counting	Allister	Pop punk; alternative rock

=== February ===
Date	Album	Artist	Genre (s)
1	Seasons	American Authors	Pop rock; rock
1	Mall of Fortune	Harriet Brown	R&B; soul
1	Zeppelin Over China	Guided By Voices	Indie Rock; Lo-fi
1	Tides of a Teardrop	Mandolin Orange	Americana; folk
1	Helping Hands... Live & Acoustic at the Masonic	Metallica	Acoustic; live
1	Ruthless	The Moth & The Flame	Alternative rock
1	Midnight	Set It Off	Pop punk; pop rock
8	Thank U, Next	Ariana Grande	Pop; R&B; trap
8	Sunshine Rock	Bob Mould	Punk rock; alternative rock
8	Varshons II	The Lemonheads	Rock
8	Buoys	Panda Bear	Psychedelic pop; electronica
8	Quiet Signs	Jessica Pratt	Folk
8	The Love Train	Meghan Trainor	Pop
14	Let's Be Frank	Trisha Yearwood	Jazz
15	Can't Say I Ain't Country	Florida Georgia Line	Country
15	Oh Boy	Harlem	Garage rock; indie rock
22	OK, I'm Sick	Badflower	Rock; alternative rock
22	Distance over Time	Dream Theater	Progressive metal
22	The Last Word	The O'Jays	R&B; soul
22	The Wings of War	Overkill	Thrash metal
22	Lips on Lips	Tiffany Young	Pop

=== March ===
Date	Album	Artist	Genre (s)
1	This Land	Gary Clark, Jr.	Blues rock; R&B; soul
1	Death Race for Love	Juice WRLD	Hip hop
1	The Verdict	Queensrÿche	Hard rock; heavy metal
1	Weezer (Black Album)	Weezer	Alternative rock; power pop
8	This is How You Smile	Helado Negro	Folk; pop
8	Dusty Notes	Meat Puppets	Alternative rock
8	Rituals of Power	Misery Index	Hard rock; heavy metal; death metal
8	GIRL	Maren Morris	Country
8	There Will Be No Intermission	Amanda Palmer	Alternative rock
8	Shock	Tesla	Rock; heavy metal
12	Blue Blood	Idiot Pilot	Alternative rock; electronic rock
15	Only Things We Love	Blaqk Audio	Synth-pop
15	Egowreck	The Faint	Indie rock; new wave
15	Cash Cabin Sessions Vol 3	Todd Snider	Folk rock; roots rock
22	American Football	American Football	Indie rock; math rock
22	Mystic Truth	Bad Suns	Alternative rock
22	Panorama	La Dispute	Post hardcore; spoken word
22	On The Line	Jenny Lewis	Indie rock
22	Nothing Happens	Wallows	Alternative rock; post-punk
22	Everybody One of a Kind	Wild Belle	Psychedelic pop
29	When We All Fall Asleep, Where Do We Go?	Billie Eilish	Electropop
29	Trauma	I Prevail	Metalcore
29	You Are OK	The Maine	Alternative rock; pop punk
29	Sing to Me Instead	Ben Platt	Pop
29	Strange Love (EP)	Simple Creatures	Alternative rock
29	Honky Tonk Time Machine	George Strait	Country
29	Uncle Walt's Band (Reissue)	Uncle Walt's Band	Folk
29	Side Effects	White Denim	Indie rock
29	The Valley	Whitechapel	Hard rock; heavy metal
29	Trunk Muzik III	Yelawolf	Hip hop; southern hip hop

=== April ===
Date	Album	Artist	Genre (s)
5	Reboot	Brooks & Dunn	Country
5	Brutalism	The Drums	Indie pop
5	It Rains Love	Lee Fields	Soul; R&B; funk
5	Free Spirit	Khalid	R&B
5	Bank on the Funeral	Matt Maeson	Alternative rock; folk
5	Stronger Than the Truth	Reba McEntire	Country
5	Periphery IV: Hail Stan	Periphery	Progressive metal; djent
5	The Seduction of Kansas	Priests	Punk rock; post-punk
12	State I'm In	Aaron Lewis	Country
12	The Darker the Weather // The Better the Man	Missio	Alternative rock; pop rock
12	Everybody Gets the Blues	Eric Reed	Jazz; R&B
19	Social Cues	Cage the Elephant	Indie rock; garage rock
19	Where Polly People Go To Read	Gus Dapperton	Indie pop
19	Fake Blood	Heart Attack Man	Punk rock; pop-punk; emo
19	Cuz I Love You	Lizzo	Hip hop; pop; indie pop
26	Neotheater	AJR	Indie pop; pop; alternative rock
26	Launch Fly Land	Dreamers	Alternative rock; pop rock
26	The Pink Chateau	In the Valley Below	Indie rock
26	Violet Street	Local Natives	Indie rock
26	Late Nights and Longnecks	Justin Moore	Country
26	In League With Dragons	The Mountain Goats	Indie rock; folk rock
26	Was It Even Real?	Olivia O'Brien	Pop
26	Hurts 2B Human	P!nk	Pop
26	Chip Tooth Smile	Rob Thomas	Rock; pop rock

=== May ===
Date	Album	Artist	Genre (s)
3	Age of Unreason	Bad Religion	Punk rock; melodic hardcore
3	Emerald Valley	Filthy Friends	Alternative rock
3	Pep Talks	Judah & the Lion	Americana; alternative rock
3	Scatter the Rats	L7	Grunge; alternative metal
3	From the Screen to Your Stereo 3 (EP)	New Found Glory	Pop punk
3	SYML	SYML	Alternative rock; electronic rock
3	Symptoms	Ashley Tisdale	Pop
3	Father of the Bride	Vampire Weekend	Indie rock; alternative rock
3	Front Porch	Joy Williams	Folk rock; pop
10	Enderness	A.A. Bondy	Alternative folk
10	Fake Tunes	Bear Hands	Post-punk; indie rock
10	Young Enough	Charly Bliss	Indie rock; power pop
10	Beauty Marks	Ciara	R&B; pop
10	Problems	The Get Up Kids	Emo; indie rock; post-punk
10	Revelations of Oblivion	Possessed	Death metal; thrash metal
10	Legacy! Legacy!	Jamila Woods	Soul; hip hop
17	Sonic Brew 20th Anniversary	Black Label Society	Hard rock; heavy metal
17	The Futures Still Ringing In My Ears	Sam Cohen	Rock; pop rock
17	Bad Sports	Jean Dawson	Experimental rock; indie pop
17	Living Mirage	The Head and the Heart	Indie rock; alternative rock
17	I Am Easy to Find	The National	Indie rock; alternative rock
17	Whirlwind	Maddie Poppe	Indie pop; folk
17	Igor	Tyler, the Creator	Hip hop
24	The Saint of Lost Clauses	Justin Townes Earle	Folk; country
24	Flamagra	Flying Lotus	Electronic; experimental
24	Modern Hymns	Guards	Indie rock; new wave
24	40	Stray Cats	Rockabilly
31	1000 Gecs	100 gecs	Hyperpop; experimental rock; electronic
31	Humanicide	Death Angel	Thrash metal
31	Invocations / Conversations	JR JR	Indie pop
31	Center Point Road	Thomas Rhett	Country
31	Blessings	Sublime with Rome	Alternative rock; ska punk
31	Dispassionate EP	together PANGEA	Garage rock; indie rock

=== June ===
Date	Album	Artist	Genre (s)
7	Culture War	Boxing Gandhis	Funk; soul
7	Final Transmission	Cave In	Metalcore
7	Kind Heaven	Perry Farrell	Alternative rock
7	Happiness Begins	Jonas Brothers	Pop
7	Renegade	Dylan LeBlanc	Americana; folk
7	Widow's Weeds	Silversun Pickups	Alternative rock; indie rock
7	Erotic Reruns	Yeasayer	Experimental rock
14	III	Bad Books	Indie rock; indie folk
14	Gold & Grey	Baroness	Alternative metal
14	Years To Burn	Calexico & Iron and Wine	Folk; folk rock; indie rock
14	Bigger Life	Cherry Poppin' Daddies	Ska punk; punk rock; funk rock
14	Mother Nature	The Dangerous Summer	Alternative rock
14	Modern World	Max Jury	Indie rock
14	Madame X	Madonna	Pop
14	Western Stars	Bruce Springsteen	Rock
14	Orion	X Ambassadors	Alternative rock; indie rock; pop rock
15	The Orwells	The Orwells	Punk rock; indie rock
19	The ReVe Festival: Day 1	Red Velvet	K-pop
21	Blood	Collective Soul	Alternative; rock
21	From Another World	Jim Lauderdale	Country; blues; bluegrass
21	7	Lil Nas X	Hip hop
21	Help Us Stranger	The Raconteurs	Alternative rock; rock
21	Snowball Out of Hell	The Smoking Flowers	Rock; Americana
28	Let's Rock	The Black Keys	Garage rock; blues rock
28	Indigo	Chris Brown	R&B; soul
28	Inspirations and Dedications	Al Foster	Jazz
28	Stranger Songs	Ingrid Michaelson	Alternative; pop
28	Local Motion	Pepper	Alternative rock; ska

=== July ===
Date	Album	Artist	Genre (s)
5	Metawar	3Teeth	Industrial; industrial metal
5	Stonechild	Jesca Hoop	Folk; blues; pop
5	Hotel Diablo	Machine Gun Kelly	Hip hop
5	FLYGOD is an Awesome GOD	Westside Gunn	Hip hop
12	Voyager	311	Alternative rock; reggae rock; rap rock
12	III	Banks	Gothic pop
12	Don't You Think You've Had Enough?	Bleached	Punk rock; pop punk
12	Shadows	Cannons	Indie pop; pop rock
12	Daydream Explosion	The Dollyrots	Punk rock
12	Modern Mirror	Drab Majesty	Post-punk; new wave
12	Controlled Burn Live in Atlanta	Gringo Star	Indie rock
12	Solutions	K.Flay	Alternative rock; rap rock; alternative hip hop
19	Singular: Act II	Sabrina Carpenter	Pop; dance
19	King's Mouth	The Flaming Lips	Alternative rock
19	Brand New Day	Eddie Money	Rock; pop rock
19	The Lost Tapes II	Nas	Hip hop
19	The Space Between the Shadows	Scott Stapp	Rock
26	The Big Day	Chance the Rapper	Hip hop
26	Navie	Andy Grammer	Pop
26	happysad	Meg & Dia	Indie rock; pop rock
26	Guy Walks Into A Bar	Mini Mansions	Glam rock; indie pop
26	The Search	NF	Hip hop
26	New State of Mind	Night Riots	Pop rock
26	Little Yachty	Sugar Ray	Rock; yacht rock
26	Hotel Last Resort	Violent Femmes	Alternative rock
26	The Lost Boy	YBN Cordae	Hip hop

=== August ===
Date	Album	Artist	Genre (s)
2	Finding God Before God Finds Me	Bad Omens	Metalcore; nu metal
2	Interpreting the Masters Volume 2: A Tribute to Van Halen	The Bird and the Bee	Indie pop
2	Country Squire	Tyler Childers	Country
2	Immunity	Clairo	Pop; indie rock
2	Gemini	Diana DeGarmo	Country; pop
2	Sweet Shivers	The Rocket Summer	Pop rock
2	First Taste	Ty Segall	Garage rock; indie rock
2	Victorious	Skillet	Hard rock; alternative rock
9	Mixtape Vol 1	Jesse Dayton	Country; rock
9	Super Moon	Dirty Heads	Alternative hip hop; reggae rock
9	Inspired By True Events	Tori Kelly	Pop
9	Superbloom	Ra Ra Riot	Indie rock
9	How Do You Love?	The Regrettes	Punk rock
9	We Are Not Your Kind	Slipknot	Hard rock; heavy metal
9	Songs of Amor and Devotion	Strung Out	Rock
16	Dragons	Drew Holcomb and The Neighbors	Americana
16	Wild Blue (Part I)	Hunter Hayes	Country pop; pop rock; R&B
16	Ascend	Illenium	Electronic
16	Basking in the Glow	Oso Oso	Emo; pop punk; indie rock
16	Dark Hour	The Parlor Mob	Rock; hard rock
16	The Center Won't Hold	Sleater-Kinney	Rock; punk rock; indie rock
16	Goin 50 (box set)	ZZ Top	Southern rock; pop; rock
20	The Reve Festival: Day 2	Red Velvet	K-pop
23	Okie	Vince Gill	Country
23	Let It Roll	Midland	Country
23	Live From Las Vegas	Lionel Richie	Pop; soul
23	From Home	The Rubinoos	Power pop; pop
23	Lover	Taylor Swift	Electropop; pop rock; synth-pop
23	While I'm Livin'	Tanya Tucker	Country
30	I, I	Bon Iver	Art pop; indie folk; folktronica
30	Threads	Sheryl Crow	Pop; country
30	Sleeping Giants (reissue)	David Ellefson	Hard rock; heavy metal
30	Fear Inoculum	Tool	Alternative metal; progressive metal
30	Pressure	Wage War	Metalcore
30	Every Girl	Trisha Yearwood	Country

=== September ===
Date	Album	Artist	Genre (s)
6	Another State of Grace	Black Star Riders	Hard rock; heavy metal
6	Close it Quietly	Frankie Cosmos	Rock; folk rock
6	You Don't Know Me: Classic Country	Crystal Gayle	Country; covers
6	Valve Bone Woe	Chrissie Hynde	Rock; new wave; punk rock
6	Free	Iggy Pop	Ambient; jazz
6	K-12	Melanie Martinez	Indie pop; pop
6	Hollywood's Bleeding	Post Malone	Alternative rock
6	How It Feels to Be Lost	Sleeping with Sirens	Rock
13	The Things We Can't Stop	Cold	Hard rock; heavy metal
13	The Fall of Hobo Johnson	Hobo Johnson	Hip hop; alternative hip hop
13	The Nothing	Korn	Nu metal; alternative metal
13	III	The Lumineers	Folk rock; indie folk
13	Beneath the Eyrie	Pixies	Indie rock; alternative rock
13	Welcome to Galvania	Puddle of Mudd	Alternative metal
13	Pride and Disaster	Sleep On It	Pop punk; punk rock
13	breathe	Tiny Moving Parts	Midwest emo
20	Nine	Blink-182	Pop punk; alternative rock
20	Chastity Belt	Chastity Belt	Indie rock; noise pop
20	All the Feels	Fitz and the Tantrums	Indie pop; neo soul
20	Jamie	Brittany Howard	Americana; blues rock; garage rock
20	The Quebe Sisters	The Quebe Sisters	Country; Americana
20	The Owl	Zac Brown Band	Country
21	Spirit Counsel	Thurston Moore	Avant-garde; rock
26	Mirrors	Nivea	R&B
27	For The Girls	Kristin Chenoweth	Pop; jazz
27	Lilac	The Early November	Alternative rock; emo
27	War In My Mind	Beth Hart	Rock; pop
27	Welcome Home	Hellyeah	Hard rock; heavy metal
27	Wire Mountain	Will Johnson	Indie rock; alt-country
27	The Circle Is Round	Magnapop	Power pop
27	Earthandsky	Of Mice & Men	Metalcore; hard rock
27	Heartache Medication	Jon Pardi	Country
27	Dead Man's Pop (box set)	The Replacements	Alternative rock
27	Wavelengths	Vacationer	Instrumental

=== October ===
Date	Album	Artist	Genre (s)
4	Casualty	Anna Akana	Pop
4	El Negreeto	Akon	Reggaeton; bachata; merengue
4	Closer Than Together	The Avett Brothers	Folk rock
4	Interrobang	Bayside	Pop punk
4	Deceiver	DIIV	Indie rock
4	Hello Exile	The Menzingers	Punk rock
4	Up And Rolling	North Mississippi Allstars	Southern rock; blues
4	All Mirrors	Angel Olsen	Indie folk; indie rock
4	Old LP	that dog.	Alternative rock; punk rock
4	Ode to Joy	Wilco	Indie rock; alternative rock
11	Sun Songs	Art Alexakis	Rock
11	Two Hands	Big Thief	Indie rock
11	The Act	The Devil Wears Prada	Heavy metal; hard rock
11	Plunge and Surface	Goldroom	Electronic; electropop
11	Almost Daylight	Chris Knight	Rock; indie rock; country rock
11	Somebody's Knocking	Mark Lanegan	Alternative rock; folk rock
11	Devour You	Starcrawler	Rock
18	Fear Caller	The Almost	Alternative rock
18	Walk The Sky	Alter Bridge	Hard rock; rock
18	There Existed an Addiction To Blood	Clipping	Hip hop
18	Kin	Electric Guest	Indie pop; electronic rock
18	The Help Machine	Fastball	Alternative rock; pop rock
18	Angels with Tattoos	Skylar Grey	Rock; Pop
18	Surviving	Jimmy Eat World	Alternative rock
18	Panic Attack	Lionize	Hard rock; heavy metal
18	Pang	Caroline Polachek	Indie rock; indie pop; electronic
18	The Decalogue	Sufjan Stevens	Indie rock; indie folk
18	Screamer	Third Eye Blind	Alternative rock
18	You Deserve Love	White Reaper	Garage rock; garage punk
25	Bigger Than Life	Black Marble	Dance; synth-pop
25	Cry	Cigarettes After Sex	Rock; pop
25	Sweating the Plague	Guided By Voices	Lo-fi; alternative rock; indie rock
25	Cheap Queen	King Princess	Pop rock; indie pop
25	All Hail	Norma Jean	Hard rock; heavy metal
25	Old Dominion	Old Dominion	Country
25	Daylight	Grace Potter	Rock; pop
30	Supermoon (EP)	Charly Bliss	Punk rock; indie rock; alternative rock
31	Ghetto Cowboy	Yelawolf	Hip hop

=== November ===
Date	Album	Artist	Genre (s)
1	The Legacy Collection (Reissue)	Garth Brooks	Country
1	New Age Norms	Cold War Kids	Alternative rock; indie rock
1	MCID	Highly Suspect	Alternative rock; rock
1	Imperfect Circle	Hootie & the Blowfish	Rock
1	Wildcard	Miranda Lambert	Country
8	Get Loud!	Agnostic Front	Hardcore punk
8	What You See is What You Get	Luke Combs	Country
8	The Trophy	Kate Davis	Jazz; pop
8	Hollywood Cowboys	Quiet Riot	Hard rock; heavy metal
8	Building Balance	Allen Stone	Soul; pop
15	Dead: The Album	Breathe Carolina	EDM; electropop
15	Believers Never Die – Greatest Hits Vol. 2	Fall Out Boy	Rock; pop
15	What Would The Odd Do	Guerilla Toss	Art rock; noise rock; punk rock; new wave
15	Juliana Hatfield Sings The Police	Juliana Hatfield	Rock; pop
15	Ocean	Lady Antebellum	Country
15	December, Darling	Meg & Dia	Christmas
22	9	Jason Aldean	Country
22	Hyperspace	Beck	Alternative rock; pop; folk
22	Cotillions	William Patrick Corgan	Americana
22	Lost And Found	Harry Nilsson	Rock; pop
22	To Be One with You	Pluralone	Alternative rock
22	Come On Up To The House	Various Artists	Rock; pop
22	Speed	Keller Williams	Folk; reggae; bluegrass
29	Death Atlas	Cattle Decapitation	Death metal; metalcore; heavy metal
29	Winter Stories	Judy Collins	Folk; country; pop
29	Dr. Feelgood (Reissue)	Mötley Crüe	Hard rock; heavy metal
29	Sickness Divine	The Red Death	Hard rock; Heavy Metal

=== December ===
Date	Album	Artist	Genre (s)
6	Live At The Rebel Lounge	Authority Zero	Rock; pop
6	Romance	Camila Cabello	Pop; Latin; Rock
6	Only The Song Survives	John Hiatt	Heartland rock; blues rock; folk rock
6	The Blackest Crow	Anna Nalick	Pop; rock
6	The Decalogue (CD)	Sufjan Stevens	Indie folk; indie rock
12	Whenever	Atmosphere	Hip hop
13	Year One Demos	American Football	Rock; pop
13	32 Thousand Days	Emerson Hart	Alternative rock; rock
13	Fine Line	Harry Styles	Pop rock; Psychedelic rock
13	The Gamblers Last Deal	Kenny Rogers	Country
13	Fully Loaded God's Country	Blake Shelton	Country
20	Circumstance Sythnesis	Julianna Barwick	Ambient; new age
20	The Complete Atlantic Albums	Solomon Burke	Blues; soul; gospel
20	Hot Rats (50th Anninversary Reissue)	Frank Zappa	Rock; pop
27	JackBoys	Travis Scott	R&B; hip hop
27	Jesus is Born	Kanye West	Christian hip hop; gospel

== Top songs on record ==
=== Billboard Hot 100 No. 1 Songs ===
- "7 Rings" – Ariana Grande (8 weeks)
- "All I Want for Christmas Is You" – Mariah Carey (2 weeks)
- "Bad Guy" – Billie Eilish (1 week)
- "Circles" – Post Malone (2 weeks)
- "Heartless" – The Weeknd (1 week)
- "Highest in the Room" – Travis Scott (1 week)
- "Lose You to Love Me" – Selena Gomez (1 week)
- "Old Town Road" – Lil Nas X feat. Billy Ray Cyrus (19 weeks)
- "Señorita" – Shawn Mendes and Camila Cabello (1 week)
- "Shallow" – Lady Gaga and Bradley Cooper (1 week)
- "Someone You Loved" – Lewis Capaldi (3 weeks)
- "Sucker" – Jonas Brothers (1 week)
- "Sunflower" – Post Malone and Swae Lee (1 week)
- "Thank U, Next" – Ariana Grande (6 weeks in 2018, 1 week in 2019)
- "Truth Hurts" – Lizzo (7 weeks)
- "Without Me" – Halsey (2 weeks)

=== Billboard Hot 100 Top 20 Hits ===
All songs that reached the Top 20 on the Billboard Hot 100 chart during the year, complete with peak chart placement.

- "10,000 Hours" – Dan + Shay and Justin Bieber (#4)
- "7 Rings" – Ariana Grande (#1)
- "A Holly Jolly Christmas" – Burl Ives (#6)
- "A Lot" – 21 Savage (#12)
- "All I Want for Christmas Is You" − Mariah Carey (#1)
- "Bad Guy" – Billie Eilish (#1)
- "Ballin'" – Mustard feat. Roddy Ricch (#14)
- "Bandit" – Juice WRLD and YoungBoy Never Broke Again (#10)
- "Beautiful People" – Ed Sheeran feat. Khalid (#13)
- "Better" – Khalid (#8)
- "Better Now" – Post Malone (#3 in 2018, #10 in 2019)
- "Blinding Lights" – The Weeknd (#11)
- "Bop" – DaBaby (#11)
- "Boy with Luv" – BTS feat. Halsey (#8)
- "Boyfriend" – Ariana Grande and Social House (#8)
- "Break Up with Your Girlfriend, I'm Bored" – Ariana Grande (#2)
- "Breathin" – Ariana Grande (#12 in 2018, #15 in 2019)
- "Bury a Friend" – Billie Eilish (#14)
- "Circles" – Post Malone (#1)
- "Closed on Sunday" – Kanye West (#17)
- "Dance Monkey" – Tones and I (#9)
- "Dancing with a Stranger" – Sam Smith and Normani (#7)
- "Die for Me" – Post Malone feat. Future and Halsey (#20)
- "Don't Call Me Angel" − Ariana Grande, Miley Cyrus and Lana Del Rey (#13)
- "Don't Start Now" – Dua Lipa (#2)
- "Drip Too Hard" − Lil Baby and Gunna (#4 in 2018, #8 in 2019)
- "Earfquake" – Tyler, the Creator (#13)
- "Earth" – Lil Dicky (#17)
- "Eastside" – Benny Blanco, Halsey and Khalid (#9)
- "Enemies" – Post Malone feat. DaBaby (#16)
- "Even Though I'm Leaving" – Luke Combs (#11)
- "Everything I Wanted" – Billie Eilish (#8)
- "Follow God" – Kanye West (#7)
- "Futsal Shuffle 2020" – Lil Uzi Vert (#5)
- "Girls Like You" − Maroon 5 feat. Cardi B (#1 in 2018, #7 in 2019)
- "God's Country" – Blake Shelton (#17)
- "Going Bad" – Meek Mill feat. Drake (#6 in 2018, #10 in 2019)
- "Good as Hell" – Lizzo (#3)
- "Goodbyes" – Post Malone feat. Young Thug (#3)
- "Happier" – Marshmello and Bastille (#2)
- "Heartless" – The Weeknd (#1)
- "Hey Look Ma, I Made It" – Panic! at the Disco (#16)
- "High Hopes" – Panic! at the Disco (#4)
- "Highest in the Room" – Travis Scott (#1)
- "Hollywood's Bleeding" – Post Malone (#15)
- "Homicide" – Logic feat. Eminem (#5)
- "Hot" – Young Thug feat. Gunna (#11)
- "Hot Girl Summer" – Megan Thee Stallion feat. Nicki Minaj and Ty Dolla Sign (#11)
- "I Don't Care" – Ed Sheeran and Justin Bieber (#2)
- "If I Can't Have You" – Shawn Mendes (#2)
- "Intro" – DaBaby (#13)
- "It's the Most Wonderful Time of the Year" − Andy Williams (#10 in 2018, #13 in 2019)
- "Jingle Bell Rock" – Bobby Helms (#8)
- "Last Christmas" – Wham! (#17)
- "Leave Me Alone" – Flipp Dinero (#20)
- "Let It Snow, Let It Snow, Let It Snow" − Dean Martin (#20)
- "Lights Up" – Harry Styles (#17)
- "Lose You to Love Me" – Selena Gomez (#1)
- "Lover" – Taylor Swift (#10)
- "Lucid Dreams" – Juice WRLD (#2 in 2018, #8 in 2019)
- "Me!" – Taylor Swift feat. Brendon Urie (#2)
- "Megatron" – Nicki Minaj (#20)
- "Memories" – Maroon 5 (#4)
- "Mia" – Bad Bunny feat. Drake (#5 in 2018, #19 in 2019)
- "Middle Child" – J. Cole (#4)
- "Mo Bamba" − Sheck Wes (#6 in 2018, #14 in 2019)
- "Money" − Cardi B (#13)
- "Money in the Grave" – Drake feat. Rick Ross (#7)
- "Murder on My Mind" − YNW Melly (#14)
- "NASA" – Ariana Grande (#17)
- "Needy" – Ariana Grande (#14)
- "Never Really Over" – Katy Perry (#15)
- "Nightmare" – Halsey (#15)
- "No Guidance" – Chris Brown feat. Drake (#5)
- "Old Town Road" – Lil Nas X feat. Billy Ray Cyrus (#1)
- "One Man Band" – Old Dominion (#20)
- "Only Human" – Jonas Brothers (#18)
- "Panini" – Lil Nas X (#5)
- "Playing Games" – Summer Walker (#16)
- "Please Me" – Cardi B and Bruno Mars (#3)
- "Pop Out" – Polo G feat. Lil Tjay (#11)
- "Press" – Cardi B (#16)
- "Ransom" – Lil Tecca (#4)
- "Rockin' Around the Christmas Tree" – Brenda Lee (#2)
- "Roxanne" – Arizona Zervas (#4)
- "Rudolph the Red-Nosed Reindeer" − Gene Autry (#16)
- "Saint-Tropez" – Post Malone (#18)
- "Selah" – Kanye West (#19)
- "Señorita" – Shawn Mendes and Camila Cabello (#1)
- "Shallow" − Lady Gaga and Bradley Cooper (#1)
- "Sicko Mode" – Travis Scott (#1 in 2018, #3 in 2019)
- "Someone You Loved" – Lewis Capaldi (#1)
- "Sucker" – Jonas Brothers (#1)
- "Suge" – DaBaby (#7)
- "Sunflower" – Post Malone and Swae Lee (#1)
- "Sweet but Psycho" – Ava Max (#10)
- "Take What You Want" – Post Malone feat. Ozzy Osbourne and Travis Scott (#8)
- "Taki Taki" – DJ Snake feat. Selena Gomez, Ozuna and Cardi B (#11 in 2018, #18 in 2019)
- "Talk" – Khalid (#3)
- "Thank U, Next" – Ariana Grande (#1)
- "The Box" – Roddy Ricch (#18)
- "The Christmas Song (Merry Christmas to You)" − Nat King Cole (#11)
- "The Git Up" – Blanco Brown (#14)
- "The London" – Young Thug, J. Cole and Travis Scott (#12)
- "Thotiana" – Blueface (#8)
- "Trampoline" – Shaed (#13)
- "Truth Hurts" – Lizzo (#1)
- "Wake Up in the Sky" − Gucci Mane, Bruno Mars and Kodak Black (#11 in 2018, #12 in 2019)
- "Whiskey Glasses" – Morgan Wallen (#17)
- "Wish Wish" − DJ Khaled feat. Cardi B and 21 Savage (#19)
- "Without Me" – Halsey (#1)
- "Woah" – Lil Baby (#16)
- "Wow." – Post Malone (#2)
- "You Need to Calm Down" – Taylor Swift (#2)
- "Youngblood" – 5 Seconds of Summer (#7 in 2018, #14 in 2019)
- "Zeze" − Kodak Black feat. Travis Scott and Offset (#2 in 2018, #9 in 2019)

== Deaths ==
- January 1 –
  - Shane Bisnett, 31, metalcore bassist (Ice Nine Kills)
  - Pegi Young, 66, musician, activist
- January 2 – Daryl Dragon, 76, musician, songwriter, keyboardist (Captain & Tennille)
- January 3 – Steve Ripley, 69, singer songwriter (The Tractors)
- January 5 – Alvin Fielder, 83, jazz drummer
- January 7 – Clydie King, 75, pop and rock singer
- January 9 – Joseph Jarman, 81, jazz saxophonist
- January 10 – Larry Cunningham, 67, R&B singer
- January 12 – Sanger D. Shafer, 84, country singer, songwriter
- January 13
  - Bonnie Guitar, 95, country singer
  - David "Frenchy" O'Brien, 71, pop drummer (Animotion)
- January 16 – Lorna Doom, 61, punk rock bassist
- January 17 – Reggie Young, 82, country and rock guitarist, session musician
- January 21 –
  - Kaye Ballard, 93, musical theatre actress, comedian
  - Edwin Birdsong, 77, funk keyboardist
  - Maxine Brown, 87, country singer
- January 25 – Jacqueline Steiner, 94, folk singer, songwriter
- January 26 – Bruce Corbitt, 56, heavy metal vocalist
- January 28 – Paul Whaley, 72, rock drummer
- January 29 – James Ingram, 66, R&B singer
- January 31 – Harold Bradley, 93, country guitarist
- February 2 – Alex Brown, 52, rock guitarist (Gorilla Biscuits)
- February 3 – Tim Landers, 62, vocalist and singer
- February 11 – Harvey Scales, 78, R&B soul singer and songwriter
- February 15 – Kofi Burbridge, 57, keyboardist and flautist
- February 16 – Ken Nordine, 98, spoken word jazz
- February 17 – Ethel Ennis, 86, jazz musician
- February 19 – Artie Wayne, 77, pop singer, producer
- February 20 – Dominick Argento, 91, composer
- February 21 –
  - Peter Tork, 77, musician (The Monkees)
  - Gus Backus, 81, doo-wop singer
  - Jackie Shane, 78, soul singer
- February 24 – Mac Wiseman, 93, bluegrass musician
- March 1 – Stephan Ellis, 69, rock bassist (Survivor)
- March 2 – Al Hazan, 84, pianist (B. Bumble and the Stingers), songwriter and record producer
- March 4 – Mike Walker, 50, rock drummer (Aranda)
- March 5 – Sara Romweber, 55, drummer for Let's Active, Snatches of Pink and Dex Romweber Duo
- March 6 – James Dapogny, 78, jazz pianist
- March 8 – Eddie Taylor Jr., 46, blues singer and guitarist
- March 10 – Asa Brebner, 65, singer-songwriter and guitarist
- March 11 – Hal Blaine, 90, rock and pop drummer
- March 12 – John Kilzer, 62, singer and songwriter
- March 16 –
  - Dick Dale, 81, surf rock guitarist
  - David White, 79, doo-wop and rock and roll singer (Danny & the Juniors)
- March 17 – Andre Williams, 82, R&B singer
- March 21 – Doris Duke, 77, gospel and soul singer
- March 25 – Scott Walker, 76, experimental pop singer (The Walker Brothers)
- March 28 – Maury Laws, 95, composer
- March 31 – Nipsey Hussle, 33, rapper
- April 2 –
- April 3 – Shawn Smith, 53, singer and songwriter
  - Rick Elias, Christian singer and songwriter
  - Kim English, 48, house singer and Christian singer
- April 4 – Tiger Merrit, 31, rock singer and guitarist
- April 5 – Davey Williams, 66, Avant-Garde and jazz guitarist
- April 6 – Jim Glaser, 81, country singer
- April 10 – Earl Thomas Conley, 77, country singer
- April 15 – Joe Terry, 78, doo-wop and rock and roll (Danny & the Juniors)
- April 18 – Eddie Tinger, 92, blues singer and keyboardist
- April 22 – Dave Samuels, 70, jazz musician
- April 26 – Phil McCormack, 58, southern rock singer (Molly Hatchet)
- May 2 – John Starling, 79, bluegrass singer and songwriter (The Seldom Scene)
- May 4 – J.R. Cobb, 75, guitarist and songwriter
- May 9 – Preston Epps, 88, percussionist
- May 11 –
  - Peggy Lipton, 72, singer and actress
  - Sol Yaged, 96, jazz clarinetist
- May 13 – Doris Day, 97, singer and actress
- May 14 –
  - Leon Rausch, 91, Country singer
  - Mike Wilhelm, 77, rock guitarist
- May 15
  - Chuck Barksdale, 84, R&B singer, bass singer and founding member of The Dells.
  - Huelyn Duvall, 79, rockabilly singer and guitarist
- May 17 – Eric Moore, 67, hard rock singer and bassist
- May 28 – John Gary Williams, 73, R&B singer
- May 29 –
  - Tony Glover, 79, blues singer and harmonica player
  - Jeff Walls, 62, guitarist and songwriter
- May 30 – Leon Redbone, 69, jazz and ragtime singer, guitarist
- May 31 – Roky Erickson, 71, psychedelic rock singer and songwriter
- June 4 – Mikey Dees, TBD, punk rock singer and guitarist (Fitz of Depression)
- June 5 – Brian Doherty, 51, guitarist (Big Wreck)
- June 6 – Dr. John, 77, blues, jazz, boogie-woogie, and rock singer, songwriter
- June 9 –
  - Bushwick Bill, 52, rapper (Geto Boys)
  - Jim Pike, 82, pop singer (The Lettermen)
- June 10 –
  - Chuck Glaser, 83, country singer (Tompall & the Glaser Brothers)
  - Lil' Buck Sinegal, 75 blues singer
- June 16 – Bishop Bullwinkle, 70, soul singer
- June 19 – Etika, 29, youtuber and rapper
- June 23 – David Bartholomew, 100, composer and bandleader
- June 24 – Jeff Austin, 45, bluegrass singer
- June 29 – Gary Duncan, 72, rock guitarist
- July 1 – Sid Ramin, 100, composer and arranger
- July 9 – Aaron Rosand, 92, classical violinist
- July 10 – Jerry Lawson, 75, a cappella singer
- July 12 –
  - Dick Richards, 95, rock and roll drummer
  - Russell Smith, 70, country rock singer
- July 16 – Bill Vitt, rock drummer
- July 18 – Bob Frank, 75, singer, songwriter
- July 21 – Ben Johnston, 93, microtonal composer
- July 22 – Art Neville, 81, funk singer, keyboardist
- July 29 – Ras G, 39, hip hop producer
- August 5 – Lizzie Grey, 60, glam metal guitarist
- August 7
  - David Berman, 52, indie rock songer songwriter
  - Francesca Sundsten, 58, post punk bassist
  - Nicky Wonder, 59, power pop guitarist
- August 11 – Jim Cullum Jr., 77, jazz cornetist
- August 19 – Larry Taylor, 77, bass guitarist
- August 27
  - Neal Casal, 50, rock guitarist
  - Donnie Fritts, 76, country keyboardist and songwriter
- August 28 – Nancy Holloway, 86, jazz and pop singer
- August 29 – Jimmy Pitman, 72, rock singer, songwriter and guitarist (Strawberry Alarm Clock)
- September 5 – Jimmy Johnson, 76, rock and soul guitarist
- September 10 –
  - Jeff Fenholt, 68, rock and Christian singer
  - Danny Johnston, 58, folk singer and songwriter
- September 13 – Eddie Money, 70, singer, songwriter, multi-instrumentalist
- September 15 – Ric Ocasek, 75, singer, songwriter, record producer (The Cars)
- September 16 –
  - John Cohen, 87, folk banjoist and guitarist
  - Mick Shauer, 47, stoner rock keyboardist
- September 19
  - Harold Mabern, 83, jazz pianist
  - Yonrico Scott, 63, rock and blues drummer
- September 24 – Robert Hunter, 78, rock lyricist and multi-instrumentalist
- September 26 – Jimmy Spicer, 61, rapper
- September 29 – Busbee, 43, songwriter and producer
- September 30 – Jessye Norman, 74, opera soprano singer
- October 1 – Beverly Watkins, 80, blues guitarist
- October 2 – Kim Shattuck, 56, singer-songwriter and guitarist (The Muffs, The Pandoras)
- October 3 – Vinnie Bell, 87, session guitarist
- October 4 – Ed Ackerson, 54, alternative rock singer and guitarist (Polara)
- October 5 – Larry Junstrom, 70, southern rock bassist (38 Special, Lynyrd Skynyrd)
- October 12 –
  - George Chambers, 88, singer and bassist (The Chambers Brothers)
  - Kenny Dixon, 27, country music drummer
- October 14 – Steve Cash, 73, southern rock singer
- October 17 – Ray Santos, 90, Latin pop saxophonist
- October 25 – Joe Sun, 76, country singer
- October 26 – Paul Barrere, 71, southern rock guitarist
- October 31 – Kendra Malia, 37, witch house singer
- November 11 – Bad Azz, 43, rapper
- November 20 – Doug Lubahn, 71, psychedelic rock and jazz rock bassist (Clear Light)
- November 21
  - Donna Carson, 73, folk singer (Hedge and Donna)
  - Farris Lanier Jr., 70, R&B-soul-funk singer (Lanier & Co.)
- November 29 – Irving Burgie, 95, musician and songwriter
- December 2 – Jimmy Cavallo, 92, rock and roll singer
- December 5 – Jerry Naylor, 80, rock and roll musician (The Crickets)
- December 7 –
  - Herb Cox, 81, doo-wop singer and songwriter (The Cleftones)
  - Joe McQueen, 100, jazz saxophonist
- December 8 – Juice WRLD, 21, rapper, singer, songwriter
- December 13 –
  - Emil Richards, 87, classical and jazz vibraphonist
  - Roy Loney, 73, garage rock singer and guitarist (Flamin' Groovies)
- December 14 – Irv Williams, 100, jazz saxophonist
- December 18 – Abbey Simon, 99, classical pianist
- December 24 –
  - Dave Riley, 59, punk rock bassist
  - Allee Willis, 72, pop and funk songwriter
- December 26 – Sleepy LaBeef, 84, rockabilly singer and guitarist
- December 29 – Norma Tanega, 80, folk singer-songwriter

== See also ==
- 2010s in music
