= Patrick Dennis (musician) =

American singer-songwriter

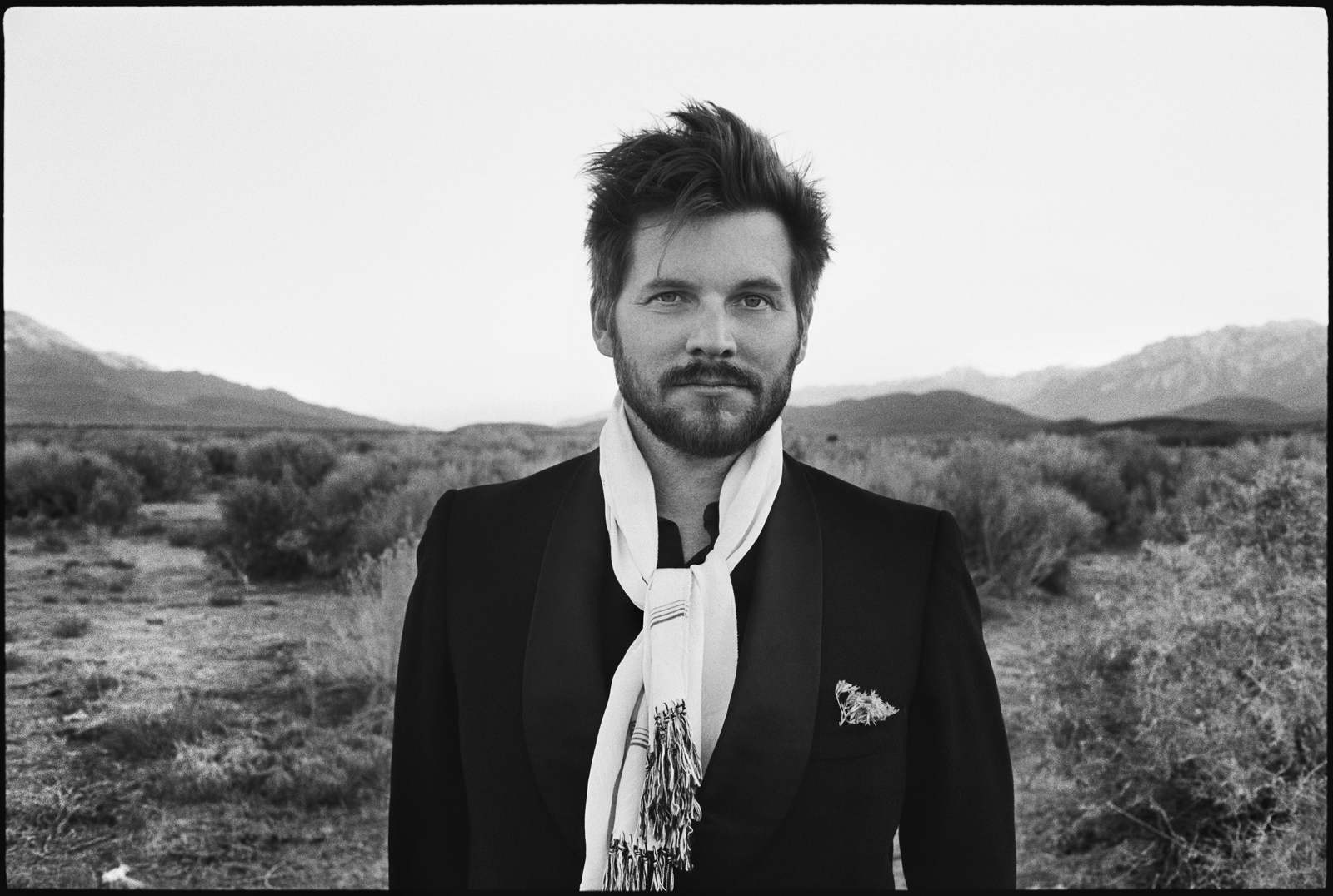

Background information
- Also known as: Peat Truckee, Byron Nashe
- Born: Patrick Michael Dennis; Las Palmas, Gran Canaria, Spain
- Origin: Los Angeles, California, U.S.
- Genres: Alternative rock, indie rock, alternative country, folk rock, punk rock, Americana
- Occupations: Musician, songwriter
- Instruments: Vocals, guitar, drums, keyboards, harmonica, mandolin
- Years active: 1995–present
- Labels: Cargo Music, Populuxe Records, Redeye Distribution, Capitol Records, Summertone, Wharfechild,
- Website: patrickdennis.com

Patrick Dennis is an American indie rock musician and visual artist from San Diego, California, and former member of the bands Truckee Brothers and Wirepony. His debut solo album, ‘Fürst In The Dirt’, was released on June 19, 2015.

== Early life ==
Patrick Dennis was born in Las Palmas, Spain and raised in England before moving with his family to Encinitas, California. His great-grandfather taught him cowboy songs and his mother taught him American folk songs as a little boy. His father's record collection greatly affected him when he was young including The Ramsey Lewis Trio, The Beatles’ Sgt. Pepper's Lonely Hearts Club Band, and The Moody Blues' On the Threshold of a Dream. He began playing drums as a teenager forming his first band, Carnival, in high school inspired by The Replacements, The Clash, and Iggy Pop.

== Career ==
After High School Patrick moved to the UK playing in bands and studying painting at college in Manchester before returning to San Diego and forming the duo The Homer Gunns with Frank Lee Drennen of Dead Rock West. Soon after forming the band they met Dave Sharp of the Welsh band The Alarm who became their mentor, rehearsing them, reinforcing their love of American folk music with his own passion for Woody Guthrie and Bob Dylan and taking them on tour as his backing band.

=== Byron Nashe ===
After the breakup of the Homer Gunns Patrick recorded a cassette demo under the name Byron Nashe, a nickname given to him by Dave Sharp, which was produced by San Diego musician Gregory Page. The demo was heard by the indie punk label Cargo Music who signed him to a recording contract with their new Earth Music label. His album for Earth Music, ‘Spun’, was produced by Clayton Cages and featured John Cowsill of The Cowsills on drums but was shelved by the label soon before Cargo closed their San Diego office and was never released. It was intended to be the first Patrick Dennis solo album.

=== Truckee Brothers ===
In 2004, Patrick and Christopher Hoffee formed the Truckee Brothers while producing a record for Lisa Sanders. After being asked to play a local festival they wrote and recorded their debut EP, Wall to Wall, in just a few days calling themselves Peat and Cady Truckee. They played all of the instruments and produced the EP themselves with no intention to form a band considering it a "one-off". Disc jockey Tim Pyles at 91X XETRA-FM began playing "Death Vulcan Grip" on air and the band launched their own label, Populuxe Records to release the EP. The resulting buzz garnered them a performance at SXSW that year followed by a UK tour in 2006.

They wrote and recorded four albums together, along with drummer Matt Lynott of The White Buffalo and after a few lineup changes, bassist Greg Friedman with Patrick and Christopher producing all four albums themselves. After a 2010 US tour in support of their album Double Happiness, the band seemed to disappear, Patrick admitting during a Wirepony radio interview on San Diego's 94/9 KBZT the following year that the band had ended. They reformed for two shows in the winter of 2014 in San Diego at the request of Steve Poltz and Casbah owner Tim Mays to help celebrate the Casbah's 25th anniversary which had been their home club in San Diego. A matinee show was added when the first show sold out in days. Michael Halloran of 91X who was broadcasting live from the matinee show announced that the band were recording the performances, but no recordings have been released.

In 2012, Double Happiness was featured in The Music Obsessive's Guide to Life, Vol. 1 as one of "350 of the most important albums in music history".

== Solo ==
=== Post Wirepony ===
In July 2012, it was announced on Wirepony's Facebook page that Patrick was recording a new record in Nashville with production duo Cosmic Thug who had produced records by Deer Tick and Diamond Rugs and the Wirepony website was redirected to a new patrickdennis.com website. In November 2012 a film clip featuring studio footage of Patrick, Cosmic Thug's Adam Landry and Justin Collins and Truckee Brothers bandmate Matt Lynott was posted to YouTube including part of a new song, 'Picking Up The Silver’ stating that a new album would be released in 2013. Completing the album was delayed when Patrick broke his hand requiring surgery and months of recovery.

In the Autumn of 2014, Patrick and his partner Cindy Wasserman took part in recording at Abbey Road writing and singing a verse for the song 'The Scriptures' written and produced by Mike Peters from the Welsh band The Alarm. It was released in partnership with Mike Peters’ Love Hope Strength Foundation in aid of the Unrelated Marrow Donor Registry of Hadassah charity, a blood cancer treatment facility dedicated to the people of the Middle East. It was later certified by Guinness Book Of World Records as the world's longest song.

=== Fürst In The Dirt ===
In the Spring of 2015, it was announced that Patrick's debut solo album was completed and to be called ‘Fürst In The Dirt’. It was released on June 19, 2015, on his own Los Angeles–based record label Wharfechild Recording Co produced by Cosmic Thug at Adam Landry's Playground Sound studio in Nashville, Tennessee. The album was recorded to 8-track tape which was a format that Patrick hadn't worked with in over a decade and he called "very very liberating".

The record was inspired by a conversation that he had with the painter Carlos Estrada Vega in Las Cruces, New Mexico and by meeting Justin Collins and Adam Landry of Cosmic Thug soon after he moved to Nashville, Tennessee. The songs he said were a result of the "excitement at just still being here, alive and loving life, surrounded by talented friends making noise again" with "no agenda or expectation to have anyone even hear these songs". He has stated that Kevin Ayers of The Soft Machine inspired the track ‘Burn And Shine’. Patrick co-wrote the lyric for the song ‘Kissing The Beast’ with Justin Collins who also appears on the track and in the video for ‘Kissing The Beast’ which was shot in the East Nashville basement of Scott and Kim Collins of The Smoking Flowers and filmed by Patrick and Kim using Super8 cameras to make the video "as ragged and spontaneous as when the song was recorded".

In June 2015, Patrick played his first shows featuring the songs from the album supporting John Doe. Patrick's new band featured Andrew McKeag of Presidents of the United States on guitar.

== Writing style ==
Patrick's music has been inspired by a wide variety of artists and styles, including Hüsker Dü, The Replacements, David Bowie, The Waterboys, and Willie Nelson. Folk elements are as much present as punk partially coming from Patrick's time playing with Dave Sharp whose dedication to both Joe Strummer and Woody Guthrie's legacy heavily influenced Patrick's earlier band, The Homer Gunns. The Truckee Brothers were heavily influenced by Frank Zappa and Cheap Trick calling themselves the ‘Evil Everly Brothers’. He also states that writers Column McCann and Jim Harrison and the poets Federico Garcia Lorca, William Blake and Robert Graves have influenced his writing. The Truckee Brothers song ‘Walk Thru The Fire’ was inspired by Henry Bukowski's collection ‘What Matters Most Is How You Walk Through The Fire’.

== Visual art ==
Patrick was an artist's apprentice studying print making and painting and has acted as Art Director on projects including the 2010 and 2011 marketing campaigns for Electra Bicycle Company working with founder, Benno Baenziger and photographer Art Brewer both years. Patrick directed the promotional film for the 2010 Electra campaign with music contributed by Pall Jenkins’ Mr Tube And The Flying Objects. He also directed the visuals for albums by Oxford Mississippi band Blue Mountain’s Midnight In Mississippi, Cindy Lee Berryhill’s ‘Beloved Stranger’ and three of the releases by Dead Rock West as well as the debut solo video for his song ‘Kissing The Beast’ which he and Kim Collins of The Smoking Flowers filmed using Super8 cameras.

== Personal life ==
He is married to Cindy Wasserman, singer for Los Angeles roots rock band Dead Rock West and sister of bassist Rob Wasserman.

== Populuxe Records ==
Patrick's first record with Wirepony as well as all of the Truckee Brothers records were released on independent label Populuxe Records along with records by Dead Rock West, Cindy Lee Berryhill and Atom Orr. Populuxe Records was operated by Patrick and partner/founder Christopher Hoffee from early 2004 until 2010 and was distributed by North Carolina–based Redeye Distribution. Patrick left Populuxe quietly only acknowledging in 2011 during a radio interview on San Diego's 94/9 KBZT that the Truckee Brothers were no longer working together in any capacity and he was no longer a part of Populuxe Records. The Truckee Brothers reformed briefly in January 2014 for a series of re-union shows in San Diego, but Patrick did not resume his Populuxe Records involvement.

== Discography ==
- Spun – Patrick Dennis (1997)
- Atlantic EP – Wirepony (2003)
- Wall to Wall – Truckee Brothers (2004)
- It Came From The Speakers – Truckee Brothers (2005)
- Home On The Strange – Wirepony (2007)
- Double Happiness – Truckee Brothers (2007)
- In Pursuit Of Happiness – Truckee Brothers (2007)
- Right Hook Of Love – Wirepony (2010)
- Tour EP One – Wirepony (2010)
- Fürst In The Dirt – Patrick Dennis (2015)

=== Guest appearances ===
- Unraveling – Steve Poltz
- Beloved Stranger – Cindy Lee Berryhill
