= List of Billboard Mainstream Top 40 number-one songs of 2019 =

This is a list of songs that reached number one on the Billboard Mainstream Top 40 (or Pop Songs) chart in 2019.

During 2019, a total of 15 singles hit number-one on the charts.

== Chart history ==
Key
†	Indicates best-performing single of 2019

Issue date	Song	Artist(s)	Ref.
January 5	"High Hopes"	Panic! at the Disco	
January 12	"High Hopes"	Panic! at the Disco	
January 19	"High Hopes"	Panic! at the Disco	
January 26	“Thank U, Next”	Ariana Grande	
February 2	"Without Me" †	Halsey	
February 9	"Without Me" †	Halsey	
February 16	"Without Me" †	Halsey	
February 23	"Without Me" †	Halsey	
March 2	"Eastside"	Benny Blanco, Halsey and Khalid	
March 9	"Without Me" †	Halsey	
March 16	"7 Rings"	Ariana Grande	
March 23	"7 Rings"	Ariana Grande	
March 30	"7 Rings"	Ariana Grande	
April 6	"7 Rings"	Ariana Grande	
April 13	"7 Rings"	Ariana Grande	
April 20	"7 Rings"	Ariana Grande	
April 27	"Sucker"	Jonas Brothers	
May 4	"Sucker"	Jonas Brothers	
May 11	"Sucker"	Jonas Brothers	
May 18	"Sucker"	Jonas Brothers	
May 25	"Sucker"	Jonas Brothers	
June 1	"Sucker"	Jonas Brothers	
June 8	"Sucker"	Jonas Brothers	
June 15	"Sucker"	Jonas Brothers	
June 22	"Wow"	Post Malone	
June 29	"Talk"	Khalid	
July 6	"Talk"	Khalid	
July 13	"Talk"	Khalid	
July 20	"Talk"	Khalid	
July 27	"I Don't Care"	Ed Sheeran and Justin Bieber	
August 3	"I Don't Care"	Ed Sheeran and Justin Bieber	
August 10	"I Don't Care"	Ed Sheeran and Justin Bieber	
August 17	"Bad Guy"	Billie Eilish	
August 24	"Bad Guy"	Billie Eilish	
August 31	"Señorita"	Shawn Mendes and Camila Cabello	
September 7	"Señorita"	Shawn Mendes and Camila Cabello	
September 14	"Señorita"	Shawn Mendes and Camila Cabello	
September 21	"Señorita"	Shawn Mendes and Camila Cabello	
September 28	"Truth Hurts"	Lizzo	
October 5	"Truth Hurts"	Lizzo	
October 12	"Truth Hurts"	Lizzo	
October 19	"Truth Hurts"	Lizzo	
October 26	"Someone You Loved"	Lewis Capaldi	
November 2	"Someone You Loved"	Lewis Capaldi	
November 9	"Someone You Loved"	Lewis Capaldi	
November 16	"Circles"	Post Malone	
November 23	"Circles"	Post Malone	
November 30	"Good as Hell"	Lizzo	
December 7	"Good as Hell"	Lizzo	
December 14	"Good as Hell"	Lizzo	
December 21	"Good as Hell"	Lizzo	
December 28	"Circles"	Post Malone	

== See also ==
- 2019 in American music
