= Who Needs You (The Orwells song) =

Single by The Orwells

from the album Disgraceland
- Released: July 31, 2013
- Genre: Indie rock
- Length: 3:19
- Label: Atlantic
- Songwriter(s): Mario Cuomo, Dominic Corso, Grant Brinner, Henry Brinner, Matt O'Keefe

The Orwells singles chronology
"Mall Rats (La La La)" (2012)	"Who Needs You" (2013)	"Dirty Sheets" (2014)

"Who Needs You" is a song by Chicago-based indie rock band The Orwells. The song was released in 2013 as the lead single from the band's then-upcoming second album, Disgraceland, before charting in 2014.

== Chart performance ==
The song was the first song by the band to chart, where it charted in three Billboard charts. It reached number 23 on the Alternative Songs chart. The song remained in the Alternative Songs charts for 11 weeks. The song also charted in the Hot Rock Songs, Rock Airplay and Rock Digital Songs charts, reaching number 46, 48, and 49, respectively.

== Charts ==
Chart (2014)	Peak position
US Alternative Songs (Billboard)	23
US Hot Rock Songs (Billboard)	46
US Rock Airplay (Billboard)	48
US Rock Digital Songs (Billboard)	49

== Release history ==
Region	Date	Format	Label
United States	July 31, 2013	Digital download	Atlantic Records
