= Alchemy Goods =

- Industry: Fashion
- Headquarters: Seattle, Washington, United States
- Products: Bags and accessories
- Number of employees: 10
- Website: alchemygoods.com

Alchemy Goods is a company with headquarters in Boulder, CO and manufacturing in Seattle, WA. Alchemy Goods creates bags and accessories from recycled materials like salvaged bicycle inner tubes, upcycled denim, and repurposed Advertising Banners. The Ag motto, 'turning useless into useful' refers to Ag's transformation of discarded materials into new products through a process called upcycling. Hundreds of REI, Trek and independent bike shops send used bike tubes to Alchemy Goods every week. Since the recycling program was started in 2006, over 1,000,000 pounds of bike tubes and other salvaged materials have been diverted from landfill.

The first Alchemy Goods bike-tube messenger bag was created by founder Eli Reich in 2004, after someone stole his messenger bag. He crafted it from used bicycle inner tubes. Since that original messenger bag, Alchemy Goods has developed a wide array of upcycled bags and accessories for the urban lifestyle. Every Ag product, which comes with a lifetime guarantee, is manufactured in Seattle, Washington. '
