= Wirepony =

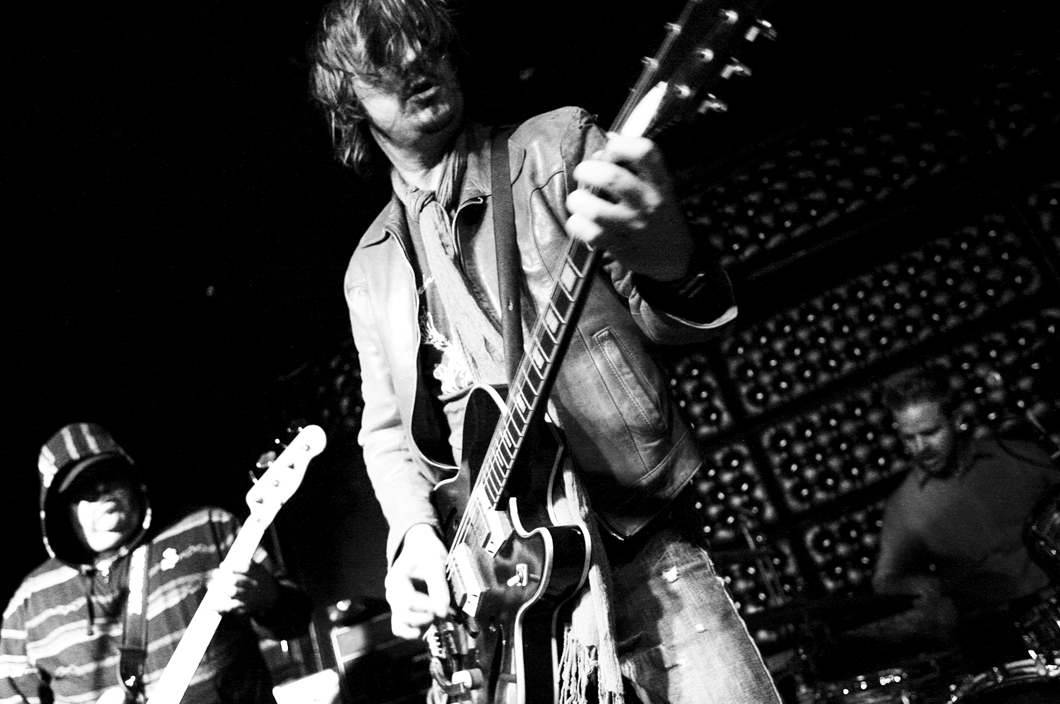
- Wirepony in San Diego in 2010

Background information
- Origin: San Diego, California, U.S.
- Genres: Alternative rock, indie rock, alternative country, folk rock, punk rock
- Years active: 2003–present
- Labels: Populuxe Records, Redeye Distribution, Summertone
- Members: Patrick Dennis
- Past members: Aaron Dennis; O Eddie Glass; Brad Davis; David J Carpenter; Bryan Head; Charlie McCree
- Website: wirepony.com

Wirepony is an American alternative rock band from San Diego, California. It was formed in 2003 by Patrick Dennis after his solo record for punk label Cargo Music was shelved in the late 90s. The first official Wirepony release, 'Home On The Strange' was recorded in 2004 featuring the then rhythm section of punk icon John Doe with guest appearances by Cindy Wasserman of Dead Rock West, but was not officially released until 2007. Other musicians on Wirepony recordings and tour have included members of Fluf, Olivelawn, Reeve Oliver, Tan Sister Radio, Lord Howler and Truckee Brothers. Wirepony's most recent album, 'Right Hook Of Love' was released in January 2010.

== History ==
=== Formation ===
In Spring of 2003 Patrick began recording an EP of songs at the invitation of his future Truckee Brother co-founder Christopher Hoffee, some of which appeared as a hand-made CD titled 'Atlantic' which he passed around to friends but remained unreleased. In February 2004 Patrick brought in David J Carpenter and Bryan Head of John Doe and Peter Case's bands to record a new record, but just a few months later he formed the Truckee Brothers with Hoffee and recorded their first release, Wall to Wall, at the same studio. As a result, the Wirepony record was temporarily shelved. In October 2007 'Home On The Strange' was finally released on Populuxe Records through Redeye Distribution.

In 2008 Wirepony played its first live show featuring O of Fluf on bass and Brad Davis of Reeve Oliver on drums. In March 2009 the band, then featuring Eddie Glass of Olivelawn and O as rhythm section, played the South by Southwest festival and performed a string of dates in the Southwest US. Patrick went on a 32 date solo US tour dubbed the "Lone Pony Tour" supporting fellow San Diego musician Steve Poltz of The Rugburns.

=== Right Hook Of Love ===
In 2010 'Right Hook Of Love' was released on Pioneertown, California, indie label, Summertone. It featured Patrick's then 18-year-old son, Aaron Dennis of Tan Sister Radio on lead guitar, Charlie McCree of San Diego band Lord Howler on drums and O again on bass. Produced by Patrick and the band, it was recorded mainly live at CHAOS Recorders with very few overdubs. Patrick again toured solo on a 20 date US tour with Steve Poltz also filling in for Malcolm Clark of The Sleepy Jackson on drums in Steve Poltz's band, after Malcolm left the tour to return home to Perth, Australia when the 2010 Western Australian storms severely damaged his home and recording studio.

== Post Wirepony ==
It was announced on Wirepony's Facebook page in July 2012 that Patrick was recording a new record in Nashville with production duo Cosmic Thugs (Deer Tick, Diamond Rugs). In the Spring of 2015 it was announced that Patrick's debut solo album was completed and to be called ‘Fürst In The Dirt’.

== Musical style ==
Wirepony's music has been inspired by a wide variety of artists and styles, including The Clash, The Rolling Stones and The Waterboys. Folk elements are as much present as punk partially coming from Patrick's time playing with Dave Sharp of Welsh 1980s band The Alarm whose dedication to both Joe Strummer and Woody Guthrie's legacy heavily influenced Patrick's earlier band, The Homer Gunns, which was formed with Frank Lee Drennen of Dead Rock West when they were still teenagers.

== Populuxe Records involvement ==
Wirepony's first record was released on independent label Populuxe Records along with releases by Dead Rock West, Cindy Lee Berryhill, Atom Orr and Truckee Brothers. Populuxe Records was run by Patrick and Christopher Hoffee from early 2004 until 2010 and distributed by North Carolina–based Redeye Distribution. Patrick left Populuxe quietly only acknowledging in 2011 during a radio interview on San Diego's 94/9 KBZT that the Truckee Brothers were no longer working together in any capacity and he was no longer a part of Populuxe Records.

== Discography ==
- Atlantic EP (2003)
- Home On The Strange (2007)
- Right Hook Of Love (2010)
- Tour EP One (2010)
