= Mirrors (Nivea album) =

Studio album by Nivea
- Released: September 26, 2019
- Genre: R&B
- Length: 39:09
- Label: Hill Music Group
- Producer: Derrian Barnett; Nivea; J. Wells; Stephen Wimberly; David Luke Jr.; Joseph Epperson; Swift on Demand; Dwayne Lindsey; Willard Avery Williams; Twanbeatmaker

Nivea chronology
Animalistic (2006)	Mirrors (2019)

Singles from Mirrors
- 1. "Circles" Released: September 29, 2018

Mirrors is the fourth studio album from American singer and songwriter Nivea, released on September 26, 2019 by Hill Music Group. Mirrors musically differs from Nivea's previous albums.

The album serves as a follow-up to her third album Animalistic (2006) and her first studio album in almost a decade. It features production from Nivea herself, Derrian Barnett, Twanbeatmaker, PlayBoy David Luke Jr., J. Wells, Stephen Wimberly and Delroy Ford. She announced the album's forthcoming release in 2015, stating that it would be part of a "dual project" also including a "stripped down album", The Randy Watson Collection.

== Singles ==
The album's lead single, "Circles" was released on September 29, 2018, along with the accompanying music video.

== Track listing ==
Credits are adapted from the album's liner notes and Tidal.

No.	Title	Writer(s)	Producer(s)	Length
1.	"Ride With Me"	Nivea Nash^{[b]}; Derrian Barnett	Barnett	3:01
2.	"Soul Ties" (featuring PlayBoy Dre')	Akeesha Amoour; Andre Hill; Nash	Twanbeatmaker; Nivea^{[b]}	2:35
3.	"Suicide"	Nash	Nivea	4:04
4.	"Circles"	Joshua Bryant; Nash	Nivea	5:54
5.	"Where Were You"	Cotrell Qualls; Nash	Nivea	4:32
6.	"Away"	Nash	David Luke Jr.; Nivea^{[b]}	3:11
7.	"Even More"	Nash	Luke; Nivea^{[b]}	1:41
8.	"Flower Power"	Erika Sutton; Nash	Stephon Wimberly^{[a]}; J. Wells^{[a]}	2:43
9.	"They Don't"	Nash; Sutton	Swift on Demand	1:47
10.	"Should've Known"	Hill; Nash	Barnett; Nivea^{[b]}	2:26
11.	"Brave"	Hill; Nash	Dwayne "Whateva" Lindsey	2:33
12.	"I Was Good"	Gregory Dowdy; Nash	Nivea	3:43
13.	"Diamonds"	William Cason	William Cason	0:59
Total length:				39:09

Notes

- ^{^[a]} signifies a co-producer
- ^{^[b]} signifies an additional producer

== Charts ==
Chart (2019)	Peak position
US Independent Albums (Billboard)	48

== See also ==
- 2019 in American music
