= Remember When (album) =

Studio album by The Orwells
- Released: August 7, 2012
- Length: 39:04
- Label: Autumn Tone

The Orwells chronology
Remember When (2012)	Disgraceland (2014)

Professional ratings
Review scores
Source	Rating
PopMatters	(6/10)

Remember When is the debut studio album by American band The Orwells. It was released August 7, 2012, on Autumn Tone Records.

== Track list ==
No.	Title	Length
1.	"Lays at Rest"	3:58
2.	"Mallrats (La La La)"	3:00
3.	"Halloween All Year"	3:31
4.	"All the Cool Kids"	2:46
5.	"Suspended"	2:28
6.	"Painted Faces and Long Hair"	2:47
7.	"Hallway Homicide"	2:31
8.	"In My Bed"	2:26
9.	"Never Ever"	4:07
10.	"Like No One Else"	2:29
11.	"Ancient Egypt"	5:09
12.	"Under the Flowers"	3:52
