= Terrible Human Beings =

Studio album by The Orwells
- Released: February 17, 2017
- Genres: Garage punk, garage rock
- Length: 38:26
- Label: Atlantic
- Producer: Jim Abbiss

The Orwells chronology
Disgraceland (2014)	Terrible Human Beings (2017)	The Orwells (2019)

Singles from Terrible Human Beings
- 1. "Buddy" Released: October 3, 2016; 2. "They Put a Body in the Bayou" Released: October 27, 2016; 3. "Double Feature" Released: December 5, 2016

Professional ratings
Aggregate scores
Source	Rating
Metacritic	68/100
Review scores
Source	Rating
AllMusic	3.5/5 stars
Exclaim!	5/10 stars
Pitchfork	5.8/10
PopMatters	7/10 stars
Slant	4/5 stars

Terrible Human Beings is the third studio album by American band the Orwells. It was released February 17, 2017, by Atlantic Records. It would be the band's final album released before their breakup in 2018, although it was followed with the self-released album, The Orwells, in 2019.

== Track listing ==
All songs written by The Orwells

No.	Title	Length
1.	"They Put a Body in the Bayou"	3:10
2.	"Fry"	2:03
3.	"Creatures"	2:30
4.	"Vacation"	2:50
5.	"Black Francis"	2:38
6.	"M.A.D."	2:59
7.	"Buddy"	1:26
8.	"Hippie Soldier"	3:29
9.	"Heavy Head"	2:54
10.	"Body Reprise"	1:14
11.	"Ring Pop"	2:29
12.	"Last Call (Go Home)"	3:25
13.	"Double Feature"	7:19
Total length:		38:26

== Personnel ==
The Orwells

- Mario Cuomo – Lead vocals
- Dominic Corso – Guitar
- Matt O'Keefe – Guitar
- Grant Brinner – Bass
- Henry Brinner – Drums

Production

- Producer– Jim Abbiss
- Additional production – Bobby Lord
- Engineer – Nyles Spencer
- Engineer – Ian Dowling
- Mastered by – Greg Calbi
