= Disgraceland (The Orwells album) =

Studio album by the Orwells
- Released: June 3, 2014
- Genres: Garage rock, indie rock
- Length: 35:14
- Label: Atlantic
- Producers: Dave Sitek, Chris Coady, Jim Abbiss

The Orwells chronology
Remember When (2012)	Disgraceland (2014)	Terrible Human Beings (2017)

Singles from Disgraceland
- 1. "Who Needs You" Released: July 31, 2013; 2. "Dirty Sheets" Released: December 3, 2013; 3. "The Righteous Ones" Released: February 3, 2014; 4. "Let It Burn" Released: March 24, 2014

Disgraceland is the second studio album by American band the Orwells. It was released June 3, 2014, by Atlantic Records.

== Singles ==
"Who Needs You", was the first single by the band to ever chart. The song received moderate radio airplay, and charted on the Billboard Hot Rock Songs, Rock Airplay and Rock Digital Songs.

== Critical reception ==
Professional ratings
Aggregate scores
Source	Rating
Metacritic	60/100
Review scores
Source	Rating
AllMusic	3.5/5 stars
Alternative Press	0.5/5 stars
Consequence of Sound	B
NME	4/5 stars
Pitchfork	6.2/10
Q	3/5 stars
Uncut	3/5 stars

Disgraceland received mixed to positive reviews from critics. On Metacritic, it has been given a score of 60 out of 100 based on 12 reviews. Ryan Bray of Consequence of Sound gave the album a positive review, saying that The Orwells "own their brattiness", which "makes for a more-than-satisfying modern rock record that's both carefully crafted and shot straight from the hip". Gregory Heany of AllMusic awarded the album three and a half stars, saying to "not overthink [Disgraceland], because time spent pontificating about their age is time that could be better used for partying." Stuart Berman of Pitchfork had a more mixed review of the album, saying the Orwells are "fully aware they're reinventing a wheel that's been essentially worn down to the rim". Berman also noted the ambition that the album proceeds, saying that the band's "first major-label outing suggests that the Orwells clearly have loftier ambitions than cracking the Midwest garage circuit." Berman did praise the band's self-awareness, with "As he sings, “From the east and to the west, we ain't the worst, we ain't the best.” By that measure, Disgraceland is truth in advertising."

In a staff review, the Alternative Press described the album as "hilariously monotone". In their negative review, Alternative Press described the album as an album loaded with "crass lyrics" and "elementary rhymes". Alt Press gave the album one-half of a star out of five. Rhian Daly of NME was more receptive to the album, giving the album four out of five stars. Daly called the album a "party" and said that Disgraceland is a "rock 'n' roll joyride".

== Commercial performance ==
Disgraceland was the band's first studio album to chart. The album debuted at number 69 on the U.S. Billboard 200 during the week of June 21, 2014 and stayed on the chart for a week. Outside of the Billboard 200, Disgraceland also charted on the Billboard Alternative Albums, debuting at number 16. Additionally, the album charted on the Billboard Top Rock Albums and Tastemaker Albums reaching number 18 and 19 respectively.

== Track listing ==
No.	Title	Length
1.	"Southern Comfort"	2:43
2.	"The Righteous One"	3:35
3.	"Dirty Sheets"	2:29
4.	"Bathroom Tile Blues"	3:10
5.	"Gotta Get Down"	3:00
6.	"Let It Burn"	3:29
7.	"Who Needs You"	3:18
8.	"Norman"	4:25
9.	"Always 'N' Forever"	2:41
10.	"Blood Bubbles"	3:10
11.	"North Ave."	3:14

== Charts ==
Chart (2014)	Peak position
US Billboard 200	69
US Billboard Alternative Albums	16
US Billboard Top Rock Albums	18
US Billboard Tastemaker Albums	19
