= Trek Bicycle Corporation =

American bicycle manufacturing company

- Type: Private company
- Industry: Bicycles
- Founded: 1976; 50 years ago
- Headquarters: Waterloo, Wisconsin, U.S.
- Key people: John Burke, President
- Products: Bicycles and related components
- Revenue: US$1.0 billion
- Number of employees: 1,800
- Parent: Intrepid Corporation
- Subsidiaries: List: Trek India; Fahrradhandel Gesellschaft GmbH& (Austria); Bikeurope BV (Netherlands); Trek Denmark; Trek Bicycle GmbH (Germany); Trek Japan; Bike USA S.L. (Spain); Trek Fahrrad AG (Switzerland); Trek UK; Trek Korea; Electra Bicycle Company
- Website: trekbikes.com

Trek Bicycle Corporation is an American bicycle and accessory manufacturer and distributor headquartered in Waterloo, Wisconsin. Its brands include Trek, Electra Bicycle Company, Bontrager, and Diamant Bikes. The company has previously manufactured bikes under the Gary Fisher, LeMond Racing Cycles, Klein, and Villiger Bikes brand names.

Trek bicycles are marketed through numerous independently owned bicycle shops across North America, as well as through subsidiaries and distributors worldwide. Nearly all Trek bicycles are manufactured outside the United States, in countries including the Netherlands, Germany, Taiwan, and China.

== History ==
=== Establishment (1976–1984) ===
In December 1975, Dick Burke and Bevil Hogg established Trek Bicycle as a wholly owned subsidiary of Roth Corporation, a Milwaukee-based appliance distributor. In early 1976, with a payroll of five, Trek started manufacturing steel touring frames in Waterloo, Wisconsin, aiming at the mid to high-end market dominated by Japanese and Italian-made models. Trek built nearly 900 custom hand-brazed framesets that first year, each selling for under $200. Later that same year, Trek Bicycle was incorporated. In 1977, Penn Cycle in Richfield, Minnesota became the first Trek retailer in the world. Within three years, Trek sales approached $2,000,000 in 1979.

Hampered without additional manufacturing capacity, Trek sales plateaued in the late 1970s. In just a few years, Trek had outgrown its original "red barn" manufacturing facility—a former carpet warehouse. Recognizing the need for expansion, in 1980 Trek broke ground on a new 26,000 sq ft (2,400 m^{2}) corporate headquarters on the outskirts of Waterloo. Company co-founder Dick Burke would later recall that "it wasn't until we built the new factory that we became a business." With more factory space available, Trek expanded its manufacturing to include complete bikes. In 1981, Trek entered the steel road racing bike market, introducing the "Pro" line, including the 750 and 950 models, and in 1983, Trek built its first mountain bike, the 850. In 1984, Trek ventured into the aftermarket parts and accessories business, launching its Trek Components Group (TCG) department.

=== Technological developments (1985–1991) ===
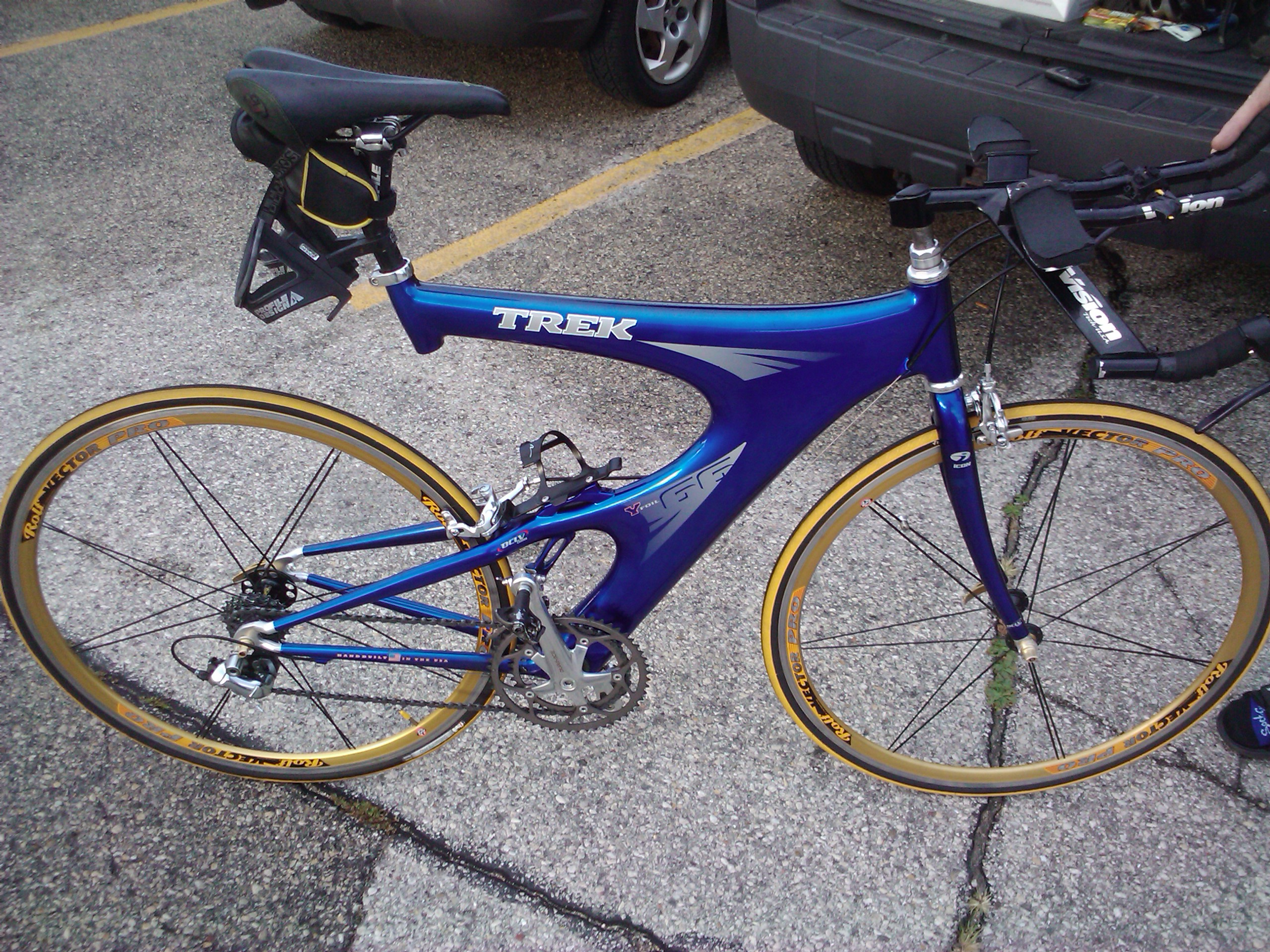
A carbon fiber Y-foil from the late 1990s

In 1985, borrowing technology from the aerospace industry, (and bike companies such as Alan and Vitus), Trek introduced its first bonded aluminum bike frame, the 2000. The introduction of bonded aluminum to Trek's production line proved very problematic for a company that had built itself on hand-brazed steel frames. Manufacturing ground to a halt as Trek worked to figure out how to build bonded frames in a production environment. A year later, Trek followed up the success of the 2000 with a 3-tube carbon composite model, the 2500. Thus began Trek's foray into carbon fiber. That same year, to keep up with rapidly growing sales, Trek added another 75,000 sq ft (7,000 m^{2}) of manufacturing space to its Waterloo headquarters. In 1988, Trek introduced "Trek Wear," marking the company's entry into the cycling apparel business. A year later, Trek expanded into foreign markets, opening subsidiary offices in the UK and in Germany. That same year, Trek introduced its Jazz brand of bicycles, a collection of entry-level and kids' bikes designed by Trek but manufactured in Taiwan. Jazz bicycles were discontinued in 1993.

1989 was a pivotal year for Trek, marking the year that the company unveiled its first molded carbon fiber frame, the Trek 5000. The 5000 frameset (monocoque carbon frame plus bonded aluminum fork) had an advertised weight of 3.3 lb (1.5 kg). Designed by Trek but built by Brent Trimble, an outside manufacturer, the 5000 suffered enough quality problems that it was discontinued after just one year. But the lessons learned from the 5000 would prove to be instrumental in driving Trek to develop its own carbon manufacturing capabilities in the coming years.

In 1990, Trek developed a new category of bicycle that combined the comfort features of a mountain bike with the quick ride of a road bike: MultiTracks, Trek's first line of hybrid bikes, were born. That same year, Trek also introduced its first line of kids' bikes. In 1991, Trek opened its first company-owned retail store in nearby Madison, Wisconsin. In addition to showcasing a full line of Trek products, the Trek Store served as a hands-on sales training center for employees from Trek's headquarters who lacked retail experience. The store also provided an outlet for Trek to test merchandising and marketing ideas before expanding them to its network of independent bicycle retailers.

=== OCLV and acquisitions (1992–1996) ===
In the early 1990s, Trek's director of technology, Bob Read, attended an aerospace industry trade show in Salt Lake City, Utah, eventually meeting up with a closed mold tooling company called Radius Engineering. That visit convinced Read that Trek's future success depended on building frames from carbon fiber, a material he envisioned could be used to make light, strong frames. Having lived through the troubled introduction of the 5000, Trek invested heavily in in-house carbon fiber manufacturing capabilities. In 1992, Trek unveiled its first home-grown, full-carbon framed bicycles, the 5500 and 5200, featuring OCLV Carbon frames. OCLV stands for "Optimum Compaction, Low Void" and refers to Trek's proprietary process for creating carbon structures that exceed aerospace standards. Weighing only 2.44 lb (1.11 kg), the 5500 frame was the world's lightest production road frame. To make room for its new OCLV manufacturing facility, Trek expanded its Waterloo headquarters again to a total of 140,000 sq ft (13,000 m^{2}). 1992 marked another first for Trek: its first full suspension mountain bike, the 9000-series, which featured Trek's T3C (travel is three times compression) suspension system.

In 1993, Trek introduced its first OCLV Carbon mountain bike frames, the 9800 and the 9900, which at 2.84 lb (1.29 kg) was the world's lightest production mountain bike frame. Trek also acquired Gary Fisher Mountain Bikes, named after Gary Fisher, one of the inventors of the mountain bike and one of the most popular names in off-road cycling. Fisher had founded Gary Fisher Mountain Bikes in 1983 and sold his company in 1991 to Taiwan's Anlen company, remaining on as President. In 1992, Howie Cohen, who had previously imported Nishiki, Azuki and Kuwahara bicycles, assisted Gary Fisher with his brand — 18 months later brokering the acquisition of Fisher by Trek (in 1993).

In 1994, Trek entered the growing home fitness arena, introducing Trek Fitness Exercycles. In 1996, Trek discontinued the Exercycle line, spinning off its fitness division into an independently owned company, renamed Vision Fitness.

In 1995, Trek introduced its full suspension Y bike, a departure from traditional bike design. The Y bike sold well, and won an "Outstanding Design and Engineering Award" from Popular Mechanics magazine. Also in 1995, Trek made a number of business moves in order to diversify its product offering and gain market share, acquiring Klein Bicycles, a Chehalis, WA, manufacturer of premium aluminum-framed bicycles, as well as Bontrager Cycles, a Santa Cruz, CA-based manufacturer of bicycle components and hand-built steel frames. Trek also signed a long-term licensing agreement with Greg LeMond, the 3-time Tour de France champion and the first American to win the Tour—to design, build, and distribute LeMond Racing Cycles. 1995 was also the year Trek opened a state-of-the-art assembly facility in Whitewater, Wisconsin, leaving the Waterloo location free to focus solely on frame production.

=== Lance Armstrong and further expansion (1997–2005) ===
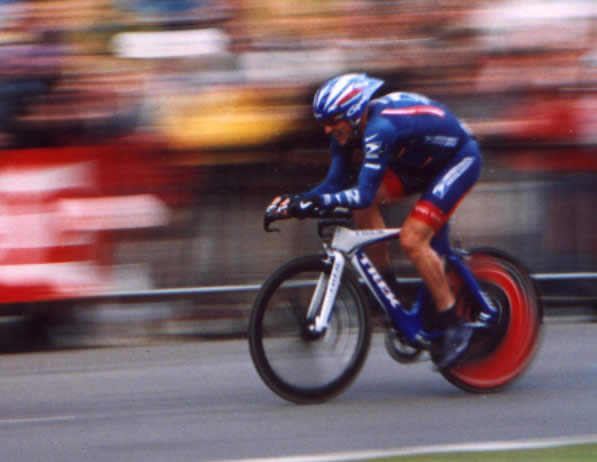
Lance Armstrong in the prologue of the 2004 Tour de France in Liège, Belgium

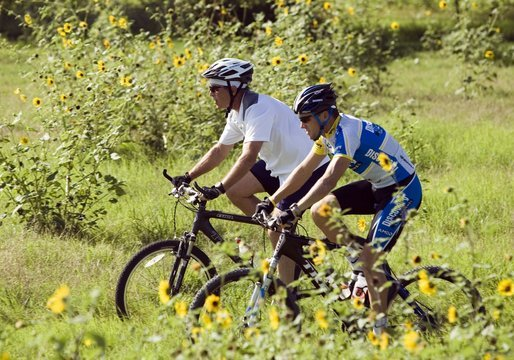
President George W. Bush and Armstrong take a ride together on Trek mountain bikes at the President's Prairie Chapel Ranch in Texas, 2005

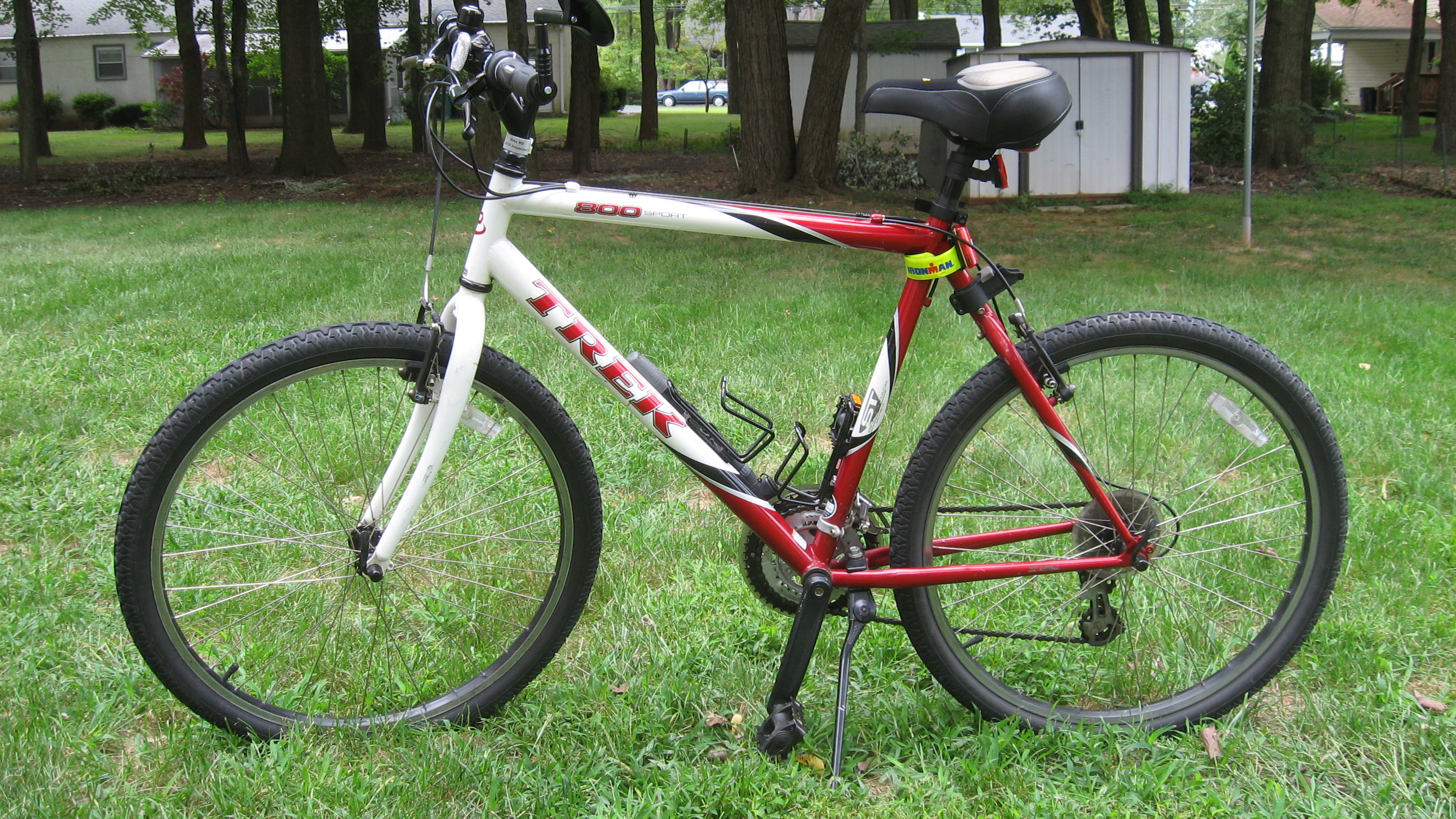
Steel-framed 2002 Trek 800 Sport mountain bike

In 1997, Trek helped sign former world road race champion (1993) Lance Armstrong to the Trek-sponsored United States Postal Service Pro Cycling Team. Armstrong won his first Tour de France in 1999 aboard a Trek 5500, becoming the first American to win the Tour on an American team riding an American made bicycle. Armstrong went on to win a record-setting seven-consecutive Tours de France, all of them aboard Trek bicycles aside from a few early time trial stages that he rode aboard a Litespeed bike, painted and badged as a Trek.

In 1998, Trek established its Advanced Concepts Group (ACG), a collection of designers, engineers & technicians dedicated to technologies development. The leading edge of Trek's design and engineering efforts, ACG is perhaps best known for a number of products introduced and used by Lance Armstrong during his historic Tour de France wins, including the original Trek Madone (2003)—named for the Col de la Madone, a 12K climb that starts in the French town of Menton and used by Armstrong to test his fitness—and TTX time trial bike (2005). That same year, Trek opened its first European manufacturing facility, a frame and wheel assembly plant in Carlow, Ireland. The Carlow facility stayed open until late 2004, at which time Trek transferred its European production to a manufacturing facility in Hartmannsdorf, Germany.

Responding to the unique needs of female cyclists, in 2000 Trek introduced Women's Specific Design (WSD) bicycle and accessories. WSD products are designed to fit female riders, and feature sizing and proportions appropriate for women. In October 2001, Trek introduced a custom bike program named Project One, which gave customers the opportunity to customize their Trek bike by selecting the bike's paint scheme and component mix.

Hoping to expand into a new market segment, Trek introduced Trek Travel in December 2002, a provider of luxury cycling vacations (bike tours) in Europe and North America. Trek Travel operated as a wholly owned subsidiary of Trek Bicycle until January 2007, when Trek spun off its interests in the company. Trek and Trek Travel enjoy a close working relationship. Trek Travel provides award-winning cycling, hiking and multi adventure tours in Europe, North America, Central America, South America and Asia. Trek Travel has been listed as a Worlds Best Tour Operator 6 years with Travel & Leisure. Welcoming a varying level of activities and focused on hospitality.

In 2003, Trek acquired Villiger, a Swiss bicycle company, and Diamant, the oldest bicycle company in Germany. The acquisition gave Trek a foothold in the active-leisure bicycle market, an important segment in Europe. As part of the acquisition, Trek took over ownership of the Villiger-Diamant production facility in Hartmannsdorf, Mittelsachsen, Germany. Trek's global expansion continued in 2005, when Trek expanded into the Chinese market by opening two stores in Beijing and signing deals with 20 Chinese distributors.

For the third time in its history, in 2005 Trek again expanded its worldwide headquarters in Waterloo, adding another 43,000 sq ft (4,000 m^{2}) to house its burgeoning engineering, research and development, and marketing departments. As part of the expansion, Trek included an atrium exhibit to display a number of historically significant bikes from Trek's family of brands, including one of the first mountain bikes ever built by Gary Fisher, and seven bikes used by Lance during his historic Tour de France run (one from each year, 1999–2005).

=== 2006–present ===
In 2008, Trek and health insurance company Humana piloted a bike-sharing program at the 2008 Democratic National Convention in Denver, and B-Cycle was subsequently formed as a partnership between Humana, Trek, and advertising agency Crispin Porter + Bogusky. The venture launched the first large-scale citywide bike-sharing system in the United States in Denver in April 2010. In September 2024, Trek agreed to sell its BCycle bike-share business to Bicycle Transit Systems.

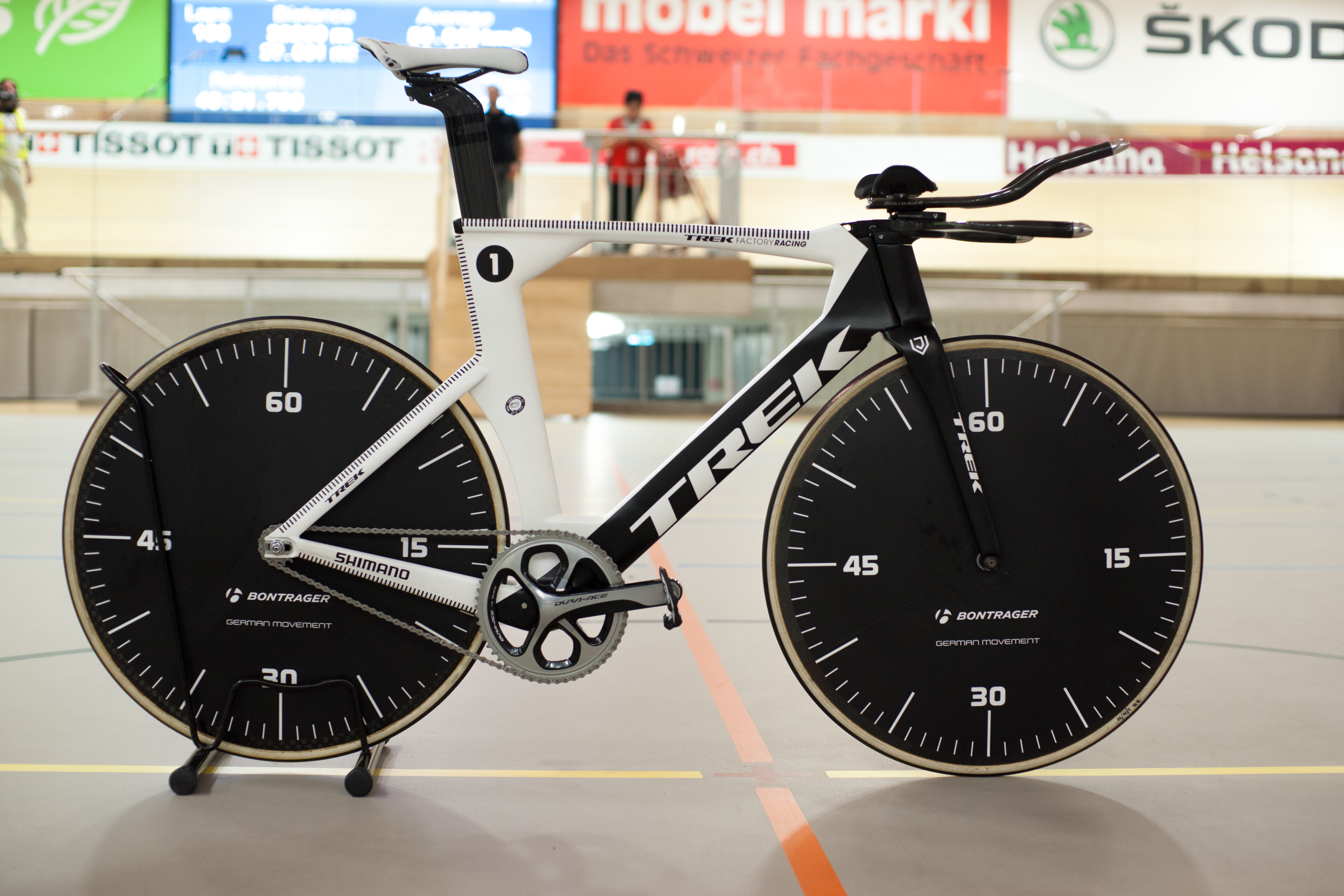
Trek bicycle on which Jens Voigt achieved the 2014 hour record

In 2008, after years of behind-the-scenes support for the League of American Bicyclists and the Bikes Belong Coalition (now PeopleForBikes), Trek announced its 1 World 2 Wheels bicycle advocacy campaign at its annual Trek World dealer convention in Madison, Wisconsin. Central to 1 World 2 Wheels is its "Go By Bike" initiative, which urges Americans to ride their bikes instead of drive their cars for trips of two miles (3 km) or less. Through 1 World 2 Wheels Trek also pledged $1,000,000 to help fund the League of American Bicyclists' "Bicycle Friendly Community" program and committed $600,000 to the International Mountain Bicycling Association's (IMBA) Trail Solutions Services. On January 6, 2014, Trek announced the acquisition of the Electra Bicycle Company.

In 2009, Trek created the Trek Women Triathlon Series. 2011, Trek sponsored three women's triathlon series; the Trek Women Triathlon Series, the Danskin Series and the Iron Girl Series.

In 2014, the Union Cycliste Internationale unified the two classifications into a single classification in line with regulations for current track pursuit bikes. Following the change in the rules, German Jens Voigt became the first rider to attempt the hour record, on September 18, 2014, at the Velodrome Suisse, Grenchen, Switzerland on a Trek bicycle. He set a new record of 51.110 km, beating the previous record set by Sosenka by 1.410 km.

As from the 2014 season, Trek became the main sponsor of Pro Tour cycling team Trek Factory Racing, a continuation of its bike sponsorship of Team RadioShack and co-sponsorship of Team Leopard-Trek. In 2017, Trek paid equal prize money to the male and female winners of the Cyclocross World Cup race hosted at their headquarters in Waterloo, Wisconsin, which was "the first time in the history of the sport that women would be paid as much as men for racing the same course at the World Cup level."

In 2021, Trek announced the release of its professional level Madone.

== Brands ==
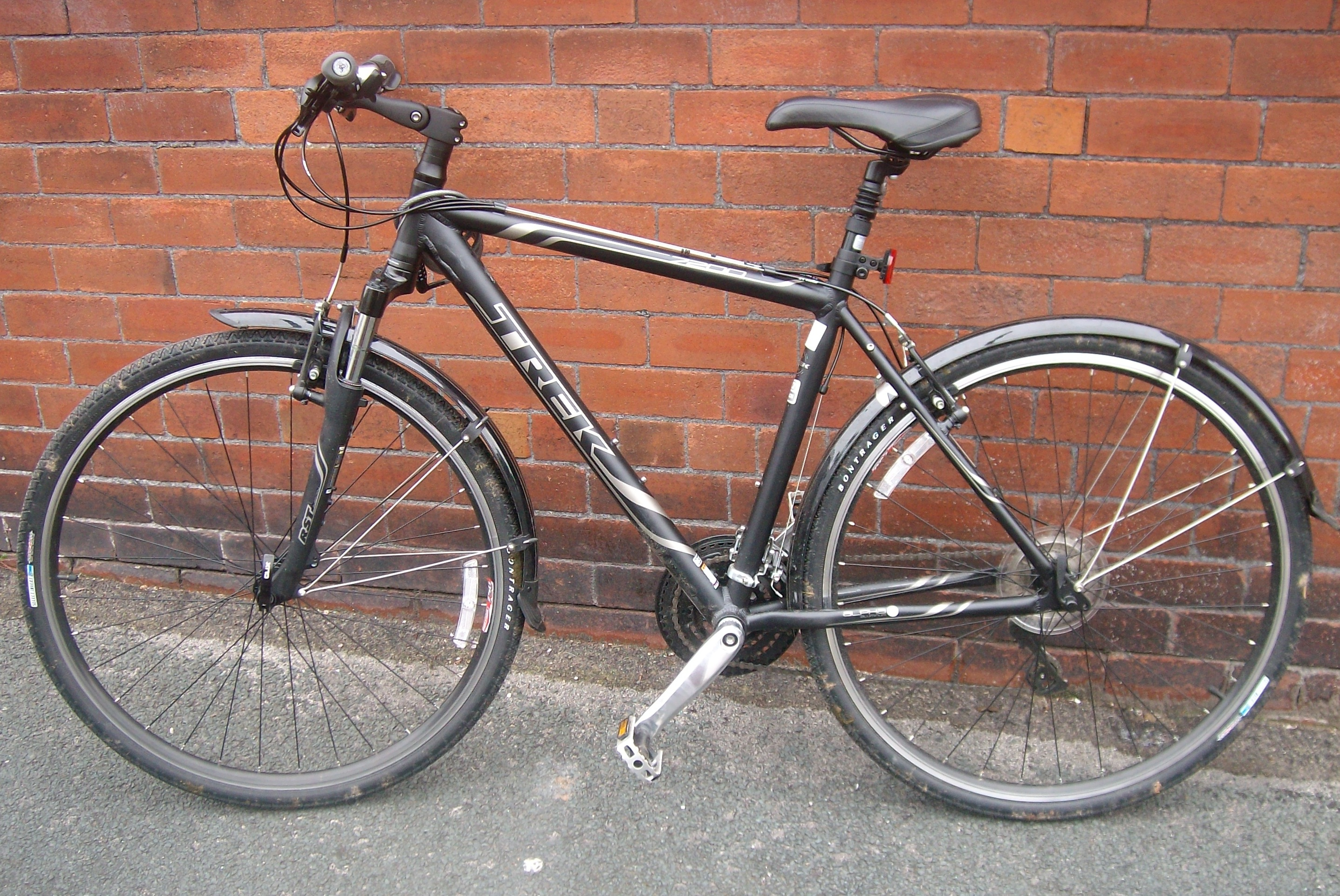
Trek 7200 hybrid bicycle (2008)

The Trek Bicycle Corporation consists of several brands:

- Trek Bikes
- Electra Bicycle Company
- Klein Bikes (discontinued)
- LeMond Racing Cycles (discontinued)
- Gary Fisher Bikes (discontinued)
- Diamant Bikes (Germany)
- Villiger Bikes (discontinued)
- Bontrager parts — Trek's in-house parts and accessories
- Trek Travel — Provider of cycling vacations and tours

== Products ==
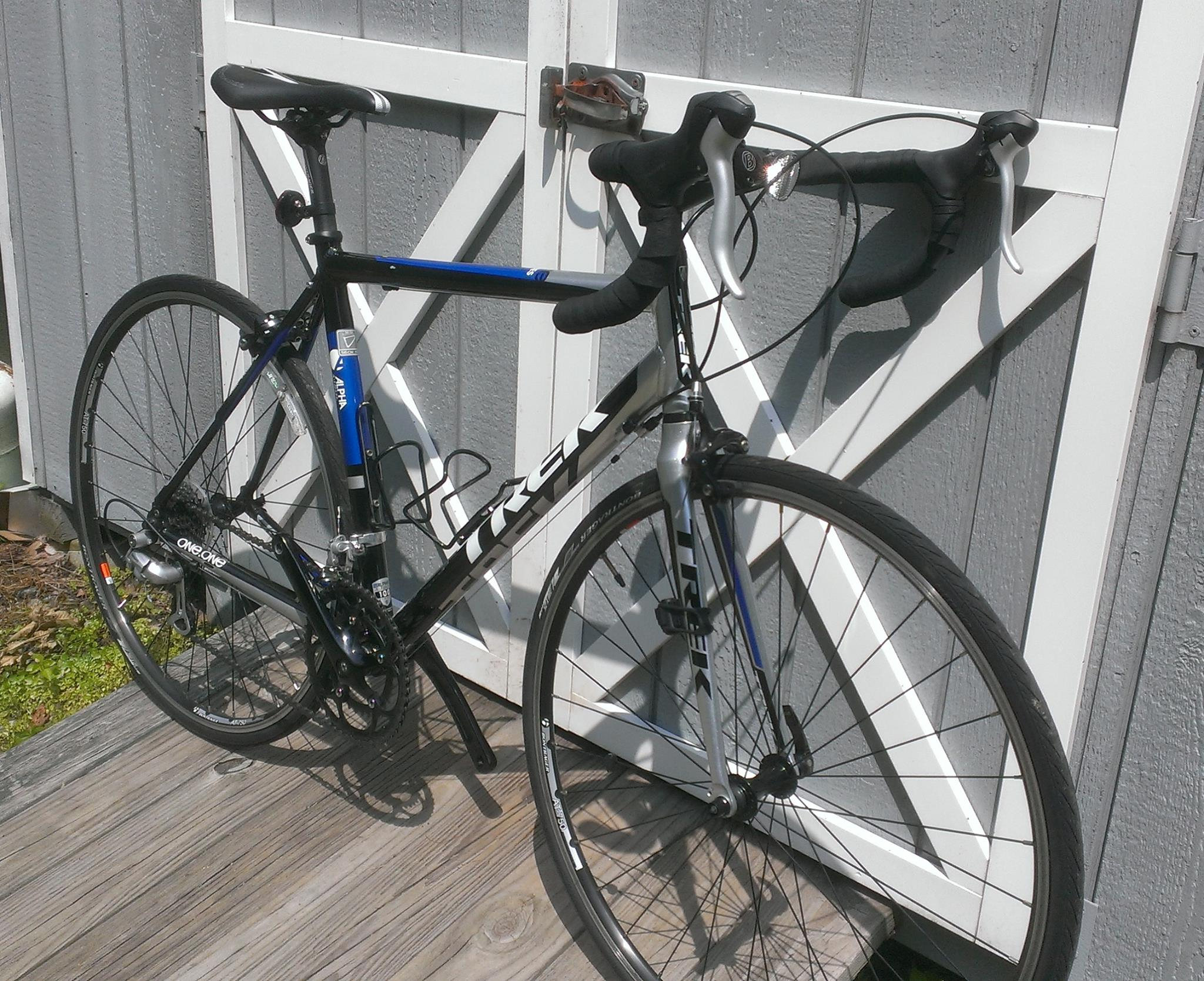
An aluminum-framed 2012 Trek 1.1 Road Bike

In early days Trek manufactured bikes 'in house' in Wisconsin and in the mid-90's acquired the brands: Bontrager, Gary Fisher, LeMond Racing Cycles, Klein, and Villiger Bikes, bringing some of that manufacturing in-house as well. Nearly all Trek bicycles frames are currently produced in Taiwan, Cambodia and China. Some of the high-end frames made in Taiwan are painted and have parts installed in Wisconsin as per the Project One custom bike program, but no 'production' Trek bikes are made in America at this time. An important supplier is the Chinese company Quest Composite Technology, which also produces frames for the German brand "Canyon".

=== Eco-friendly products ===
For the year 2010, Trek teamed with multiple suppliers to provide eco-friendly products. This includes brand new bikes that are economically priced and are made out of steel, it being an easier material to obtain and recycle. Also, Trek has stated to provide bike shops with funds to start recycling old tubes to be sent to Alchemy Goods in Seattle, Washington, to be made into bags, seat bags, and panniers.

=== Bontrager ===
Bontrager branded products include helmets, tires, wheels, handlebars, stems, seatposts, saddles, electronics and cycling shoes, water bottles, cycling clothing and other accessories. The Bontrager brand name is being phased out and replaced with Trek branded products, adding the Bontrager name to Klein, Gary Fisher and LeMond as American companies that Trek has acquired and then dissolved.

=== LeMond ===
The relationship between Trek and Tour-de-France winner Greg LeMond went back to at least 1995 when LeMond licensed Trek to produce LeMond branded bicycles. According to Trek, "In 1999, the LeMond line was one of the fastest growing road bike brands and one of the top five largest road bike brands in the United States".

In March 2008, LeMond Cycling Inc prepared a suit against Trek, accusing it of bowing to pressure from "third parties" to "wind down" his brand through lack of distribution and promotion, especially in the European market. The complaint also says that "Since 2001, Trek has systematically sought to silence Mr. LeMond's right to make comments that constitute an informed and honest opinion on matters of legitimate public interest – the problems associated with the use of performance enhancing substances". The complaint includes examples of Trek threatening its ties with LeMond in 2001 and 2004 after he made public statements against doping, Michele Ferrari, and Lance Armstrong

Trek responded in April 2008 by suing to sever business ties with LeMond. Trek's press release said that "LeMond's suit was characterized by Burke as containing false and irresponsible allegations". Burke also said "for years, Greg LeMond has done and said things that have damaged the LeMond brand and the Trek brand as a whole". . . . "His actions are inconsistent with our values—values we believe in and live everyday. And after years of trying to make it work, we are done." The suit was settled out of court in 2010. As of 2021 LeMond remains the only American Tour de France champion and was eventually awarded a congressional gold medal for his career long commitment to cycling.
