= Electra Bicycle Company =

Bicycle company

- Type: Private
- Industry: Bicycles
- Founded: 1993; 33 years ago
- Headquarters: Encinitas, California, U.S.
- Products: Bicycle and related components
- Parent: Trek Bicycle Corporation
- Website: http://www.electrabike.com/

Electra Bicycle Company is an American bicycle brand and subsidiary of Trek Bicycle Corporation. It was founded in Leucadia, California, in 1993 by Benno Bänziger and Jeano Erforth, and was acquired by Trek in 2014. Electra offers a wide range of modern cruiser bicycles. Additionally, Electra designed and sells comfort bikes and hybrid bicycles. Electra also sells a line of accessories, apparel, and bicycle parts.

== History ==
=== Conception ===
Electra was founded in 1993 by Benno Baezinger. A Swiss national, Baezinger grew up in the Swiss Embassy in West Berlin interested in California and action sports. As a teenager, he began designing and manufacturing snowboards in Germany, later moving to California after graduating with a degree in graphic design. He founded Projekt Design in 1990, working for companies including K2 and Adidas. Baezinger considered manufacturing snowboards or skateboards, but felt those markets were crowded with competitors and thought it was a poor bet for a beginning manufacturer. He turned his attention to bicycles.

Baezinger told the San Diego Union-Tribune, "The one thing I found when I looked at cycling in the US was that everything was some kind of sport, but very few people used bikes for fun or for transportation. I wanted to introduce the 'having a bike in your life' factor, as opposed to 'being a cyclist'".

=== Establishment ===
Classic Electra headbadge

At the time, there were very few cruisers, the classic "fun" bike, on the market. "Back in 1993, there were no cruisers available", Erforth told the Carlsbad Local News, "You could buy a $99 Huffy at Wal-Mart, or you could try to find an old one and restore it, which is very expensive". Bänziger decided there was a market niche for a stylish, affordable cruiser bicycle for people in their twenties and began working on designs that combined classic looks with contemporary technology. Around this time, Bänziger met Erforth, a fellow German transplant who was selling pieces of the Berlin Wall. Erforth said he could sell the kind of bikes Bänziger was designing, so the two pooled $30,000 in personal savings and founded Electra Bicycle Company. The two were the firm's sole shareholders through at least 2004.

The new Electra cruisers were manufactured by a Taiwanese contractor and the two partners began trying to sell them to bike shops. At first, "Dealers laughed at us", says Bänziger. "But people realized they didn't need a mountain bike to go to the grocery store."

Electra advertising in the early days focused on the company's combination of classic looks with more modern features, such as aluminum frames and multiple speeds, with the tagline "Modern cruisers, with modern components, for modern people".

=== Hot rod influences ===
In 2002, the company diversified its products, introducing the new "Stream Ride" series. These new bikes were still in the cruiser tradition, but were inspired by the Southern California hot rod "kustom kar" culture. The lines of the bike frames became more exaggerated, chrome plating was applied generously, and paint jobs became much more elaborate with flames, metal flakes, and wild colors. "Chopper" style elements like shortened rear fenders, racing "slik" tires, and elongated forks were introduced. Models carried hot-rod names like "Rockabilly Boogy" or "Rat Rod". The company even offered balloon tires with flame-patterned tread.

In a more explicit tribute to the car culture, Electra brought out a "Rat Fink" model, licensed by the estate of legendary hot-rodder 'Big Daddy" Ed Roth. "We have spent a lot of time at hot rod hangouts during our time in California", Erforth told the Tacoma News-Tribune. 'We made a connection with the people who have the licensing for the Rat Fink (logo and name). We wanted to make something that would be appreciated by that community." The bike's strikingly curved frame and poison green color has attracted press attention, bringing new riders to the Electra brand. Car enthusiasts have started buying Electra bikes.

== Crank forward geometry ==
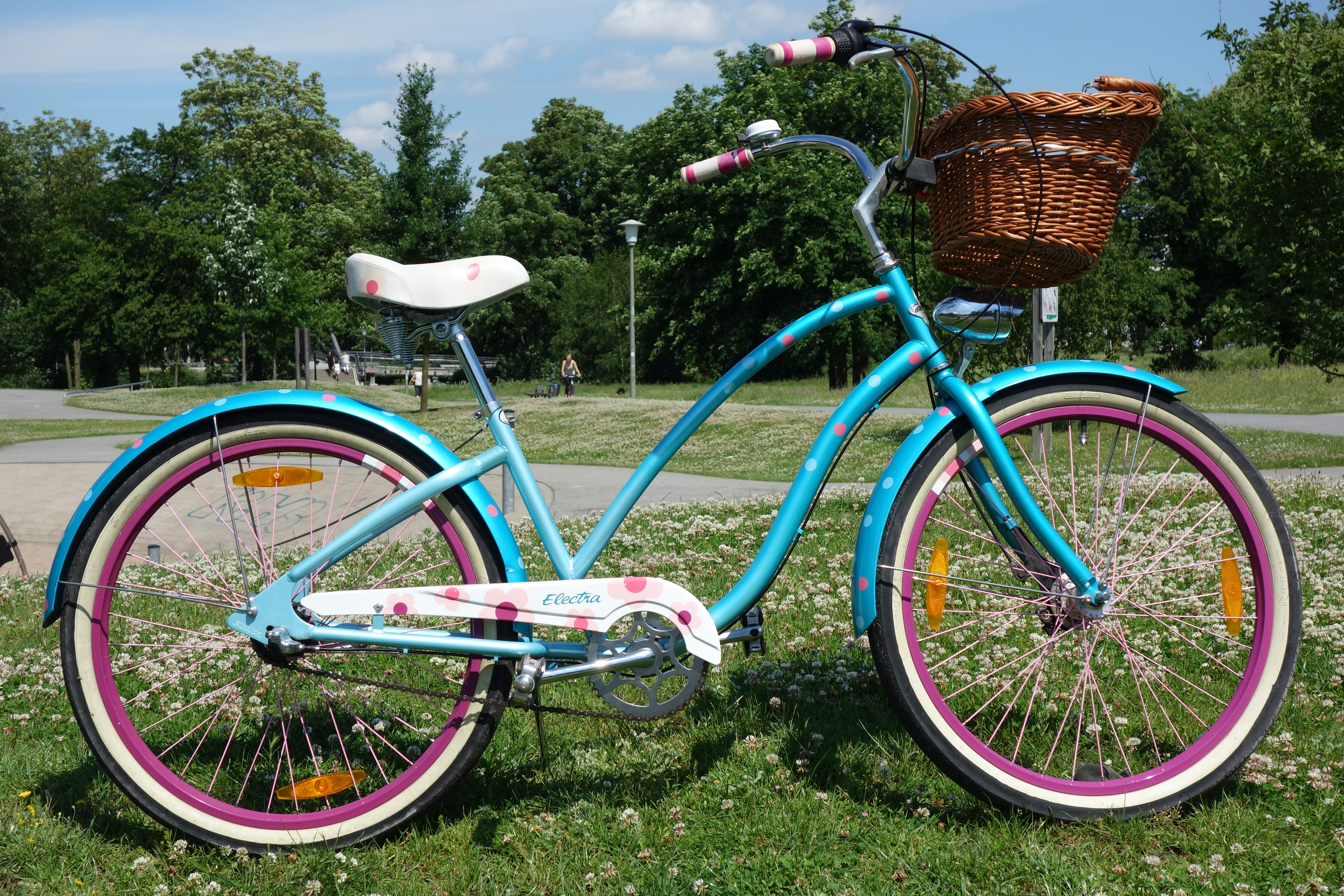
Lady bike, beach cruiser by Electra Bicycle Company

In 2003, the company introduced its Townie model, using a crank forward geometry, marketed as Flat Foot Technology, where a seated rider's feet can rest flat on the ground — combining aspects of cruiser geometry with recumbent geometry, moving the pedals forward and the seat back. Once the rider starts pedaling, they will experience proper leg extension as a result of the relaxed seat angle and the forward placement of the pedals.

The crank forward design was noted for mitigating a new cyclist's fear of falling off the bike. "The bike had to be easy to ride and put a smile on your face", Bänziger says.

The company partnered with fashion design firm Petro Zillia to produce a high-end fashion bike that has a strong graphic quality. The bike was featured widely in the fashion press, and Petro Zillia's chief designer Nony Tochterman gained coverage by riding the Electra up the runway at a fashion show.

== See also ==
- Cruiser bicycle
- Single speed
