= The Orwells (album) =

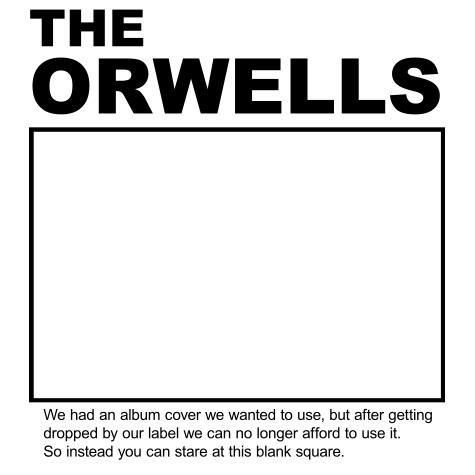

Studio album by The Orwells
- Released: June 15, 2019
- Genre: Indie rock; alternative rock; surf rock; psychedelic rock
- Length: 43:54
- Label: Self-released
- Producer: Mario Cuomo

The Orwells chronology
| Terrible Human Beings (2017) | The Orwells (2019) | Friendly Fire (2023) |

The Orwells is the fourth studio album by American punk rock band, The Orwells. The album was self-released on June 15, 2019.

== Background and recording ==
The band released their third studio album, Terrible Human Beings in February 2017. From February 20 to December 6, 2017, the band was on a European and North American tour in promotion of the new album. The band played one show on June 8, 2018 in their hometown of Chicago, which would end up being their final show as a band.

Throughout the summer of 2018, while recording material for their fourth studio album, stories began circulating about the band and a series of sexual abuse. On August 29, 2018, the Orwells announced that they had disbanded. This came in the wake of members of the band being accused of sexual misconduct.

On September 10, 2018, Consequence of Sound published a series of allegations made by 9 women who accused members of the band with serious instances of sexual abuse: "The Orwells’ abuse was not only a well-known scene secret, but it was something that happened to so many women WITHIN the scene. Girlfriends of band members, friends of girlfriends of band members, to the women that are in the front row every show, etc. People were so close to the abuse. They saw what happened to their friends and knew these awful dudes lived nearby. I think they didn't want to start even more trouble."

These allegations had initially been raised on Reddit and Twitter against Cuomo and the Brinner brothers. The range of allegations include rape, sexual relations with underage girls, and sending unsolicited nude photos. The Orwells issued a statement to Paste magazine denying allegations.

Less than a year following the allegations, Mario Cuomo, posted a link to their fourth studio album via the band's subreddit page. The message read "Hey everybody. I could not wait any longer for this record to be heard. Sorry it has taken so long but it would have taken even longer if I didn't make the decision to self release this album. Self recorded, self titled, self released. The Orwells".

== Track listing ==
| No. | Title | Length |
|---|---|---|
| 1. | "All Cleaned Up" | 4:07 |
| 2. | "The Boxer" | 3:29 |
| 3. | "Nightclub" | 4:19 |
| 4. | "Sweetness" | 3:57 |
| 5. | "Mean Motherfucker" | 4:06 |
| 6. | "Interlude" | 3:09 |
| 7. | "No Apologies" | 3:20 |
| 8. | "Last Days in August" | 2:42 |
| 9. | "Silver Medal" | 3:40 |
| 10. | "Aisle #10" | 3:24 |
| 11. | "R.E.C." | 4:42 |
| 12. | "Parade of Legs" | 2:59 |
| Total length: | | 43:54 |

== Critical reception ==
Elana Childers, writing for BTR Today described her reluctance to even listen to the album. Childers initially said "I was reluctant to up the click count of a band accused of such disturbing behavior, but as a music journalist, I was obligated to press play." Childers further said that the album is a slower, emotional, more intricate album than their previous work, but concluded .
