= The Orwells =

American rock band

- The Orwells performing at Pointfest 2014

Background information
- Origin: Elmhurst, Illinois, United States
- Genres: Punk rock, garage rock revival, garage punk, indie rock
- Years active: 2009–2018, 2023–present
- Labels: Atlantic, Autumn Tone, Canvasback Music
- Members: Mario Cuomo; Dominic Corso; Grant Brinner; Henry Brinner
- Past members: Matt O'Keefe
- Website: theorwells.com

The Orwells are an American rock band from Elmhurst, a suburb west of Chicago, Illinois, United States. The members include Mario Cuomo (vocals), Dominic Corso (guitar), Grant Brinner (bass), and Henry Brinner (drums). Their debut album Remember When was released in August 2012. The band is known for their song "Who Needs You", which was performed on the Late Show with David Letterman and was featured in the 2013 video game Grand Theft Auto V and Apple commercial for the iPad Air 2.

== History ==
=== Remember When ===
The Orwells formed when all the members attended York High School in Elmhurst, Illinois. The band was discovered in late 2011 by Aquarium Drunkard blogger Justin Gage, who signed them to his Autumn Tone label imprint. They graduated high school early in 2013 to pursue their musical career.

The Orwells were named as one of the overlooked artists of 2012 in MTV's annual list. Their single "Mallrats (La La La)" was also reviewed by music website Pitchfork. They performed at Lollapalooza in August 2013. On November 5, 2013, The Orwells appeared on Later... with Jools Holland. On November 22, 2013, Arctic Monkeys announced that The Orwells would be their support at nine American concerts in January and February 2014.

=== Disgraceland and Terrible Human Beings ===
On March 24, 2014, The Orwells announced their new studio album Disgraceland through social media outlets. The album was released on June 3, 2014, and includes singles such as "Who Needs You" and "Dirty Sheets".

The song "Who Needs You" was featured on the August 6, 2013, episode of NPR's All Songs Considered. Co-host Bob Boilen said "You can't say The Orwells without saying 'young'" and called the song his summer anthem.

The Orwells performed on Late Show with David Letterman January 15, 2014. Their performance was enthusiastically received, so much that Letterman and others called for an encore. The band did not respond, partly because guitarist Matt O'Keefe had broken all of his strings and physically could not play. After waiting for the Orwells, the house band reprised the Orwells' song and Paul Shaffer parodied the way that Mario Cuomo had lain on his back, thrashing.

On September 25, 2014, the band was featured on an episode of Adam Devine's House Party, performing their single "Who Needs You".

On December 7, 2014, the prospering note "Who Needs You" was found in an Apple Inc. commercial for the iPad Air 2, "Change is in the Air." This track was also to be later found in a Rockstar Games video game, "Grand Theft Auto V" on the Indie Rock station, "Vinewood Boulevard Radio".

The Orwells' third album Terrible Human Beings was released on February 17, 2017, containing the singles "Buddy" and "They Put a Body in the Bayou". The album's title was chosen because according to band members, "back in Chicago, we do not have the best reputation around town" and "we're not the most liked boys on the block, for whatever reason that might be."

=== Accusations of sexual abuse and disbandment ===
On August 29, 2018, the Orwells announced that they had disbanded. In the days prior, sexual abuse allegations had been raised on Reddit and Twitter against Cuomo and the Brinner brothers. The range of allegations include rape, statutory rape, and sending unsolicited nude photos. The Orwells issued a statement to Paste magazine denying the claims. On September 10, 2018, Consequence of Sound published a series of allegations made by nine women who accused members of the band of serious instances of sexual abuse. One accusation claimed that "The Orwells’ abuse was not only a well-known scene secret, but it was something that happened to so many women WITHIN the scene."

=== Post-split and fourth album ===
On June 15, 2019, Mario Cuomo released the self-titled fourth studio album by The Orwells onto his YouTube channel, with a statement reading "Hey everybody. I could not wait any longer for this record to be heard. Sorry it has taken so long but it would have taken even longer if I didn’t make the decision to self release this album. Self recorded, self titled, self released. The Orwells." The album's cover is blank and contains just the band's name and text reading "We had an album cover we wanted to use, but after getting dropped by our label we can no longer afford to use it. So instead you can stare at this blank square."

=== Reunion ===
On March 1, 2023, the Orwells announced their return with the double single "Bar Fly / Friendly Fire". The band released a statement saying "Almost five years ago, we were falsely accused of inappropriate conduct by a group of people we had never met. Their untrue but sensational rumors led us to take a break to address the situation. We saw no choice but to take legal action and filed a business tort and defamation suit. We are satisfied with the progress in our case and will keep you posted."

== Musical influence ==
Several band members have expressed a love for the Supremes in interviews.

The lead singer, Mario Cuomo, is heavily influenced by six distinctly different performers; Iggy Pop, Jay Reatard, Julian Casablancas, Cole Alexander and Jared Swilley of the Black Lips, Pelle Almqvist of the Hives, and Tyler, The Creator—particularly Tyler's talk about skipping class, disobeying parents, and going to record. Mario is quoted saying that, "It like spoke to me even more than any other music I was listening to. I think if it wasn’t for him, I probably wouldn’t have had the balls to drop out or even be in a band."

== Band members ==
- Mario Cuomo – vocals (2009–2018, 2023–present)
- Dominic Corso – guitar, backing vocals (2009–2018, 2023–present)
- Matt O'Keefe – guitar, backing vocals (2009–2018)
- Grant Brinner – bass guitar (2009–2018, 2023–present)
- Henry Brinner – drums (2009–2018, 2023–present)
- Caleb Tucker – guitar (2023–present)

== Discography ==
=== Studio albums ===
| Title | Album details |
|---|---|
| Remember When | Released: August 7, 2012; Label: Autumn Tone Records; Formats: 12" vinyl, Compact Disc, digital download |
| Disgraceland | Released: June 3, 2014; Label: Canvasback/Atlantic; Formats: 12" vinyl, Compact Disc, digital download |
| Terrible Human Beings | Released: February 17, 2017; Label: Canvasback/Atlantic; Formats: 12" vinyl, Compact Disc, digital download |
| The Orwells | Released: June 15, 2019; Label: Self-released; Formats: 12" vinyl, digital download |
| Friendly Fire | Released: December 25, 2023; Label: Self-released; Formats: 12" vinyl, digital download |

=== Extended plays ===
| Title | Album details |
|---|---|
| Other Voices | Released: June 30, 2013; Label: National Anthem (ANTHEM0011); Formats: 10" vinyl, digital download |
| Who Needs You | Released: September 10, 2013; Label: National Anthem (ANTHEM0013); Formats: 10" vinyl, digital download |

=== Other releases ===
- Head Ep (2010) [unofficial]
- Head Lp (2010) [unofficial]
- Oh! Well (2011) [unofficial]
