= The Smoking Flowers =

US musical duo

- Origin: Nashville, TN, United States
- Genres: Rock, Americana
- Labels: Bandaloop Music
- Members: Scott Collins; Kim Collins

The Smoking Flowers are a rock duo from Nashville, Tennessee composed of husband and wife Scott and Kim Collins. Their style incorporates stylings from roots, alt-country, punk, and folk. The Repertoire says "There are not enough words to describe the intrinsic chemistry Kim and Scott Collins possess. The duo, better known as The Smoking Flowers, have discovered what some duos spend their entire careers trying to find: a fascinating marriage between artistic talent and subtle sensuality that pierces the attention of anyone in the same room as them. The Collins' have devoted their entire lives to music, and the second their wild feet touch the stage they exude just how tenured they truly are."

Kim and Scott are both vocalists and multi-instrumentalists. In any given show, vocalist Kim will play accordion, drums, mandolin, harmonica, tambourine and guitar, while Scott plays lead guitar, harmonica and sings. Maverick Magazine calls them "a duo unafraid to take fascinating, artistic risks." Their sound encompasses a wide range; they have been described as everywhere from "often beautifully ragged; sometimes beautifully haunting; many times beautifully goofy-grinned and/or playful, pleading, and pledging – but always beautiful" to "a punkish/alt-country/whatever-you-need-it-to-be masterpiece."

== Career ==
The Smoking Flowers have released three full-length albums of original music, one EP featuring covers, and one single of an original Christmas song. Their third album, Let's Die Together was described by New Noise as "This is an album that has a unique ability to fuse loud, thriving '90s rock guitars with a vintage feeling akin to their Nashville home. While some would call what the husband and wife team have chemistry, on this phenomenal album it seems pretty close to magic." No Depression declared “These songs are so powerful they could blow the roof off of Bridgestone Arena.” Let's Die Together also received positive reviews from Blitz, The Rock & Roll Report, Nashville Arts Magazine, and The Vinyl Anachronist, saying "Let's Die Together proudly declares that The Smoking Flowers are still here, and they're kicking more ass than ever before. Instead of just being a talented singer-songwriter duo, they are now something more - true artists who have a confident sound and attitude that comes from years and years of putting everything into their music, flesh and blood and a river of tears that carries it all downstream.” A music video for the song "Young & Brave" from Let's Die Together premiered on Paste, with Paste saying The Smoking Flowers "will make a standout addition to any collection. Sure to melt any heart.”

Their second album, 2 Guns, has been described by Billboard's Allmusic Guide as "a remarkably strong and inspired album, taking cues from past masters but rooted in their own stories and personal flair." 2 Guns also received positive reviews from The Nashville Scene, Pop Matters, and The Vinyl Anachronist, saying "it's rare that an album captures this kind of unabashed emotion without resorting to hip distancing devices or a wall of sound." The song "Something I Said" from their sophomore album 2 Guns was licensed in ABC's hit show Revenge. A music video for the song premiered on American Songwriter and was directed by Allen Clark, famed photographer of Julian Assange.

Their debut album, Sweet As Port, was described by AltCountry.NL as "Kim and Scott Collins carry on the torch where Gram Parsons and Emmylou Harris left off in their day, delivering beautifully produced, sometimes moody, songs with knockout harmonies... A marriage of song and voice that is uniquely their own."

Since forming their own label in 2009, The Smoking Flowers have toured consistently, at times performing over 100 shows a year all across the United States, Canada, Australia and Japan. Their live show has a reputation for high energy, intimacy and sensuality, Pop Matters calling them "provocative and risky." Skip Anderson, writer for The Nashville Scene, says “The Smoking Flowers write inspired songs of substance about life, death, and everything in between. Their albums are consistently outstanding. And, better still, their live shows aren't to be missed. I stand amazed that all that music comes from just two people. Their music drips in their love for each other and their thirsty lust for life.”

They met in the summer of 1998, while Scott was visiting his brother in Nashville. Kim was managing the infamous Nashville music venue 12th & Porter and Scott walked in looking for a job. Six months later, the couple was engaged. They have been married for 19 years and have made their home in East Nashville. They are both activists and advocates for holistic and alternative medicine and healing techniques. Kim was diagnosed with breast cancer in 2012 and healed the dis-ease with holistic and alternative methods only.

== Discography ==
- Sweet As Port (2009) Bandaloop Music
- 2 Guns (2013) Bandaloop Music
- A Bow and Nothing More (2013) Bandaloop Music
- 1985 (2014) Bandaloop Music
- Let's Die Together (2018) Bandaloop Music
