= Consentual Selections =

Greatest hits album by Mad Caddies
- Released: July 20, 2010
- Genre: Ska punk Alternative rock Pop punk Reggae
- Label: Fat Wreck Chords
- Producer: Ryan Greene

Mad Caddies chronology
Keep It Going (2007)	Consentual Selections (2010)	Dirty Rice (2014)

Professional ratings
Review scores
Source	Rating
Ox-Fanzine	4/5 stars

Consentual Selections is the first best of album by California ska punk band Mad Caddies, released on July 20, 2010.

== Track listing ==
1. "Backyard" - 3:02 (from Keep It Going, 2007)
2. "Leavin" - 2:59 (from Just One More, 2003)
3. "No Hope" - 1:28 (from Duck and Cover, 1998)
4. "Drinking For 11" - 3:54 (from Just One More)
5. "Mary Melody" - 3:08 (from Rock the Plank, 2001)
6. "State Of Mind" - 3:47 (from Keep it Going)
7. "Falling Down" - 3:10 (from The Holiday Has Been Cancelled, 2000)
8. "Just One More" - 3:26 (from Just One More)
9. "The Bell Tower" - 2:41 (from Quality Soft Core, 1997)
10. "Monkeys" - 2:46 (from Duck and Cover)
11. "Days Away" - 3:44 (from Rock the Plank)
12. "Silence" - 2:47 (from Just One More)
13. "Road Rash" - 1:57 (from Duck and Cover)
14. "Whatcha Gonna Do" - 3:09 (from Keep it Going)
15. "All American Badass" - 2:28 (from Rock the Plank)
16. "Reflections" - 3:14 (from Keep it Going)
17. "The Gentleman" - 2:17 (from Duck and Cover)
18. "Last Breath" - 3:21 (from Just One More)
19. "Popcorn" - 3:48 (from Duck and Cover)
20. "Tired Bones" - 2:53 (from Keep it Going)
21. "Preppie Girl" - 2:35 (from Quality Soft Core)
22. "Weird Beard" - 2:42 (from Rock the Plank)
23. "Save Us" - 2:19 (previously unreleased)
24. "Why Must I Wait" - 4:01 (previously unreleased)
