= I Love American Music =

Single by Cherry Poppin' Daddies

from the album White Teeth, Black Thoughts
- Released: May 20, 2013
- Recorded: 2011–2012
- Genre: Swing
- Length: 3:46
- Label: Space Age Bachelor Pad
- Songwriter(s): Steve Perry
- Producer(s): Steve Perry

Cherry Poppin' Daddies singles chronology
"Diamond Light Boogie" (2000)	"I Love American Music" (2013)	"Gym Rat" (2019)

"I Love American Music" is a song by American swing-ska band the Cherry Poppin' Daddies, released as the first and only single off their 2013 studio album White Teeth, Black Thoughts. Released digitally on May 20, 2013, "I Love American Music" marked the Daddies' first single since "Diamond Light Boogie" in 2000.

== Overview ==
=== Music and lyrics ===
Following the predominant Latin and ska influences of their 2008 album Susquehanna, White Teeth, Black Thoughts marked the first Daddies album since their hit 1997 compilation Zoot Suit Riot to consist entirely of jazz and swing music. As such, "I Love American Music" follows in the jump blues-influenced swing style as much of the album does, punctuated by the Daddies' trademark horn section and utilizing call and response vocalizations in the chorus.

Perry has described "I Love American Music" as being a dedication to the fans and musicians of American roots music, particularly influenced by the figures of Eugene, Oregon's blues scene in the 1980s, such as Robert Cray, Henry Vestine and Curtis Salgado. In a blog post written on the day of the single's release, Perry elaborated "I think what touches me the most in retrospect [about the blues scene] were the kind of minor players who were nonetheless freaking fantastic and for one reason or another never got the notoriety.[...]These guys lived in squalor, in 1 room crash pads, in order to be able to do what they did, while their friends and relations went off to sell insurance, program computers, and generally take a shot at what they felt was the American dream. Unfortunately, this country does not value its cultural heritage, (its real dream) and mostly isn't even aware of its glorious history or the lives of their soulful poets. These poor bastards mostly go to their deaths unknown. Many I was fortunate to call my friends. So I wrote a little song for them".

The song's chorus begins with the phrase "Play it again, Sam", a popular misquotation from the 1942 film Casablanca.

=== Release and reception ===
On May 15, 2013, "I Love American Music" was premiered on The Onion's A.V. Club along with its music video, while the song was released to iTunes and Spotify as a digital single on May 20. On July 25, 2013, in the midst of a brief national tour supporting White Teeth, Black Thoughts, the Daddies appeared on the Fox-owned KTTV program Good Day L.A. where they performed a shortened version of "I Love American Music".

Critical reception for White Teeth, Black Thoughts was generally positive, with some reviews highlighting "I Love American Music" as a standout track. Matt Collar of AllMusic referred to the "bluesy" song as among the album's more "compelling" tracks, while C-Ville Weekly positively described it as a "semi-sequel to 'Zoot Suit Riot'", noting "there is fun to be had here". Mitch Keiffer of Pop 'Stache, praising White Teeth as the Daddies' most "beautifully recorded" and "polished" album to date, wrote of "I Love American Music" as "a fun, vintage song" which "[covered] the most beloved aspects of the old Swing music the band is influenced by" as a "love song about American music".

== Music video ==
"I Love American Music" was the first of five music videos the Daddies shot for White Teeth, Black Thoughts with the Bend, Oregon-based video production company AMZ Productions, marking the first music video the band had shot since "Brown Derby Jump" for Zoot Suit Riot in 1998.

Directed by Steve Perry and Jesse Locke, the video humorously depicts Perry as himself, intently composing and singing along to the song while his frustrated wife – played by his real-life wife Yvette – stands to the sidelines. Perry credited the concept of the video to Yvette Perry, examining the song through another angle in how the dedication to the life of an artist affects his or her family. "Being a writer is a solitary job that never ends and steals away time from the people that you love", Perry wrote in a blog post, "It's a Sisyphean struggle often with more downs than ups. We wanted to show that tension between being a member of a band and the family, and ultimately the love and understanding that needs to be there for anything at all triumphant to get played".

== Personnel ==
Cherry Poppin' Daddies

- Steve Perry – vocals
- Dana Heitman – trumpet
- Joe Manis – alto saxophone
- Kevin Congleton – drums
- Willie Matheis – tenor saxophone
- Bill Marsh – lead guitar
- Joe Freuen – trombone

Additional musicians

- Dustin Lanker – keyboards
- Dave Captein – bass

=== Production ===
- Produced by Steve Perry
- Recorded and mixed by Bill Barnett at Gung Ho Studio, Eugene, Oregon
