= Lanker =

Lanker may refer to:

- Brian Lanker, American photographer
- Dustin Lanker, American keyboardist
- Lanker See, German lake
- Chris Lanker, American Businessman
