= White Teeth, Black Thoughts =

Studio album by Cherry Poppin' Daddies
- Released: July 16, 2013; May 5, 2014 (Europe)
- Recorded: 2011–2012 at Gung Ho Studios in Eugene, Oregon
- Genre: Swing
- Length: 35:34; 66:21 (deluxe edition)
- Labels: Space Age Bachelor Pad; People Like You (Europe)
- Producer: Steve Perry

Cherry Poppin' Daddies chronology
Skaboy JFK (2009)	White Teeth, Black Thoughts (2013)	Please Return the Evening (2014)

Alternate album covers
- Alternate artwork

Singles from White Teeth, Black Thoughts
- 1. "I Love American Music" Released: May 20, 2013

White Teeth, Black Thoughts is the sixth studio album by American band the Cherry Poppin' Daddies, released on July 16, 2013, on Space Age Bachelor Pad Records.

Following the predominant world music slant of 2008's Susquehanna and the 2009 ska album Skaboy JFK, White Teeth, Black Thoughts marks the Cherry Poppin' Daddies' first album since their 1997 compilation Zoot Suit Riot to focus exclusively on swing and jazz music, eschewing the ska, rock and pop influences which typically feature on their albums.

A two-disc "deluxe" version of White Teeth, Black Thoughts was released concurrently with the main swing album, featuring an additional full-length album of material composed in an "Americana" vein covering rockabilly, country and western swing.

== Album overview ==
=== Music ===
Since plans for a new record were announced, singer/songwriter Steve Perry stated the primary musical direction of the next Daddies album would be returning to swing and jazz music, the band's first swing-oriented album since their 1997 breakthrough compilation Zoot Suit Riot. White Teeth, Black Thoughts features few of the ska and punk influences which the Daddies are generally recognized for incorporating into their swing music, instead primarily drawing from various periods of traditional jazz and swing, including the hot jazz of the 1930s and the jump blues and big band of the 1940s and 1950s.

A limited "deluxe edition" of White Teeth, Black Thoughts was co-released alongside the main album, featuring a bonus disc of additional material which Perry explained didn't fit into the stylistic context of the swing album. Heavily influenced by various facets of Americana music, the songs on the bonus disc cover such styles as zydeco ("Tchoupitoulas Congregation"), country ("You Wiped Your Ass With My Heart"), western swing ("Peckerheads & Badasses") and bluegrass ("Ragged Ol' Flag"), as well as several songs influenced by rockabilly. Elaborating on the band's interpretation of the latter, Perry explained "[it's] kind of like psychobilly with horns...[i]t's like the swing stuff we deal with, it's a little straighter, but with still a swung beat and then some heavy guitar and some R&B and swing elements in there".

White Teeth, Black Thoughts is the first Daddies studio album since 1994's Rapid City Muscle Car to include cover songs, and the first time the band has recorded songs from the swing era. While Perry has long been a critic of cover songs and in particular the overuse of covers in swing bands, he explained in an interview, "If we do a cover...we do it because we believe people won't recognize it rather than will. I would want to draw attention to an artist that is historically out there on the cobblestones". The main album features covers of Louis Jordan's 1939 song "Doug the Jitterbug", Wynonie Harris's 1950 rhythm and blues version of Hank Penny's "Bloodshot Eyes" and Bull Moose Jackson's 1947 "I Want a Bowlegged Woman", while the bonus disc includes a French-language cover of Django Reinhardt's "Nuages" and a cover of "Flat Butts and Beer Guts (Or How I Learned to Vomit Standing Up)" by New York cowpunk band the Barnyard Playboys, from their 2000 album Dumbass on a Rampage.

=== Lyricism ===
In a June 2013 interview with Parade magazine, Perry briefly mentioned that he was inspired to start writing material for White Teeth, Black Thoughts during the Great Recession, drawing a parallel with the Great Depression of the 1930s which prompted him to return to writing swing and jazz music. In a later interview, Perry elaborated on these influences, calling the album "an Americana examination of those Bush into Obama years and financial hard times", focusing on an amalgam of the social and political issues of the time, including "Red State anxiety (i.e. Tea Party/Fox News phenomenon), growing class warfare (i.e. Wall Street/hedge fund), American materialist/capitalist values [and] the pain of nostalgia. I guess I wanted little vignettes and character sketches that would freeze this time period in amber, so to speak".

== Production history ==
In a July 2010 interview conducted while the Daddies were still touring behind the release of Skaboy JFK, Perry hinted at prospective plans for new Cherry Poppin' Daddies material, mentioning the band was in the process of writing music for possibly two new albums, one "a swing-rockabilly kind of thing" and the other "an R&B...pop thing". By the following January, however, Perry clarified that the swing album had become the band's sole focus, though elements of the R&B project would eventually contribute to the development of White Teeth, Black Thoughts' bonus disc.

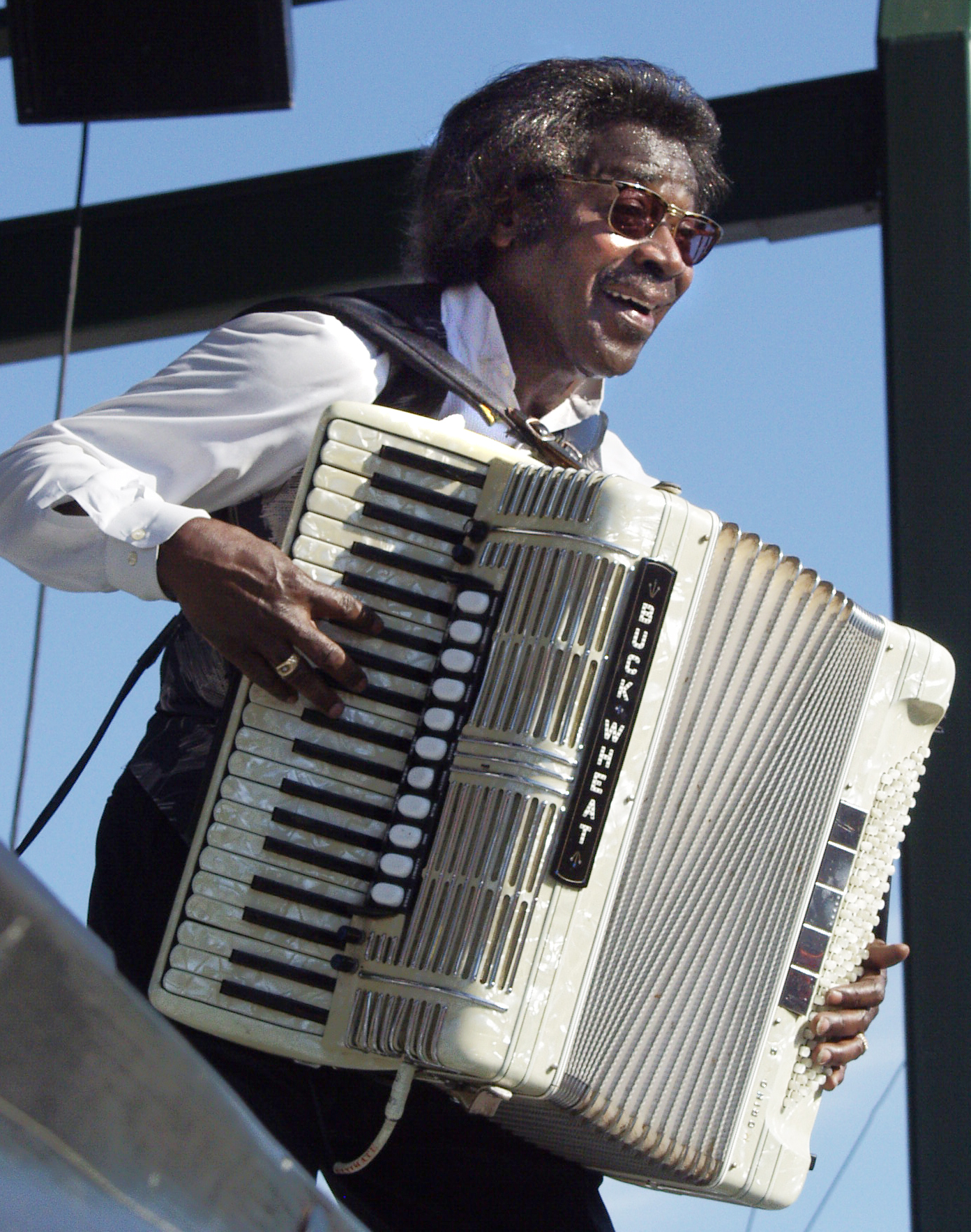
Buckwheat Zydeco was one of several guest musicians appearing on White Teeth, Black Thoughts.

Initial production on the album began in March 2011 at Gung Ho Studios in the Daddies' hometown of Eugene, Oregon, where all of the band's previous studio albums have been recorded. Documented through Perry's personal Twitter account, this stage of production lasted throughout most of 2011, with recording lasting into summer, tracking finished by October and mixing taking place over the following months. These recording sessions marked the debuts of guitarist Bill Marsh and tenor saxophonist Willie Matheis, both of whom joined the Daddies in 2010, as well as trombonist Joe Freuen, who would later join the band in 2012 as their first full-time trombone player. This would also be the final Daddies album to feature longtime keyboardist Dustin Lanker, who would leave the band in early 2012.

Much like Susquehanna, White Teeth, Black Thoughts features an extensive roster of guest musicians, primarily contributing instruments unique to the genres being performed. Most notably, the album features appearances by Grammy Award-winning accordionist Buckwheat Zydeco on the zydeco-styled song "Tchoupitoulas Congregation", and Captain Beefheart and The Magic Band guitarist Zoot Horn Rollo, a Eugene resident and personal friend of Perry's, on the psychobilly cover "Flat Butts and Beer Guts". John Fohl, a former member of Dr. John's Lower 911 band and Daddies guitarist from 1990 to 1992, provided baritone and slide guitar for the western swing track "Peckerheads and Badasses".

Although the band originally announced a projected release date of winter 2011, updates on the album's development went entirely unheard of until a December 2011 interview with Perry, where he vaguely mentioned continued work on the album but finally confirmed its title, White Teeth, Black Thoughts. Perry later revealed that following initial completion of recording in late 2011, the band ultimately decided to record an additional batch of songs and release an exclusive version of White Teeth, Black Thoughts as a double album. According to Perry, he had simply written "so many damn songs" in both the swing and rockabilly/Americana genres that he thought it better to split them into two separate albums rather than attempt to merge the two styles into something stylistically cohesive.

On June 20, 2012, the Daddies launched a PledgeMusic campaign accepting fan donations to help complete the final stages of production, reaching 100% on August 14 and continuing to collect further donations into 2013, ultimately raising 133% of its target sum. Perry announced through a PledgeMusic update on November 16, 2012, that the album and its artwork had been completely finished.

== Release and promotion ==
On March 18, 2013, a digital download of the 11-track swing album was released exclusively for contributors to the Daddies' PledgeMusic campaign, while signed physical copies of the single and double-disc CDs were mailed out in the following weeks. The Daddies eventually confirmed a wide release date of July 16 for both versions of White Teeth, Black Thoughts in April, releasing the album's first single and video, "I Love American Music", on May 15, and the second, "The Babooch", on July 2. On July 8, Billboard released a full stream of the swing album on their website. Both CD versions of the album were released on July 16 along with a limited vinyl release of the swing album, the first Daddies album since 1990's Ferociously Stoned to be issued on vinyl.

Having retired from full-time touring after their hiatus in late 2000, the Daddies carried out a short fifteen-city tour in support of White Teeth, Black Thoughts, primarily playing within the West Coast and New England. In the midst of the tour on July 25, the band appeared on the Fox-owned KTTV program Good Day L.A., performing the song "I Love American Music" in promotion of their show at the Roxy Theatre in Hollywood that same evening.

=== Music videos ===
Five music videos were filmed in promotion of White Teeth, Black Thoughts, shot by Steve Perry and the Daddies in conjunction with the Bend, Oregon-based production company AMZ Productions.

"I Love American Music", the first single/video off the album, was premiered on The Onion's A.V. Club website on May 15, 2013, while the song was released to iTunes and Spotify on May 20. In a blog post released the same day, Perry elaborated at length behind the song and the video, noting that it was written as a tribute to the unknown blues musicians he idolized who remained dedicated to their music despite living in poverty and obscurity, while the video reflects how the same dedication affects an musician's family life, describing it as "a Sisyphean struggle with more downs than ups". The video, directed by Perry and Jesse Locke, humorously depicts Perry at his home, intently composing and singing along to the song while his frustrated wife stands to the sidelines.

On July 2, the album's second video, "The Babooch", was premiered on USA Today. Again directed by Perry and Locke, the video had a decidedly political tone, featuring the Daddies performing the song while super-imposed over a montage of postcards and stock film, intercut with footage of bourgeoisie luxury and figures including Henry Paulson, Donald Trump and Mitt Romney with news footage of Occupy Wall Street and American homelessness. Perry described the video as being inspired by "punk rock clip posters", Frank Zappa's 200 Motels and Luis Buñuel's The Discreet Charm of the Bourgeoisie, while noting the song was about a Gatsby-esque "one-percenter self-importantly celebrating his success", "the most American character, seduced by luxury but pricked by conscience".

The album's third music video, "Huffin' Muggles", debuted on the website for gay and lesbian magazine Out on August 27, 2013. Depicting Perry dressed in drag and several members of Eugene, Oregon's drag community, Perry described the song as an homage to the Warhol superstars, namely Candy Darling, Jackie Curtis and Holly Woodlawn, as well as actress Maria Montez and the filmmaking style of experimental director Kenneth Anger. In addition to "huffing muggles" being 1930s/1940s slang for smoking marijuana, Perry elaborated on the meaning of the song by calling it "like an ear to the door of a casual conversation between an old experienced 'urbane' male and his younger acolytes with whom he is holding court. There is a lot of shit talking going on, and everyone is 'getting loose'", highlighting the lyrical references to William Blake's Songs of Innocence and of Experience and noting "[w]hat I was really interested in here was the kind of cultural apprenticeship angle, and the bittersweet generosity behind the transferring of hard won cultural knowledge".

On April 25, 2014, a week before the May 2 European release of White Teeth, Black Thoughts, the Daddies released their fourth video for "Doug the Jitterbug", a cover of a 1939 Louis Jordan song. Unlike the album's previous videos, "Doug the Jitterbug" didn't feature a narrative, but was instead a filmed live performance in black-and-white of the Daddies performing the song at the Whiteside Theatre in Corvallis, Oregon on September 21, 2012, occasionally interspersed with clips of vintage films and cartoons.

On October 20, 2015, over two years after the album's release, Perry posted a music video for the song "Brown Flight Jacket" to the band's YouTube account. In a Facebook post, Perry revealed the video was shot the same day as the video for "The Babooch", but "[he] forgot to put it out there for the world to enjoy". Similar in aesthetic style to "The Babooch", the video depicts Perry wandering across a desert landscape singing the song, intercut with vintage footage of World War II bombers.

== Reception ==
Professional ratings
Review scores
Source	Rating
Allmusic	3.5/5 stars
PopMatters	7/10

Critical response to White Teeth, Black Thoughts was generally favorable, though, like Susquehanna five years prior, the album's independent release and distribution flew under the radar of most major music publications. PopMatters gave the album a 7 out of 10 rating, considering it to be a superior effort over Zoot Suit Riot, complimenting the band's "bizarre/twisted/out of left field sense of humor" and agility at "slinky, slow-burning numbers" such as the title track, though criticized parts of the album they felt steered too close to the sounds of other contemporary swing bands like Big Bad Voodoo Daddy. Pop'stache contributed a glowing review, calling it "beautifully recorded" and the Daddies' "most mature and polished release to date", praising their "unconventional lyrics, bouncy guitars, and some strange drums" in making a "contemporary twist on a classic style". The Washington Post also gave a positive review, though expressed mixed feelings over the Daddies' "modern spin" on swing music, writing that most of the songs sounded like "contemporary bar-rock songs in a swing style than the work of a retro act", though highly praised songs such as "Brown Flight Jacket" for the "tender" lyricism and level of subtlety for what the reviewer considered "a group that has never seemed to grow out of its bawdy lyrics and rambunctious style". Cityview offered a more indifferent opinion, calling the album "a solid, well-developed piece of music" which was "more mature and nuanced than maybe anything the band has previously released", though noted that it felt like an "album out of time" and it was "hard to shake the feeling that it's come about a decade too late". In a brief 2014 review, Matt Collar of Allmusic rated the album with 3.5 out of 5 stars, summarizing it as "an album of exuberant, urbane dance music that moves from popular standards to new compositions with devilish ease".

Of the few publications to review the double-disc deluxe edition, Ink 19 called the second disc "more experimental and generally more fun than the first", though recommended both discs as featuring worthwhile material, singling out the "touching" "Brown Flight Jacket" and the "fun to sing along with" "Flat Butts and Beer Guts". ReadJunk called the album "a great swing-influenced album", describing the first disc as containing "some pretty good swing songs", but urged readers to pick up the deluxe version, writing "[y]ou'll be missing out an entire disc of great songs if you don't".

== Track listing ==
White Teeth, Black Thoughts
No.	Title	Writer(s)	Length
1.	"The Babooch"	Steve Perry	3:57
2.	"I Love American Music"	Perry	3:47
3.	"Whiskey Jack"	Perry	3:22
4.	"Doug the Jitterbug"	Louis Jordan	2:30
5.	"White Teeth, Black Thoughts"	Perry	3:26
6.	"Brown Flight Jacket"	Perry	4:07
7.	"Bloodshot Eyes"	Hank Penny, Ruth Hall	2:31
8.	"Jake's Frilly Panties"	Perry	2:46
9.	"Huffin' Muggles"	Perry	3:18
10.	"I Want a Bowlegged Woman"	Sally Nix, Henry Glover	2:50
11.	"Concrete Man Blues"	Perry	5:00
Total length:			35:34

Deluxe edition bonus disc
No.	Title	Writer(s)	Length
1.	"Tchoupitoulas Congregation" (featuring Buckwheat Zydeco)	Steve Perry	3:21
2.	"You Wiped Your Ass With My Heart"	Perry	2:41
3.	"Peckerheads and Badasses"	Perry	3:26
4.	"Throwback Man"	Perry	3:21
5.	"Subway Killer"	Perry	3:08
6.	"Flat Butts and Beer Guts" (featuring Zoot Horn Rollo)	Barnyard Playboys	2:14
7.	"Platform Shoes"	Perry	3:08
8.	"Ragged Ol' Flag"	Perry	3:00
9.	"Nuages"	Django Reinhardt, Jacque Larue	3:52
10.	"The Babooch (Director's Cut)"	Perry	3:56
Total length:			30:47

=== Previous availability ===
- "Jake's Frilly Panties" is an outtake from the Soul Caddy recording sessions, previously released as a fan club download on the Daddies' website in 2001. The White Teeth version adds a low fidelity crackle effect to replicate the sound of 78 RPM vinyl.
- "Subway Killer" is a re-recording of a song by Steve Perry's glam rock band White Hot Odyssey, originally from their 2004 self-titled album.
- "The Babooch (Director's Cut)" is the same recording as featured on disc one, except with an alternate set of explicit lyrics in the chorus.

== Personnel ==
Cherry Poppin' Daddies

- Steve Perry – vocals, guitar, washboard
- Dan Schmid – bass
- Dana Heitman – trumpet
- Joe Manis – alto sax
- Kevin Congleton – drums
- Willie Matheis – tenor saxophone
- Bill Marsh – lead guitar
- Joe Freuen – trombone

Additional musicians

- Dustin Lanker – keyboards on tracks 1–5, 8–10
- Reinhardt Melz – drums on tracks 6
- Jason Palmer – drums on track 11
- Dave Captein – bass on tracks 1, 2, 5, 9
- Cassio Vianna – keyboards on track 11
- Greg Goebel – keyboards on track 6
- Tim Donahue – drums on track 8
- Jason Moss – guitar on track 8

Additional musicians on deluxe edition bonus disc

- Zoot Horn Rollo – guitar on track 6
- Buckwheat Zydeco – accordion, background vocals on track 1
- Dustin Lanker – keyboards on tracks 1, 12
- Bill Barnett – bass, drums, guitar on tracks 1–3
- John Fohl – baritone guitar, slide guitar on track 3
- Joe Weber – guitar on track 4
- Monti Admundson – guitar on track 5
- Paul Brainard – lap steel, Dobro on tracks 2–3, 8
- Reinhardt Melz – drums on track 7
- Jason Palmer – drums on track 1
- Allen Hunter – bass on track 5
- Dave Captein – bass on tracks 3, 10
- Sean Shanahan – banjo on track 8
- Thomas "Johnny" Schiller – background vocals on track 8
- Cassio Vianna – keyboards, melodica on track 9
- Greg Goebel – keyboards on track 7

Production

- Produced by Steve Perry
- Recorded and mixed by Bill Barnett at Gung Ho Studio, Eugene, Oregon
- Mastered by Brad Blackwood at Euphonic Mastering, Memphis, Tennessee
