= Latin Grammy Award for Best Arrangement =

Yearly award granted to Latin music arranger at Latin Grammy Awards

- Awarded for: arrangements including instruments and vocals, instrumentals, and a Capella
- Country: United States
- Presented by: The Latin Recording Academy
- First award: 2018
- Currently held by: Cesar Orozco for "Camaleón" (2025)
- Website: latingrammy.com

The Latin Grammy Award for Best Arrangement is an honor presented annually at the Latin Grammy Awards, a ceremony that recognizes excellence and promotes awareness of cultural diversity and contributions of Latin recording artists in the United States and internationally.

It was first awarded at the 19th Annual Latin Grammy Awards in 2018 with Colombian pianist and composer Milton Salcedo being the first recipient of the award for "Se Le Ve", performed by himself alongside Amaury Gutiérrez, Carlos Oliva and Michel Puche, with colombian singer Andres Buitrago as vocal coach and director.

The award goes to the arranger(s). An arranger should not be entered more than twice in the Best Arrangement category, whether for instrumental or vocal arrangement (a Capella) included, if the artist is the same.

== Recipients ==
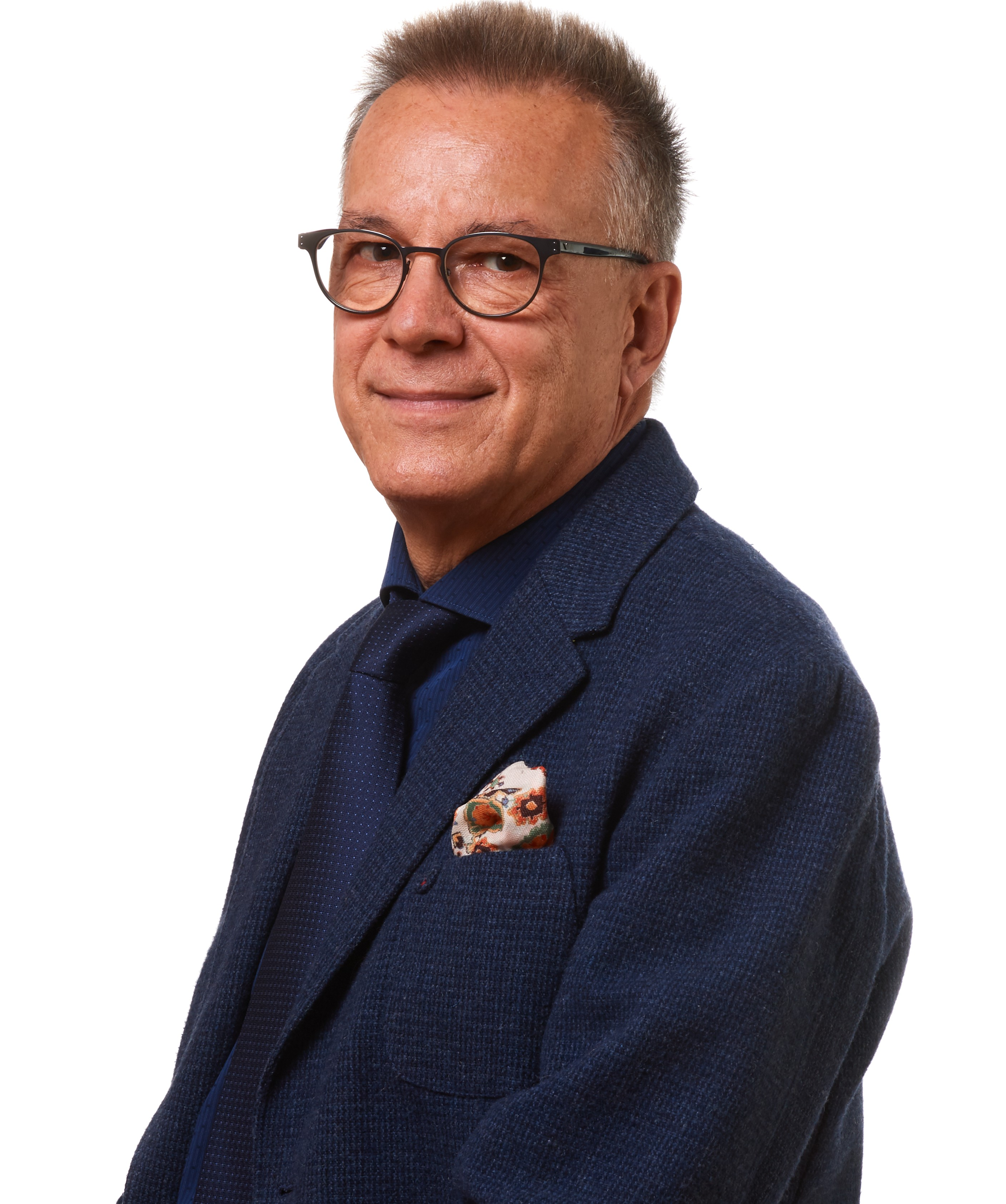
2020 winner Lorenzo Ferrero.

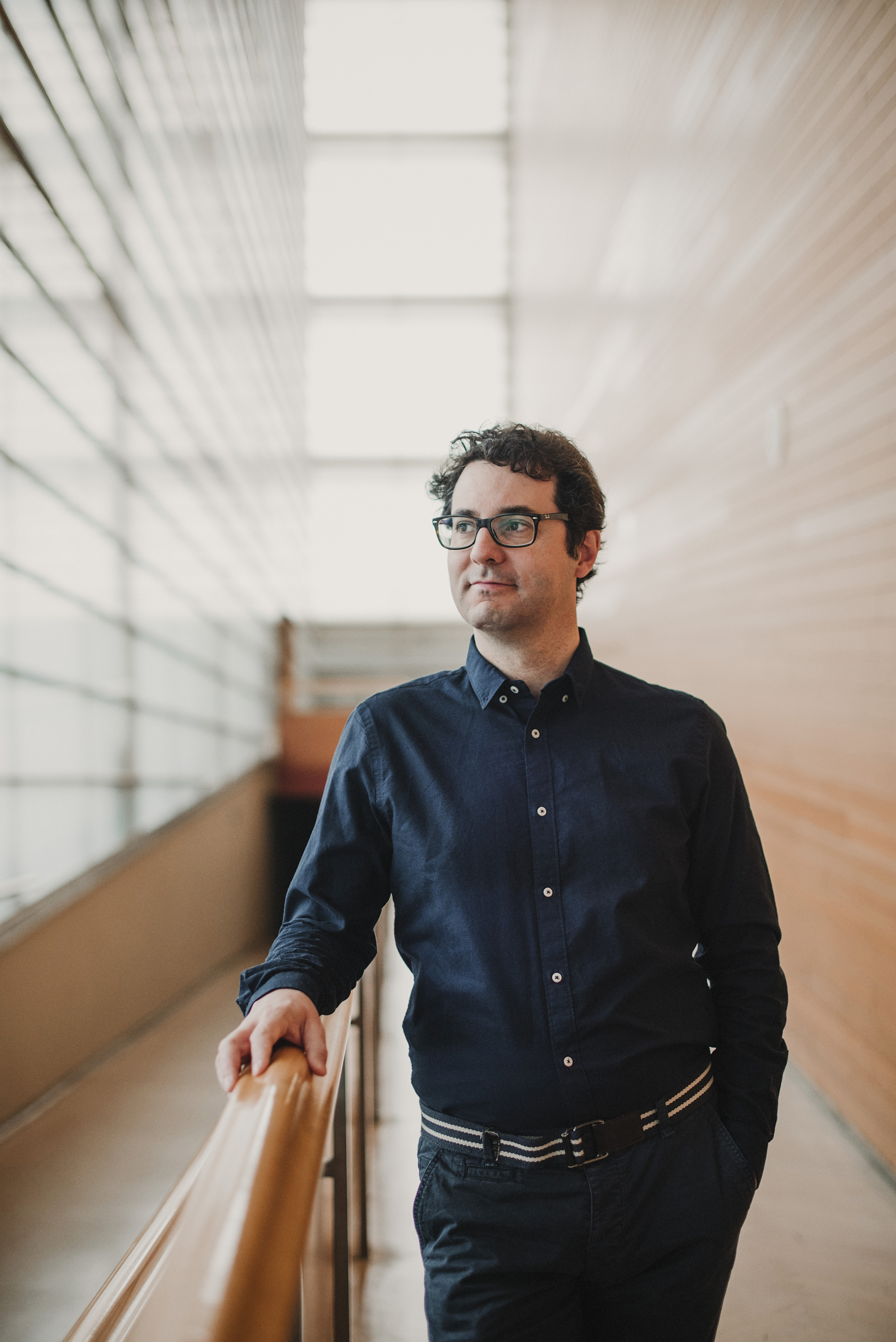
2022 winner Fernando Velázquez.

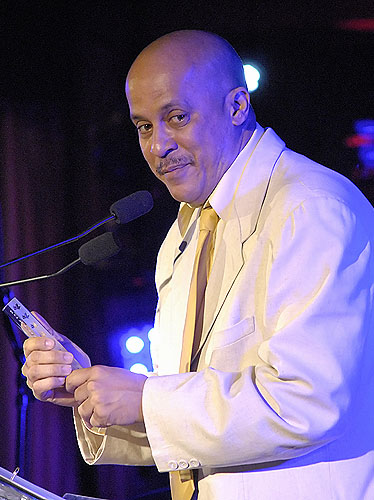
2024 winner Hilario Durán.

Year	Arranger(s)	Work	Artist(s)	Nominees	Ref.
2018	Milton Salcedo	"Se Le Ve"	Milton Salcedo featuring Amaury Gutiérrez, Carlos Oliva, Michel Puche & Andres Buitrago	Luiz Cláudio Ramos – "Massarandupió" (Chico Buarque); Rigoberto Alfaro – "No Me Platiques Más (Instrumental)" (Mariachi Divas de Cindy Shea); Lisandro Baum – "Batango" (Quinteto Bataraz); Vagner Cunha – "Campos Neutrais" (Vitor Ramil)	
2019	Rodner Padilla	"Sirena"	Luis Enrique + C4 Trio	Otmaro Ruiz – "Red Wall (Va A Caer)" (Branly, Ruiz & Haslip); Juan Pablo Contreras – "Mariachitlán" (Juan Pablo Contreras, Marco Parisotto & Orquesta Filarmónica de Jalisco); Pablo Cebrián and Ketama – "Loko de Amor" (Ketama); César Orozco – "Imprevisto" (Raices Jazz Orchestra, Pablo Gil & Tony Succar)	
2020	Lorenzo Ferrero	"La Flor de la Canela"	Afro-Peruvian Jazz Orchestra	Daniel Barón – "Te Extraño" (Dani Barón); John Beasley & Maria Mendes – "Asas Fechadas" (Maria Mendes featuring Metropole Orkest & John Beasley); Ariel García & Carlos Peña – "Bésame Mucho" (Carlos Peña y Su Big Band & Daniela Calvario); Rosino Serrano – "Guapanguito" (Rosino Serrano & Orquesta Moderna featuring Gianluca Littera & Alex Mercado)	
2021	Juan Luis Guerra	"Ojalá que Llueva Café (Versión Privé)"	Juan Luis Guerra	Kendall Moore – "Blue in Green (Sky and Sea)" (Roxana Amed); César Orozco – "Tierra Mestiza" (America Viva Band); Jorge Calandrelli – "Adiós Nonino" (Jorge Calandrelli); Vince Mendoza – "Um Beijo" (Melody Gardot)	
2022	Fernando Velázquez	"El Plan Maestro"	Jorge Drexler	Rosino Serrano – "Llévatela" (Armando Manzanero & EJE Ejecutantes de México); Daniel Barón & Henry Villalobos – "Son de la Loma" (Dani Barón); Marco Godoy – "Adoro" (Alondra de la Parra & Buika); Paul Rubinstein – "Cucurrucucú Paloma" (Alondra de la Parra & Pitingo)	
2023	Rafael Valencia	"Songo Bop"	Camilo Valencia & Richard Bravo featuring Milton Salcedo	Joe McCarthy & Vince Norman – "Waltz of the Flowers" (Joe McCarthy's New York Afro Bop Alliance Big Band); John Beasley & Maria Mendes – "Com Que Voz" (Maria Mendes featuring Metropole Orkest & John Beasley); Daniel Freiberg – "Crónicas Latinoamericanas" (Various Artists); Emilio Solla – "Spain" (Various Artists)	
2024	Hilario Durán	"Night in Tunisia"	Hilario Durán and His Latin Jazz Big Band featuring Paquito D'Rivera	Daniel Freiberg – "Sueño Austral" (Barcelona Clarinet Players, Freiburger Blasorchester, Miguel Etchegoncelay & Daniel Freiberg); Julio Reyes Copello – "Fuego de Noche, Nieve de Dia" (Ricky Martin & Christian Nodal); Nailor Proveta – "Linha de Passe" (Orquestra Jazz de Matosinhos, Gabi Guedes & Kiko Freitas); Andrés Soto – "Rapsodia Aérea" (Andrés Soto, Orquesta Sinfónica Nacional de Costa Rica & Carl St. Clair)	
2025	Cesar Orozco	"Camaleón"	Cesar Orozco & Son Ahead	Rafael Beck & Felipe Montanaro – "Sapato Velho" (Rafael Beck e Felipe Montanaro); Cheche Alara & David Bisbal – "Te Deseo Muy Felices Fiestas (Have Yourself a Merry Little Christmas)" (David Bisbal); Edy Lan – "Procuro Olvidarte - Versión Sinfónica" (Brava featuring Yaneth Sandoval); Joachim Horsley – "Bach's Cuban Concerto for Piano and Tres" (Joachim Horsley featuring Olivia Soler & Boston Public Quartet and Friends); Cassio Vianna – "Flight 962" (Cassio Vianna Jazz Orchestra)	

== See also ==
- Grammy Award for Best Arrangement, Instrumental and Vocals
- Grammy Award for Best Arrangement, Instrumental or A Cappella
