= White Hot Odyssey =

- Also known as: Dazzler; Vagiant; Vagiant UK
- Origin: Eugene, Oregon, United States
- Genres: Hard rock, glam rock, glam punk
- Years active: 2002–2005
- Label: Jive Records
- Members: Steve Perry; Jason Moss; Mark Rogers; Ed Cole; Jivan Valpey
- Website: WhiteHotOdyssey.com

White Hot Odyssey was an American hard rock band formed in Eugene, Oregon, United States, in 2002 by Cherry Poppin' Daddies vocalist Steve Perry and guitarist Jason Moss, along with guitarist Mark Rogers, bassist Ed Cole and drummer Jivan Valpey.

== Biography ==
In frontman Steve Perry's words, White Hot Odyssey was an attempt to bring the "roll" back to "rock and roll", an experiment in "sexual, stupid, big dumb rock" reminiscent of the glam, hard rock and protopunk of the 1970s. Perry explained that he had always wanted to front a band of this style since he was an adolescent and listened to groups such as the New York Dolls, The Stooges, Sweet and T. Rex. Having experimented with glam rock under the production supervision of Tony Visconti for the Daddies' 2000 single "Diamond Light Boogie", Perry was inspired to pursue the idea further. In a nod to the extravagant and outlandish fashion of glam rock (and perhaps the early years of the Daddies), i.e. feather boas and other such androgynous attire, White Hot Odyssey was styled around Louis XIV powdered wigs and knee-length pantaloons.

The band originally formed as "Vagiant", playing their first show in early 2003 as an opening act for the Cherry Poppin' Daddies (due to their lavish costumes, however, most people had no idea that it was, in fact, Perry performing in the opening act as well). Shortly afterwards, their name was changed to "Vagiant UK" following the discovery of another band by the name of Vagiant, and finally to "White Hot Odyssey" after their signing to Jive Records to avoid legal complications. The group performed steadily over the next two years, playing major venues throughout the Northwest such as Portland's Crystal Ballroom and Eugene's W.O.W. Hall and McDonald Theatre, often as a supporting act for the Daddies.

In 2004, White Hot Odyssey was signed to Jive Records, largely due to the success that the similarly theatrical hard rock/glam band The Darkness had then seen, and released their self-titled debut in November 2004. Perry was surprised because the same label representative had rejected a similar demo earlier.

White Hot Odyssey played their last show in late 2005. In 2013, Perry re-recorded the White Hot Odyssey song "Subway Killer" for the Daddies' sixth studio album White Teeth, Black Thoughts, re-written in a rockabilly style.

== Members ==
- Steve Perry (Le Count d' Monet) – vocals/guitar
- Jason Moss (Jace) – guitar
- Mark Rogers – guitar
- Ed Cole – bass
- Jivan Valpey – drums

== Discography ==
=== Studio albums ===
Year	Title	Label
2004	White Hot Odyssey	Mojo/Jive

=== Non-album tracks ===
Year	Track	Source
2005	"Look British, Think Yiddish" (Steve Perry) – 3:40	available on official site since January 2005
