= Diamond Light Boogie =

2000 single by Cherry Poppin' Daddies

Single by Cherry Poppin' Daddies

from the album Soul Caddy
- Released: October 2000
- Recorded: 2000
- Genre: Glam rock
- Length: 3:42
- Label: Mojo Records
- Songwriter(s): Steve Perry
- Producer(s): Steve Perry, Jack Joseph Puig, Tony Visconti, Anders Hanssen

Cherry Poppin' Daddies singles chronology
"Here Comes the Snake" (1998)	"Diamond Light Boogie" (2000)	"I Love American Music" (2013)

Audio sample
- file; help

"Diamond Light Boogie" is a song by American band the Cherry Poppin' Daddies on their 2000 album Soul Caddy. It was the first and only single released off Soul Caddy and the Daddies' fourth and final single to be released by Mojo Records.

== Overview ==
=== Music and lyrics ===
Following the international success the Cherry Poppin' Daddies had experienced with their 1997 swing music compilation Zoot Suit Riot, the band had begun to feel dismayed over their media image as a "retro swing band" at the exclusion of the dominant ska and punk influences which made up much of their recorded material. As such, the band's follow-up studio album Soul Caddy would find the band moving away from swing music and into newer stylistic territory, drawing primarily from the rock and pop of the late 1960s and early 1970s.

"Diamond Light Boogie" was written as the album's leading single, a rock song that songwriter Steve Perry intended to help introduce a wider audience to a better perspective of the Daddies' music as well as attempt to bridge the gap between their swing-oriented fanbase and their non-swing music. The song is composed as a fusion of glam rock and jump swing, featuring the rhythmic backbeat and horn section common of swing music set against T. Rex-influenced guitar riffs. Said Perry of the track:

"Diamond Light Boogie"...was inspired, like its predecessor, "Zoot Suit Riot", by a historical time period...the glitter, glam rock of the early '70s. The vibe is about partying, fun and absurd fashion...and, like "Zoot Suit Riot", it is both a celebration of a period and an attempt to bring something new to the table.

To help lend a vintage authenticity to the song's production, the Daddies enlisted supervision from legendary glam rock producer Tony Visconti, as well as featuring Mark Volman, formerly of The Turtles and the Mothers of Invention, to provide backing vocals.

=== Release and reception ===
Despite allowing the Daddies creative control over the writing and production of Soul Caddy, Mojo Records harbored ambivalent feelings over the album's largely rock-oriented musical direction and did little to promote either the album or its single, at one point releasing the latter without the Daddies' name on it, allegedly due to hesitancy over releasing a rock song from a band most widely known for swing music. Neither Soul Caddy nor "Diamond Light Boogie" met with any commercial success, but the single nevertheless received moderate critical attention. Allmusic, having given Soul Caddy a very positive review, described the song's glam styling and "sassy songwriting" as the epitome of the album's "musical excitement", while The Boston Globe, in a negative review, extensively criticized the album for being derivative of other artists, describing "Diamond Light Boogie" as being "ripped straight from The Soup Dragons' catalog".

== Formats and track listing ==
Diamond Light Boogie US Promo CD
No.	Title	Length
1.	"Diamond Light Boogie" (single edit)	3:30
2.	"Diamond Light Boogie" (album version)	3:42
3.	"Diamond Light Boogie" (instrumental)	3:37

== Personnel ==
- Steve Perry - lead vocals, guitar
- Dan Schmid - bass guitar
- Jason Moss - guitar
- Dana Heitman - trumpet
- Sean Flannery - tenor saxophone, bass clarinet
- Ian Early - alto saxophone, bass clarinet
- Tim Donahue - drums
- Dustin Lanker - keyboards

=== Additional musicians ===
- Johnny Goetchius - backing vocals
- Mark Volman - backing vocals

=== Production ===
- Produced by Steve Perry and Jack Joseph Puig
- Additional production by Tony Visconti and Anders Hanssen
- Mixed by Jack Joseph Puig
