= White Hot Odyssey (album) =

Studio album by White Hot Odyssey
- Released: November 9, 2004
- Genre: Hard rock, glam rock
- Length: 37:52
- Label: Mojo/Jive
- Producer: Steve Perry

White Hot Odyssey is the debut album by American hard rock band White Hot Odyssey, released on Mojo/Jive Records in 2004. The album was produced by lead singer-songwriter Steve Perry.

The song "Subway Killer" was later re-recorded in a rockabilly style as a bonus track for White Teeth, Black Thoughts, the 2013 album by Perry's other band, the Cherry Poppin' Daddies.

== Track listing ==
All songs written and composed by Steve Perry.

1. "Good Head" – 3:49
2. "Permanent Juvenile" – 3:52
3. "Hot Tub Party" – 3:00
4. "Popularity Contest" – 3:21
5. "Head Cheerleader" – 2:32
6. "Spit It Up" – 3:11
7. "Subway Killer" – 3:45
8. "Siamese Connection" – 3:35
9. "Ride the Snake" – 3:43
10. "Lick the Pole" – 3:31
11. "3 in Bed" – 3:28

== Credits ==
=== White Hot Odyssey ===
- Steve Perry (Le Count d' Monet) – vocals/guitar
- Jason Moss – guitar
- Mark Rogers – guitar
- Ed Cole – bass
- Jivan Valpey – drums

=== Production ===
- Produced by Steve Perry
- Engineered and mixed by Bill Barnett at Gung Ho Studios in Eugene, Oregon
- Mastered by Chaz Harper and Jive Records
- Package design by Mark Dixon, photography by Rob Powell
