= Songs in the Key of Eh =

Songs in the Key of Eh!

Live album by Mad Caddies
- Released: September 21, 2004
- Recorded: 2004
- Venue: The Opera House
- Genre: Ska punk
- Length: 56:38
- Label: Fat Wreck Chords
- Producer: Mad Caddies

Mad Caddies chronology
| Just One More (2003) | Songs in the Key of Eh! (2004) | Keep It Going (2007) |

Professional ratings
Review scores
| Source | Rating |
|---|---|
| Allmusic | link |
| Ox-Fanzine | 8/10 |

Songs in the Key of Eh is the first live recording from the Mad Caddies from a 2004 concert at the Opera House in Toronto, Ontario, Canada.

== Track listing ==
1. "Intro" – 1:46
2. "Macho Nachos" – 3:39
3. "10 West" – 2:54
4. "Leavin" – 2:51
5. "Weird Beard" – 2:52
6. "No Hope" – 1:33
7. "Contraband" – 1:18
8. "Monkeys" – 3:25
9. "Days Away/The Bell Tower/Popcorn/Days Away" – 6:26
10. "The Gentleman" – 2:23
11. "Villains" – 2:21
12. "Last Breath" – 3:07
13. "Mary Melody" – 3:28
14. "Drinking For 11" – 3:45
15. "Preppie Girl" – 3:03
16. "Mum's The Word" – 1:30
17. "Road Rash" – 2:03
18. "Silence" – 2:45
19. "All American Badass" – 5:29
