= Dirty Rice (album) =

Studio album by Mad Caddies
- Released: May 13, 2014
- Genres: Alternative rock, reggae rock, ska
- Length: 41:08
- Label: Fat Wreck Chords

Mad Caddies chronology
| Consentual Selections (2010) | Dirty Rice (2014) | Punk Rocksteady (2018) |

Dirty Rice is the sixth full-length studio album by California ska punk band Mad Caddies, released on May 13, 2014. This was the band's first full-length album in over seven years, following 2007's Keep It Going. After a few years of writing and pre-production, the band had 25 songs completed. They met with Fat Mike in September 2013 to help sort through the collection, resulting in a list narrowed down to the 12 songs appearing on the album.

== Critical reception ==
Professional ratings
Review scores
| Source | Rating |
|---|---|
| AllMusic | 3.5/5 stars |
| Alternative Press | 4/5 stars |
| Ox-Fanzine | 3.5/5 stars |
| Punknews.org | 3.5/5 stars |

At Alternative Press, Jeff Rosenstock rated the album four stars out of five, remarking that "Dirty Rice finds the band at their best".

== Track listing ==
All tracks are written by Mad Caddies.

| No. | Title | Length |
|---|---|---|
| 1. | "Brand New Scar" | 4:03 |
| 2. | "Love Myself" | 2:49 |
| 3. | "Down and Out" | 4:41 |
| 4. | "Shoot Out the Lights" | 3:19 |
| 5. | "Dangerous" | 3:12 |
| 6. | "Bring It Down" | 2:27 |
| 7. | "Shot in the Dark" | 3:56 |
| 8. | "Little Town" | 3:37 |
| 9. | "Airplane" | 2:48 |
| 10. | "Callie's Song" | 3:43 |
| 11. | "Back to the Bed" | 3:27 |
| 12. | "Drinking the Night Away" | 3:06 |
| Total length: | | 41:08 |

== Personnel ==
Band

- Chuck Robertson - Vocals, Guitar
- Sascha Lazor - Guitar, Banjo
- Graham Palmer - Bass, Vocals
- Keith Douglas - Trumpet, Vocals
- Eduardo Hernandez - Trombone
- Dustin Lanker - Piano, Organ
- Todd Rosenberg - Drums

Artwork

- Sergie Loobkoff - Cover design
- Graham Palmer - Cover photo
