= The Visible Men =

American pop band

- Origin: Eugene, Oregon
- Genres: Baroque pop
- Years active: 1999–2007, 2009
- Label: Leisure King Productions
- Members: Dustin Lanker; Dan Schmid; Jordan Glenn; Jimi Russel
- Past members: Tim Donahue

The Visible Men are an American pop band formed in 1999, consisting of Dustin Lanker (vocals, keyboards), Dan Schmid (bass guitar), Jordan Glenn (drums) and later Jimi Russel (guitar).

== Biography ==
The Visible Men initially formed in the fall of 1999 as a side project for Cherry Poppin' Daddies members Dustin Lanker and Dan Schmid, both wanting to write and perform songs in a more experimental vein than what they had been doing with the Daddies. The band played their first show in November 2000, aided by Daddies drummer Tim Donahue, who remained with the band until he left to tour with Yngwie Malmsteen the following year. The group recorded several demos and played live shows—with and without a drummer—until indie label Leisure King Productions offered them a deal. The label encouraged Lanker and Schmid to hire a full-time drummer, which led to Jordan Glenn joining the band.

The band's debut album, the minimalist acoustic and piano-driven In Socks Mode, was released in 2002. Their second release, Love:30, followed three years later. In contrast to In Socks Mode, Love:30 had a stronger psychedelic slant, utilizing a fuller sound and more instruments, including organ, electric guitar and accordion.

The Visible Men toured extensively throughout 2005 and 2006, primarily in Oregon and Washington, though they also embarked on tours through California, the Southwest and the majority of the Northwestern United States. In February 2003, the group performed The Who Sell Out at John Henry's in Eugene.

In 2006, the band recruited guitarist Jimi Russel and announced that they were working on new material that, according to Lanker, was "influenced by 70s and 80s rock, but [had] the same pop influence".

The Visible Men went on hiatus in 2007, and by 2009 the band's website had been disabled. Their last performance to date was a one-off show on November 27, 2009, at John Henry's in Eugene, Oregon.

== Members ==
- Dustin Lanker – vocals, keyboards/piano
- Dan Schmid – bass
- Jordan Glenn – drums
- Jimi Russell – guitar (2006 - )
- Tim Donahue – drums (2000–2001, occasional studio recordings)

== Discography ==
Year	Title	Label
2002	In Socks Mode	Leisure King Productions
2005	Love:30	Leisure King Productions
