= Mad Caddies =

American ska punk band

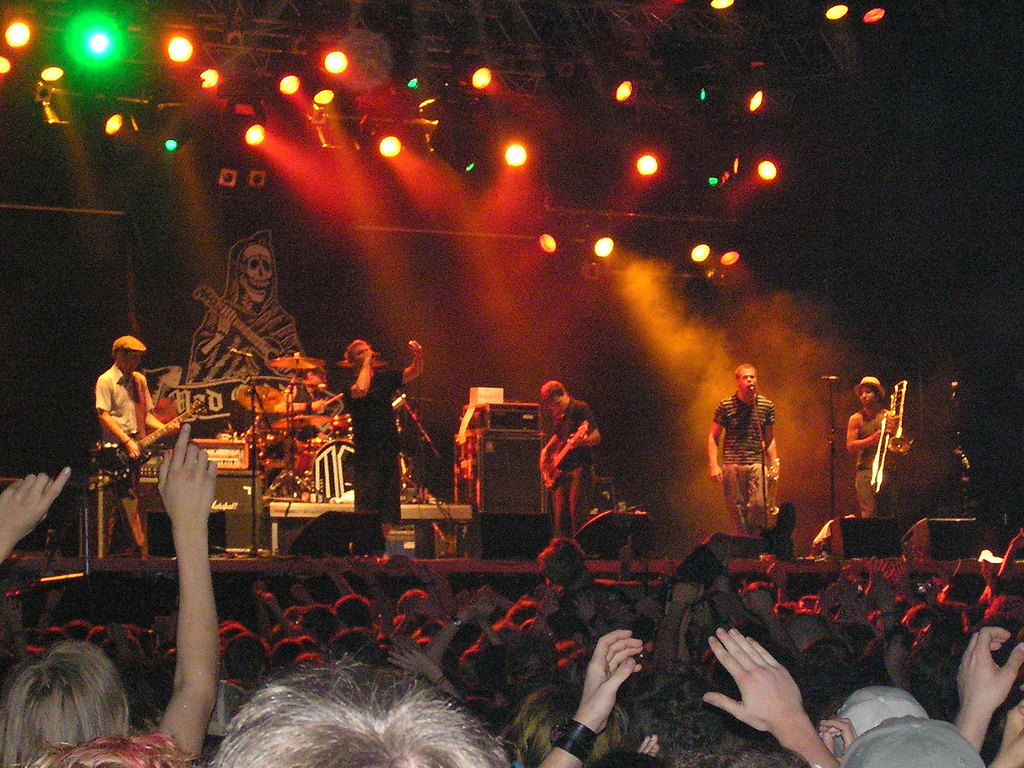
- The Mad Caddies in 2006

Background information
- Also known as: The Ivy League the Caddies
- Origin: Solvang, California, U.S.
- Genres: Ska punk, reggae, punk rock, pop punk
- Years active: 1995–present
- Labels: Fat Wreck Chords; Honest Don's; SBÄM
- Members: Chuck Robertson; Jon Gazi; Jason Lichau; Boz Rivera; Ian Cook; Nicolas Benedetti; Bruno Ufret
- Past members: Sean Sellers; Marcos Jose Gonzalez; Stephane Montigny; Brandon Landelius; Todd Rosenberg; Sascha Lazor; Graham Palmer; Eduardo Hernandez; Mark Bush; Dustin Lanker; Derrick Plourde; Keith Douglas; Carter Benson; Mark Iversen; Brian Flenniken; James William Malis
- Website: madcaddiesmusic.com

The Mad Caddies (or the Caddies) is an American ska punk band from Solvang, California. The band formed in 1995 and has released seven full-length albums, one live album, and two EPs.

The Mad Caddies sound has influences from broad ranging genres including ska (especially ska 3rd wave), punk rock, hardcore punk, reggae, dixieland jazz, Latin music, polka, cowpunk ("Crew Cut Chuck"), and sea shanties ("Weird Beard").

== History ==
Founding members Chuck Robertson, Sascha Lazor, Todd Rosenberg, and Carter Benson started the group while attending Santa Ynez Valley Union High School.

In the band's early beginnings in the mid-1990s, they performed as Cracked Macaroni at Santa Ynez Valley Union High School. Shortly thereafter, the band played under the name The Ivy League, but in 1996 they changed their name after signing to the Honest Don's Records label to avoid confusion (as well as potential litigation) with two prior bands that had the same moniker. The band's debut album, Quality Soft Core, was released the next year. After the release of the album, the band was signed to Fat Mike's label Fat Wreck Chords, through which the Mad Caddies have released 6 other studio albums, 2 EPs, and a live album. The Caddies have toured extensively throughout their career, including tours across the US, Europe, Japan, Canada, Mexico, South Africa, Australia, New Zealand, and South America. Punk Rocksteady was released on June 15, 2018, and was produced by Fat Mike. In 2020 the Caddies released a 5-song EP titled House on Fire on Fat Wreck Chords. In 2023, the band signed with SBÄM Records, announcing their eighth studio album, Arrows Room 117.

== Other projects ==
In 2008 Chuck Robertson started a side project, Ellwood, which featured Robertson on vocals and guitar, Graham Palmer on bass, Todd Rosenberg on drums, and Dustin Lanker on keys. The band was active from 2008 to 2012. Former trumpet player Keith Douglas has been a member of Mariachi El Bronx since 2012, as well as King City with members of Lagwagon and RKL.

A project with former member Carter Benson (under the alias "Sharky Towers") called Jaws was released in 2006. Other members include Derrick Plourde and "Little" Joe Raposo. The release is called Death & Taxes Volume One and sounds significantly different than Mad Caddies' music. Bassist Graham Palmer has fronted his solo project, Kinothek, since 2008. Since 2020 Palmer has recorded as Redacted Choir alongside Jordan Dalrymple.

In 1999 Robertson, Sascha Lazor, and Benson started a side project with Derrick Plourde called Sweet Action. Today their tracks are really hard to find. The band posted them during the late '90s on Mp3.com and today somebody has put them out on YouTube. Songs like "Did I tell you that I like Bad Religion" have a strong skate punk direction. The project was a pure pop-punk/skate punk project without horns or ska elements. One of the tracks was on the Happy Meals compilation series on My Records, which was owned by Joey Cape from Lagwagon. In 2021, it was announced that Chuck Robertson would be releasing a new solo album under his own name. He toured the next year backed by touring musicians.

== Members ==
=== Current ===
- Chuck Robertson – lead vocals, rhythm guitar (1995–present)
- Jason Lichau – trumpet, backing vocals (2015–2017, 2022–present)
- Ian Cook – lead guitar (2024–present)
- Nicolas Benedetti – trombone (2022–present)
- Bruno Ufret – drums (2026–present)
- Jon Gazi – bass guitar, backing vocals, percussion (2007–present)
- Boz Rivera – percussion (2022–present), drums (2000–2001, 2008–2009)

=== Past ===
- Sean Sellers - drums (2022-2026)
- Stepháne Montigny – trombone, backing vocals (2022–2024)
- Marcos Jose Gonzalez – trombone (2024–present)
- Brandon Landelius – lead guitar, backing vocals (2022–2024)
- Sascha Lazor – lead guitar, banjo (1995–2022)
- Eduardo Hernandez – trombone (1996–2022)
- Graham Palmer – bass guitar, vocals (2009–2022)
- Todd Rosenberg – drums (1995–1999, 2010–2022)
- Mark Bush – trumpet, backing vocals (2018–2022)
- Keith Douglas – trumpet, vocals (1997–2016)
- Carter Benson – guitar, vocals (1995–2002)
- Dustin Lanker – keyboards (2007–2015)
- Mark Iverson – bass (1995–2006)
- Chris Badham – bass (2006–2008) (touring member)
- Brian Flenniken – drums (2001–2008)
- Derrick Plourde – drums (2001)
- Bobby "Moonbird" Vesnaver – trumpet (2014–2015) (touring member)
- Chris Butcher – trombone (2015) (touring member)

== Discography ==
Studio albums

- Quality Soft Core (1997)
- Duck and Cover (1998)
- Rock the Plank (2001)
- Just One More (2003)
- Keep It Going (2007)
- Dirty Rice (2014)
- Punk Rocksteady (2018)
- Arrows Room 117 (2024)

EPs

- The Holiday Has Been Cancelled (2000)
- FlashlightBrown MadCaddies (split EP with Flashlight Brown) (2002)
- House on Fire (2020)

Live albums

- Songs in the Key of Eh! (Live from Toronto) (2004)
- Live @ Munich Backstage Germany 2007 (only 300 copies of this live DVD were made worldwide)

Compilations

- Consentual Selections (2010)

Music Videos

- Road Rash (1998)
- Leavin' (2003)
- State of Mind (2007)
- Let it Go (2020)
