= Love:30 =

Studio album by The Visible Men
- Released: October 18, 2005
- Genre: Baroque pop, pop rock
- Length: 47:13
- Label: Leisure King
- Producer: The Visible Men; Scott McLean; Bill Barnett

The Visible Men chronology
In Socks Mode (2002)	Love:30 (2005)

Love:30 is the second studio album by American piano rock band The Visible Men, released in 2005 on Leisure King Productions.

== Overview ==
In contrast to the minimalist approach heard on In Socks Mode, Love:30 is rooted more in psychedelic eclecticism, featuring a richer keyboard-driven sound and the inclusion of additional instruments such as accordions and electric guitars.

Love:30 was released to a generally positive reception, with much praise being given to the music and most criticism being directed at its lyrics. The Daily Emerald called the music "well-crafted and engaging", with the reviewer stating "I would hate to be any other band in town if The Visible Men ever hit their stride", and Sacramento's News Review, though deriding the tendency of the lyrics to "take themselves too seriously", summarized the album as "melancholy and beautiful".

== Track listing ==
All tracks composed by Dustin Lanker, except where otherwise noted:

1. "The Toilet Show" – 3:18
2. "Three" – 3:50
3. "Stage Fright" – 5:10
4. "Animal" – 3:01
5. "In Formation" – 5:07
6. "Guilt Trip" – 4:11
7. "Paper Cup" (Lanker, Dan Schmid) – 7:02
8. "Pinocchio" – 5:51
9. "Like a Loony Bird" – 4:11
10. "Rest Easy" – 5:32

== Credits ==
=== The Visible Men ===
- Dustin Lanker – vocals, keyboards
- Dan Schmid – bass, guitar
- Jordan Glenn – drums, percussion

=== Additional musicians ===
- Tim Donahue - drums (tracks 5, 7)
- Tony Figoli - drums (track 6)
- Zoot Horn Rollo - electric guitar (track 7)
- Michael Roderick - accordion (tracks 6, 9)
- Adam Wendt - electric guitar (track 6)

=== Production ===
- Produced and mixed by Bill Barnett, Scott McLean and the Visible Men.
- Mastered by Jim Rusby, Rusby Mastering
- Recorded and engineered by Bill Barnett at Gung-Ho Studios in Eugene, Oregon
