= In Socks Mode =

Studio album by The Visible Men
- Released: October 1, 2002
- Genre: Baroque pop, pop rock
- Length: 37:49
- Label: Leisure King
- Producer: The Visible Men; J. Scott McLean; Bill Barnett

The Visible Men chronology
In Socks Mode (2002)	Love:30 (2005)

In Socks Mode is the debut album by American band The Visible Men, released in 2002 on Leisure King Productions.

== Overview ==
The instrumentation of In Socks Mode could be considered minimalist: most of the songs consist solely of piano and bass guitar, with slightly more than half of the tracks featuring light drum accompaniment.

Despite its low-key indie release, In Socks Mode was met with mostly positive reviews. In Music We Trust graded it with an "A", calling it "a shining example of pop music that is infectious and laden with hooks, but not overly accessible or simplified for your listening pleasures". Allmusic gave the album a rating of 3/5, praising the "wonderfully accomplished" piano techniques and the "sheer attractiveness" of his melodies, comparing it favorably to the Ben Folds Five, but criticizing the album's often low-brow lyricism.

== Track listing ==
All songs composed by Dustin Lanker, except where otherwise noted.

1. "Dial Tone" – 3:44
2. "Core of the Planet" – 4:12
3. "Blow Shit Up" (Lanker, Dan Schmid) – 3:28
4. "$90" – 3:20
5. "Hall of Fame" – 3:09
6. "Strange Hash" (Lanker, Schmid) – 4:35
7. "Poker Face" – 2:33
8. "Semen Factory" – 5:00
9. "On the Sidelines" – 3:44
10. "King Shit" – 4:04

== Credits ==
=== The Visible Men ===
- Dustin Lanker – vocals, keyboards
- Dan Schmid – bass
- Jordan Glenn – drums (tracks 6, 10)

=== Additional musicians ===
- Tony Figoli – drums (tracks 2, 4)
- Tim Donahue – drums (tracks 1, 5, 8)
- Ryan Sumner – drums (track 7)

=== Production ===
- Produced and mixed by Bill Barnett, J. Scott McLean and The Visible Men at Gung-Ho Studios in Eugene, Oregon
- Engineered by Bill Barnett, Don Latarski and Glen Bonney
- Mastered by Jim Rusby, Sony Disc Manufacturing - Springfield Oregon
- Track 3 recorded by Don Latarski at Crescent Studios in Eugene, Oregon.
- Track 5 recorded by Glenn Bonney at Glenn Bonney Recording in Eugene, Oregon.
