= Ellwood (band) =

American band

- Origin: Santa Ynez Valley, California, United States
- Genres: Reggae, ska, reggae rock
- Years active: 2009-2012
- Label: Fat Wreck Chords
- Members: Chuck Robertson; Dustin Lanker; Graham Palmer; Todd Rosenberg
- Website: www.ellwoodmusic.com

Ellwood is an American reggae and ska band formed in the Santa Ynez Valley in 2009. The group consists of Mad Caddies frontman Chuck Robertson, Caddies members Graham Palmer and Todd Rosenberg, and former Caddies member and former Cherry Poppin' Daddies keyboardist Dustin Lanker.

== Biography ==
Ellwood formed when Robertson relocated back to his hometown of Solvang, California in the late 2000s. After reconnecting with Palmer and Rosenberg, and finding the Santa Ynez Valley music scene lacking, the trio decided to form a new band just for fun, eventually recruiting longtime Caddies touring keyboardist Dustin Lanker. In contrast to the more punk rock and ska punk sound of the Mad Caddies, Ellwood focused more on sunny, mellow and mid-tempo ska and reggae.

In 2010, after a period of playing local shows, Ellwood chose to move forward and record an album. Spending six months putting together material, the group demoed an album in Palmer's garage, then recorded it in a Santa Barbara studio in only two days. After putting Ellwood on hold for almost a year to focus on the Mad Caddies, Robertson eventually passed a copy of the album onto Fat Mike at a party, who called Robertson several days later and agreed to put it out on Fat Wreck Chords.

Lost in Transition was released on June 21, 2011, meeting with positive critical reviews from the likes of Alternative Press, PopMatters and Punknews.org. In promotion of the album, Ellwood carried out a headlining tour of Europe in November and December 2011, followed in January 2012 by a West coast United States tour supporting NOFX and Old Man Markley.

Shortly after the release of Lost in Transition, Robertson stated that Ellwood was already working on new material for their next album, noting that the music would be a drastic departure from their debut, dabbling in "heavy, aggressive, poppy rock". According to Robertson, "The plan for Ellwood is really to just take it record by record, and whatever the theme we want to go for, just go for it....[w]e're just going to keep expanding, and not be a band that's chained to one sound or style". Robertson also noted that the band hoped to complete five records in five years.

In an update posted to Facebook on November 1, 2012, the band confirmed that work had begun on a second studio album, though Ellwood would be "put in the freezer for a little while" as Robertson returned to writing and touring with the Caddies. After years of inactivity, however, Robertson finally confirmed in an October 2020 interview that Ellwood was officially "defunct.”

== Discography ==
- Lost in Transition (2011, Fat Wreck Chords)

== Band members ==
- Chuck Robertson - vocals, guitar
- Dustin Lanker - keyboards, vocals
- Graham Palmer - bass, vocals
- Todd Rosenberg - drums, vocals
