= The Boop-A-Doo =

Studio album by Cherry Poppin' Daddies
- Released: January 22, 2016
- Recorded: March 2015 at Gung Ho Studio in Eugene, Oregon
- Length: 41:41
- Label: Space Age Bachelor Pad
- Producer: Steve Perry

Cherry Poppin' Daddies chronology
Please Return the Evening (2014)	The Boop-A-Doo (2016)	Bigger Life (2019)

The Boop-A-Doo is the eighth studio album and tenth album overall by American ska-swing band the Cherry Poppin' Daddies, released on January 22, 2016, by Space Age Bachelor Pad Records.

The second in a planned trilogy of cover albums intended to showcase the Daddies' swing and jazz influences following the 2014 Rat Pack tribute Please Return the Evening, The Boop-A-Doo is a collection of jazz and swing standards from the 1920s and 1930s.

== Production and release ==
In December 2014, while the Daddies were still touring behind the release of Please Return the Evening, performing concerts showcasing both their own repertoire and the songs of the Rat Pack, singer-songwriter Steve Perry posted a blog to the band's official Facebook page discussing his future plans to explore another facet of the band's swing and jazz influences in a live setting, covering a time period of roughly 1928–1937.

In what he called his own "Steve speak", Perry dubbed this musical time period as "the era of the Boop-A-Doop", likely alluding to the popular 1931 song "Don't Take My Boop-Oop-A-Doop Away", though "boop a doo" appears as a lyric in the 1935 showtune "Lullaby of Broadway" ("The hi dee hi and boop a doo/The lullaby of Broadway"), which was ultimately recorded for the album.

In a series of Twitter updates, Perry confirmed that The Boop-A-Doo would start recording on March 10, 2015, at Gung Ho Studios in Eugene, where the Daddies had recorded all of their studio albums since their 1990 debut Ferociously Stoned. He wrote that the band approached the album "as if we were recording directly onto a wax cylinder", making extensive use of vintage pre-1940 instruments and using the banjo as the primary chordal instrument. In September, it was revealed that the album art had been completed by longtime Daddies artist Wayne Shellabarger, and final mixing of the album began in October.

Similar to Please Return the Evening, the Daddies began selling copies of The Boop-A-Doo at their live shows prior to formally announcing the album's release, starting with a December 11 show at the W.O.W. Hall in the Daddies' hometown of Eugene, Oregon. The following day, the Daddies announced the album's official release date of January 22, revealing the album artwork and track listing on December 19.

On March 3, the Daddies released a music video for "That Lindy Hop", directed by Perry.

== Track listing ==
No.	Title	Writer(s)	Length
1.	"That Lindy Hop"	Eubie Blake/Andy Razaf	2:24
2.	"The Joint is Jumpin'"	James P. Johnson/Razaf/Fats Waller	2:37
3.	"42nd Street"	Harry Warren/Al Dubin	3:21
4.	"Kickin' the Gong Around"	Harold Arlen/Ted Koehler	3:32
5.	"Let's Misbehave"	Cole Porter	2:54
6.	"Puttin' On the Ritz"	Irving Berlin	3:40
7.	"We're in the Money"	Warren/Dubin	2:17
8.	"Night and Day"	Porter	3:37
9.	"Top Hat, White Tie and Tails"	Berlin	3:24
10.	"Trickeration"	Arlen/Koehler	2:58
11.	"Lullaby of Broadway"	Warren/Dubin	3:15
12.	"Steppin' Out with My Baby"	Berlin	2:26
13.	"Temptation"	Arthur Freed/Nacio Herb Brown	1:59
14.	"Doin' the New Lowdown"	Jimmy McHugh/Dorothy Fields	3:17
Total length:			41:41

== Personnel ==
Cherry Poppin' Daddies

- Steve Perry - vocals, guitar
- Dan Schmid - bass
- Dana Heitman - trumpet, arrangements (tracks 6, 8, 10, 13)
- Willie Matheis - tenor saxophone, arrangements (tracks 1, 4)
- Joe Freuen - trombone, tuba, arrangements (tracks 2, 5, 7)
- Paul Owen - drums
- Andy Page - alto saxophone, clarinet, arrangements (tracks 11, 12, 14)
- Chris Ward - banjo, guitar

Additional personnel

- Arrangements on tracks 3 and 9 by Jesse Cloninger
- Recorded and mixed by Bill Barnett at Gung Ho Studios, Eugene, Oregon
- Mastered by John Baldwin at John Baldwin mastering
