= Punk Rocksteady =

Studio album by Mad Caddies
- Released: June 15, 2018
- Studio: Motor Studios
- Genres: Ska punk, ska, reggae, reggae rock
- Length: 32:45
- Label: Fat Wreck Chords
- Producer: Fat Mike

Mad Caddies chronology
Dirty Rice (2014)	Punk Rocksteady (2018)	House on Fire (2020)

Professional ratings
Review scores
Source	Rating
Away from Life	4/5 stars
daMusic	(positive)
Fördeflüsterer	(positive)
Muzika.hr	3.5/5 stars
Ox-Fanzine	4/5 stars
The Reviews Are In	(positive)
The Spill Magazine	4/5 stars
Visions	

Punk Rocksteady is the seventh full-length studio album as well as the first cover album by California ska punk band Mad Caddies, which was released on June 15, 2018 by Fat Wreck Chords. It was released four years after their full-length Dirty Rice (2014). The album consists of twelve originally punk rock songs that were hand-picked by the band alongside Fat Wreck Chords owner and NOFX singer Fat Mike, who also produced the album, and transformed into their trademark reggae sound, while also using influences from other genres, like dancehall, rock music, ska, Americana and more. The entire album was made available for streaming a day before its release.

== Track listing ==
1. "Sorrow" (Bad Religion) - 3:21
2. "Sleep Long" (Operation Ivy) feat. (Aimee Allen) & (Joshua Waters Rudge of The Skints) - 2:06
3. "She" (Green Day) - 3:02
4. "…And We Thought That Nation-States Were a Bad Idea" feat. (Fat Mike) (Propagandhi) - 2:24
5. "She’s Gone" (NOFX) feat. (Aimee Allen) - 3:47
6. "Am" (Tony Sly) - 2:24
7. "Alien 8" (Lagwagon) - 1:52
8. "Some Kinda Hate" (Misfits) - 1:59
9. "2Rak005" (Bracket) - 2:48
10. "Sink, Florida, Sink" (Against Me!) - 2:45
11. "Jean Is Dead" (Descendents) - 1:34
12. "Take Me Home (Piss Off)" (Snuff) - 4:04

== Personnel ==
Band

- Graham Palmer - bass, vocals
- Todd Rosenberg - drums, percussion
- Mark Bush - trumpet
- Sascha Lazor - guitar, banjo
- Dustin Lanker - organ
- Eduardo Hernandez - trombone
- Chuck Robertson - vocals, guitar

Production

- Todd Rosenberg - engineering, mixing
- Cameron Webb - engineering, mixing
- Angus Cooke - engineering
- Rian Lewis - engineering
- Sascha Lazor - mixing
- Steve Corrao - mastering

Artwork

- Clemente Ruiz - photography
- Sergie Loobkoff - layout
