= Cassio Vianna =

Brazilian-American composer and educator

- Born
- Genres: Jazz, Brazilian Music
- Occupations: Musician, Composer, Educator
- Instrument: Piano
- Years active: 1996–present
- Label: Teal Creek Music
- Website: cassiovianna.com

Cassio Fernando Barbosa Vianna is a Brazilian-American composer, arranger, producer, pianist, and music educator. In 2025, Vianna was nominated for a Latin Grammy Award in the Best Arrangement category. He has released several albums of his original music and has appeared as a sideman and composer on a variety of recording projects in Brazil and in the United States.

He won the National Band Association Young Composers Jazz Composition Contest in 2016. Also that year, his composition "For the Rise of a New Day" was declared the winner of the Ithaca College College/Pro Composer competition.

In 2017, The International Society of Jazz Arrangers & Composers (ISJAC) selected Vianna's Baião Moderno for performance at its annual SONIC (Symposium Outstanding New Instrumental Composition/Arrangement) Awards concert.

== Biography ==
Vianna was born in São Gonçalo, a city in Rio de Janeiro state, Brazil. At the age of 8, he began his musical studies on the organ and piano, playing regularly at a local church. Vianna grew up listening to and playing "a variety of musical styles: from classical to popular music, from traditional Christian hymns to Brazilian jazz, from folk to jazz fusion." In his teenage years, Vianna studied functional and modal harmony under the guidance of Hungarian-Brazilian composer Ian Guest in Rio de Janeiro. This experience had a great influence on Vianna's desire to pursue a career as a composer.

In 2003, Vianna graduated with a Bachelor of Music degree in Brazilian Popular Music from Universidade Federal do Estado do Rio de Janeiro (Uni-Rio). He moved to the United States in 2009 to pursue graduate studies. Vianna now holds a Doctor of Arts degree in Music (Jazz Studies) from the University of Northern Colorado, and a Master of Music degree in Contemporary Music from Western Oregon University.

As a music educator, Vianna taught at several music academies in Rio de Janeiro; and since moving to the U.S., he has taught at Western Oregon University, Umpqua Community College, and the University of Northern Colorado. He is currently Associate Professor of Music and Director of Jazz Studies at Pacific Lutheran University in Tacoma, Washington.

In 2011, Vianna released Letters to Grace: A Song Cycle, published by Teal Creek Music. Joe Ross of "Roots Music Report" wrote: "Vianna’s Brazilian influences result in relaxing, mesmerizing music that explores such topics as lonely nights, warm hearts, river currents, soulful eyes and the mysteries of time."

In 2017, Vianna formed the Cassio Vianna Jazz Orchestra – an ensemble that has recorded two albums of his compositions for jazz big band: Infância (Teal Creek Music, 2017), and Vida (Teal Creek Music, 2025). Jack Bowers of "All About Jazz," in his review of Infância, praised the group as a "well-schooled Jazz Orchestra."

Of Infância, Ross wrote: "This is a powerful, satisfying, celebratory album that captures the Cassio Vianna Jazz Orchestra’s exhilarating, expressive musicality."

Of Vida, Bowers wrote that "brisk and demanding ensemble passages are blended throughout, buttressed by bright and impressive solos, all in the finest big-band tradition", and included the album on his list of "Best Albums of 2025."

Maxazine praised Vida as "big band music at its finest."; while Zillions Magazine singled out the track "Sea Song", writing that "Cassio Vianna invites us to float across boundaries, letting emotions and cultures mingle and then get lost in a big jazz band’s billowing, romantic gestures."

Artists who have performed Vianna's arrangements and compositions include Eric Marienthal, Chris Potter, Ernie Watts, Wayne Bergeron, Martha Reeves, and the United States Army Field Band (The Jazz Ambassadors).

== Discography ==
As a leader or co-leader

- Vida (Teal Creek Music, 2025) — Cassio Vianna Jazz Orchestra
- Infância (Teal Creek Music, 2017) — Cassio Vianna Jazz Orchestra
- Letters to Grace: A Song Cycle (Teal Creek Music, 2011)
- No Caminho (Teal Creek Music, 2009) — Dialeto Brasileiro

As a sideman, composer, or arranger

- Andree-Ann Deschenes: Wanderings (Independent, 2024)
- Zac Wolfe: Hello (Stix Hooper Enterprises, 2014)
- White Teeth, Black Thoughts (Space Age Bachelor Pad Records, 2013) by the Cherry Poppin' Daddies
- Lukas Hein and Dialeto Brasileiro (Teal Creek Music, 2012)
- Piry Reis: Coisa Rara (Dialah, 1999)
