= Dustin Lanker =

American keyboardist (born 1976)

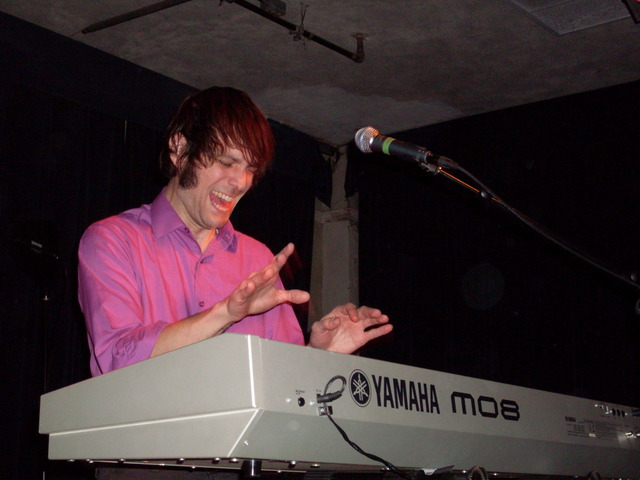
- Lanker playing with the Cherry Poppin' Daddies in 2010

Background information
- Born: October 7, 1976 (age 49); United States
- Origin: Eugene, Oregon, U.S.
- Genres: Rock, swing, ska, ska punk
- Occupation: Musician
- Instruments: Keyboards, piano, vocals, organ
- Years active: 1997 – present

Dustin Ross Lanker (born October 7, 1976) is an American keyboardist, known for his work as a member of the ska-swing band the Cherry Poppin' Daddies and the ska punk band the Mad Caddies, as well as the singer-songwriter for the rock trio The Visible Men.

== Career ==
=== Cherry Poppin' Daddies ===
A pianist since childhood, Lanker joined the Cherry Poppin' Daddies in early 1997 at age 20, first recording on the supplemental tracks for their compilation album Zoot Suit Riot, including the eponymous single which would later serve as the band's commercial breakthrough. Lanker briefly left the Daddies at the height of their fame in October 1998, being replaced by Johnny Goetchius of The Mighty Mighty Bosstones before returning to the band in February 2000. Lanker officially left the band in early 2012, though was able to contribute a majority of the keyboard and piano tracks for the Daddies' 2013 studio album White Teeth, Black Thoughts before his departure.

=== The Visible Men ===
In 1999, Lanker and Daddies bassist Dan Schmid formed the Eugene-based rock trio The Visible Men with a number of different drummers, where Lanker acted as pianist, lead vocalist and songwriter. During the Daddies' hiatus in the early 2000s, Lanker and Schmid focused heavily on The Visible Men, recording two albums on the Leisure King Productions label and extensively touring the western half of the United States before going on hiatus themselves in 2007. The Visible Men played a one-off reunion show in November 2009, though there has been no official announcement as to whether the group will continue recording or performing in the future.

=== Mad Caddies and Ellwood ===
Lanker served as a touring keyboardist for the Northern Californian ska punk band the Mad Caddies for numerous years, as well as an occasional musical collaborator, having lent organ and partial songwriting credit to the Caddies' 2007 album Keep It Going. In 2013, Lanker was added to the band's line-up as an official member.

In 2009, Lanker joined Caddies frontman Chuck Robertson's reggae side project Ellwood. In 2011, Ellwood released their debut album Lost in Transition on Fat Wreck Chords, which was followed by brief touring in the UK and US.

=== Other projects ===
In 1998, Lanker briefly served as a touring keyboardist for the newly reformed, Neville Staple-fronted incarnation of The Specials, accompanying the band on the 1998 Warped Tour, alongside the Daddies.

In 2011, Lanker collaborated on a ragtime-styled soundtrack to a fetish film entitled Rubber Bordello with Fat Wreck Chords owner and NOFX frontman Fat Mike. The soundtrack, credited to "Fat Mike and Dustin Lanker", was released on January 30, 2012. The film was nominated for eight awards at the 30th AVN Awards, including Best Music Soundtrack and Best Original Song ("She-donistic Society"), winning both of them as well as Best BDSM Release.

Lanker is the son of the Pulitzer Prize-winning photographer Brian Lanker.

== Discography ==
=== Cherry Poppin' Daddies ===
See: Cherry Poppin' Daddies discography for complete list of recordings

- Zoot Suit Riot – keyboards (on tracks 1, 7, 12)
- Soul Caddy (2000) – keyboards (on tracks 1–3, 8–9)
- Susquehanna (2008) – keyboards, vocals
- Skaboy JFK (2009) – keyboards, vocals
- White Teeth, Black Thoughts (2013) – keyboards, vocals (on tracks 1–5, 8–10, 12, 21)

=== The Visible Men ===
- In Socks Mode (2002) – vocals, keyboards
- Love:30 (2005) – vocals, keyboards

=== Mad Caddies ===
- Keep It Going (2007) - keyboards
- Dirty Rice (2014) - keyboards
- Punk Rocksteady (2018) - organ

=== Ellwood ===
- Lost in Transition (2011) – keyboards, vocals

=== Miscellaneous ===
- One Man Submarine (2003) – Dan Jones – keyboards, stylophone
- Sad Bear (2011) – Tony Sly – piano, keyboards
- Rubber Bordello Soundtrack (2012) – Fat Mike and Dustin Lanker – keyboards, piano
- Acoustic Volume Two (2012) – Joey Cape/Tony Sly – piano, keyboards
