= Alex Mercado =

Alex Mercado is a Mexican composer, arranger, and jazz pianist, best known for his particular interpretative style and instrumental technique, incorporating contemporary jazz with pop atmospheres. He has been described by Music Life Magazine as "one of the best Mexican jazz players", and two of his albums have been reviewed by Down Beat .

== Early life and education ==
Mercado's first exposure to music was through the classical records that his grandfather left to him when he died. He started to play the guitar when he was 9 and four years later, he started the piano. His uncle, Marcelo González, gave him his first piano as a gift. Mercado first took a special interest in jazz when he saw Keith Jarrett performing at Nezahualcóyotl Concert Hall. After the death of his father, he started to develop his style.

Mercado's first piano teacher was José Luis Arcaráz, who studied at the National Conservatory of Music of México. Then he took a music course at Superior School of Music in Mexico City with Francisco Téllez. In 1994, his improvisation skills were recognized by Berklee College of Music, which he attended after receiving a scholarship to study piano.

== Career ==
After he graduated from Berklee, Mercado worked in the U.S., playing piano in a cruise ship, accompanying opera singers and performing as a backup musician on several recordings. He then returned to Mexico, where he worked as a music teacher.

Mercado recorded his first album The Watcher in 2012, along with Aaron Cruz and Gabriel Puentes. The newspaper La Jornada praised the album, citing his "impeccable instrumental technique". Soon after, he was invited to perform at festivals and other presentations inside and outside of Mexico.

Mercado toured in Mexico both as a solo player and with the Alex Mercado Trío between 2013 and 2016.

For his second album, his compositions earned him financial support from the Fondo Nacional para la Cultura y las Artes (FONCA). This album, Symbiosis, was self-released in 2014. Here, he played with Mexican drummer, Antonio Sánchez and American double bassist, Scott Colley, both of whom were active in the New York jazz scene. Symbiosis was recorded at Systems Two Recording Studio in Brooklyn, New York City. Mercado's style on this album, according to Music Life Magazine, "combines resources of traditional jazz and contemporary improvisation". Symbiosis was reviewed by Downbeat Magazine.

In the fall of 2015, Mercado released a piano solo album called Refraction, in which he incorporated contemporary jazz with classical atmospheres. He then embarked on a tour around some countries in Europe. He toured in Ireland inand later embarked on the Alex Mercado Pueblos Mágicos Tour with American trombonist Doug Beavers.

Both Downbeat Magazine and La Jornada have named Mercado among the best Mexican jazz musicians. Most recently he is working in the Mexican jazz scene as a backup musician.

=== Festivals ===
Mercado has performed at a number of jazz festivals, including Jazzbook II Festival in 2012 & 2013, JazzMex Festival in 2013, Colima Jazz Festival in 2013; EuroJazz, Aguascalientes Jazz Festival, Pachuca Jazz Festival, Bellas Artes's "Por lo Tanto Jazz de Música y Opera" Festival, and JazzTam Fest in 2014; Polanco Jazz Festival in 2014 & 2015, Las Almas de Texcoco Festival, International Jazz Exhibition of Coyoacán, International Jazz and Blues Festival of Zacatecas, Puebla's 5 de Mayo International Jazz Festival, International Jazz Exhibition of Monterrey, and International Jazz Exhibition of Morelos in 2015.

== Discography ==
=== As Leader ===
==== Trio Album ====
- The Watcher (2012)
- Symbiosis (2014)
- Paisajes (2017)
- Exilio (2020)

==== Piano Solo ====
- Refraction (2015)

=== As Sideman (Backup Musician) ===
==== With Magos Herrera ====
- Distancia (2009)
- Mexico Azul (2010)

==== With Louise Phelan ====
- Song of a Darkned Room (2013)
- Moments of Light (2014)

==== With Julia Vari ====
- Canciones del Mundo en Jazz (2013)
- Adoro (2015)

==== With other artists ====
- Deseo del Tiempo by Andrea Básef (2012)
- My Miracle by Dannah Garay (2014)
- Interview by Marc Osterer (2014)
- MFM by Yaury Hernández (2014)
- Un Amor Pendiente by Cardencheros de Sapioriz (2015)
- Punto de partida by Amanda Tovalin (2016)
