= Keep It Going =

Studio album by Mad Caddies
- Released: May 1, 2007
- Genres: Ska punk, alternative rock, pop punk, reggae
- Length: 49:09
- Label: Fat Wreck Chords

Mad Caddies chronology
Songs In The Key Of Eh! (2004)	Keep It Going (2007)	Consentual Selections (2010)

Professional ratings
Review scores
Source	Rating
AbsolutePunk	(88%)
PopMatters	5/10
Visions	9/12
Ox-Fanzine	7/10

Keep It Going is the fifth full-length studio album by California ska punk band Mad Caddies, released on May 1, 2007 on CD. It was pressed on vinyl in 2014 in both colored and black variants.

Keep It Going features production work from Grammy Award-winning producer Wayne Jobson (No Doubt, Gregory Isaacs, Toots & the Maytals) and a guest appearance from reggae musician Duckie Simpson (Black Uhuru) on a cover of Delroy Wilson's song "Riding For a Fall". The album features additional guest appearances by trumpeter Dana Heitman, organist Dustin Lanker, and saxophonists Ian Early and Sean Flannery, all of the Oregon rock/ska/swing band the Cherry Poppin' Daddies.

The cover art is a photo of the Spirit of New Orleans Brass Band, led by Layton Martens (19 February 1943 – 18 March 2000), who is at left on trombone. Anthony "Tuba Fats" Lacen (15 September 1950 – 11 January 2004) stands at right.

== Track listing ==
All tracks are written by Mad Caddies, unless otherwise noted.

No.	Title	Writer(s)	Length
1.	"The Dirge"	Dustin Lanker, Mad Caddies	1:53
2.	"Backyard"		3:01
3.	"State of Mind"		3:46
4.	"Today"		2:39
5.	"Without You"		3:07
6.	"Reflections"		3:13
7.	"Lay Your Head Down"		3:28
8.	"Tired Bones"		2:53
9.	"Coyote"		4:10
10.	"Don't Go"		3:01
11.	"Pyramid Scheme"		2:27
12.	"Souls for Sale"		3:42
13.	"Riding for a Fall"	Dodd, Wilson	4:39
14.	"Whatcha Gonna Do"		3:08
15.	"End Dirge"		4:02
Total length:			49:09
