= The Holiday Has Been Cancelled =

EP by Mad Caddies
- Released: June 6, 2000
- Recorded: 2000
- Genre: Ska punk
- Length: 12:55
- Label: Fat Wreck Chords
- Producer: Mad Caddies

Mad Caddies chronology
Duck and Cover (1998)	The Holiday Has Been Cancelled (2000)	Rock the Plank (2001)

Professional ratings
Review scores
Source	Rating
Visions	
Ox-Fanzine	
Punknews.org	3.5/5 stars

The Holiday Has Been Cancelled is the first EP from the Mad Caddies. It was released on June 6, 2000.

== Track listing ==
1. "Falling Down" – 3:09
2. "Nobody Wins at the Laundromat" – 1:59
3. "Something's Wrong at the Playground" – 2:10
4. "Destro" – 2:25
5. "S.O.S." – 3:12
