= Brian Lanker =

American photographer

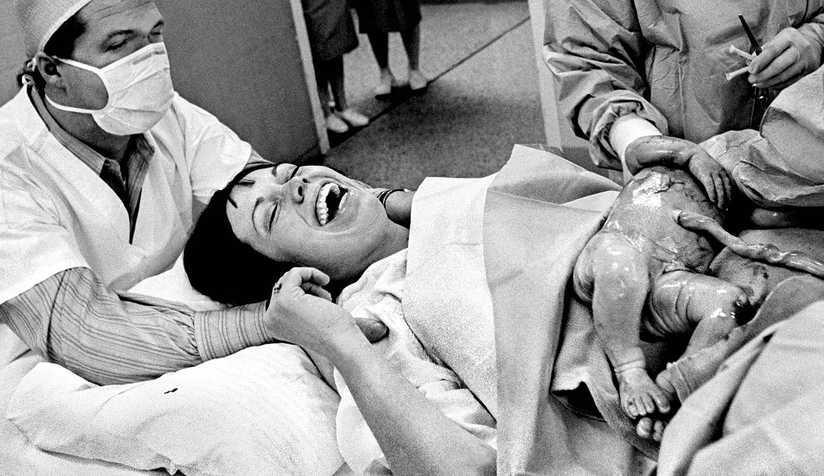
"Moment of Life", cited as the exemplary photo in the sequence for which Lanker received the Pulitzer Prize

Brian Lanker (August 31, 1947 – March 13, 2011) was an American photographer. Brian Lanker’s early roots in newspaper photojournalism began at the Topeka Capital-Journal. He won the 1973 Pulitzer Prize for Feature Photography for a black-and-white photo essay on childbirth for The Topeka Capital-Journal, including the photograph "Moment of Life". Lanker died at his home in Eugene, Oregon on March 13, 2011, after a brief bout of pancreatic cancer. He was 63.

His work appeared in Life and Sports Illustrated, as well as book projects, including I Dream a World: Portraits of Black Women Who Changed America, Shall we dance, They Drew Fire, and Track Town, USA.

The debut exhibition for I Dream A World: Portraits of Black Women Who Changed America at the Corcoran Gallery of Art in Washington D.C. set attendance records for the 111 year old museum.

Lanker considered his greatest honor to be his inclusion, alongside W. Eugene Smith, Henri Cartier-Bresson and Eliot Porter, in Images of Man, an audiovisual educational programme.

He directed his first documentary film, They Drew Fire: Combat Artists of WWII, a highly acclaimed PBS prime time program in 1998. His book Shall we dance was published in 2008. He was the graphics director for The Register-Guard newspaper in Eugene from 1974 to 1982. He received a Candace Award from the National Coalition of 100 Black Women in 1991.

Lanker is the father of musician Dustin Lanker.

== Works ==
- Lanker, Brian (1999). I Dream a World: Portraits of Black Women Who Changed America. New York: Stewart, Tabori and Chang. ISBN 1-55670-923-4.
- Lanker, Brian (2000). They Drew Fire: Combat Artists of WWII. New York: TV Books LLC. ISBN 1-57500-085-7.
- Lanker, Brian (2008). Shall we dance. San Francisco: Chronicle Books LLC. ISBN 978-0-8118-6231-8.
- Lanker, Brian (2015). From The Heart: The Photographs of Brian Lanker. Eugene: Jordan Schnitzer Museum of Art, University of Oregon. ISBN 978-0-9903533-4-8.
