= Quality Soft Core =

Studio album by Mad Caddies
- Released: May 13, 1997
- Recorded: 1997
- Genres: Third wave ska, ska punk
- Length: 36:34
- Label: Honest Don's
- Producer: Mad Caddies

Mad Caddies chronology
Quality Soft Core (1997)	Duck and Cover (1998)

Professional ratings
Review scores
Source	Rating
Visions	8/12
Ox-Fanzine	

Quality Soft Core is the first full-length release from the Mad Caddies.

== Track listing ==
All tracks are written by Mad Caddies.

No.	Title	Length
1.	"I'm So Alone"	4:10
2.	"Distress"	3:49
3.	"Cup O' Tea"	1:44
4.	"The Bell Tower"	2:42
5.	"No Sé"	2:41
6.	"Crew Cut Chuck"	1:56
7.	"Goleta"	1:24
8.	"Big Brother"	3:25
9.	"LG's"	3:20
10.	"Polyester Khakis"	2:20
11.	"Preppie Girl"	2:35
12.	"Mum's The Word"	1:38
13.	"Sad Reggie"	4:50
Total length:		36:34

== Personnel ==
- Chuck Robinson – Vocals
- Carter Benson – Guitar
- Sascha Lazor – Guitar, production
- Mark Iversen – Bass
- Todd Rosenberg – Drums
- Eduardo Hernandez – Trombone
- Angus Cooke - Production
- Mark Castleman - Mastering
