= Rock the Plank =

Studio album by Mad Caddies
- Released: April 10, 2001
- Recorded: 2001
- Genre: Punk rock, pop punk
- Length: 37:14
- Label: Fat Wreck Chords
- Producer: Mad Caddies

Mad Caddies chronology
The Holiday Has Been Cancelled (2000)	Rock the Plank (2001)	Just One More (2003)

Professional ratings
Review scores
Source	Rating
Visions	7/12
Ox-Fanzine	

Rock the Plank is the third full-length release from the Mad Caddies.

== Track listing ==
1. "Shaving Your Life" - 2:06 (music: Benson; lyrics: Benson, Robertson)
2. "Mary Melody" - 3:09 (music: Lazor, Robertson; lyrics: Robertson)
3. "B-Side" - 2:58 (Robertson)
4. "Days Away" - 3:44 (Robertson)
5. "Bridges" - 2:41 (Robertson)
6. "We'll Start to Worry When the Cynics Start Believing" - 3:17 (Benson)
7. "Weird Beard" - 2:44 (music: Lazor; lyrics: Robertson)
8. "Easy Cheese" - 2:17 (Robertson)
9. "Hound Bound" - 3:38 (music: Robertson, Lazor; lyrics: Robertson)
10. "Depleted Salvo" - 2:59 (music: Benson; lyrics: Robertson)
11. "Chevy Novacaine" - 2:39 (music: Benson; lyrics: Robertson)
12. "Booze Cruise" - 2:25 (music: Benson; lyrics: Benson, Robertson)
13. "All American Badass" - 2:41 (music: Lazor; lyrics: Robertson)
