= Duck and Cover (album) =

Studio album by Mad Caddies
- Released: August 11, 1998
- Recorded: 1998
- Genre: Ska punk
- Length: 35:07
- Label: Fat Wreck Chords
- Producer: Mad Caddies

Mad Caddies chronology
| Quality Soft Core (1997) | Duck and Cover (1998) | The Holiday Has Been Cancelled (2000) |

Professional ratings
Review scores
| Source | Rating |
|---|---|
| Punknews.org | 5/5 stars |
| Visions | 4/12 |
| Ox-Fanzine | |

Duck and Cover is the second full-length album from the Mad Caddies. It was released in 1998 by Fat Wreck Chords.

== Track listing ==
1. "Road Rash" – 2:01
2. "The Gentleman" – 2:15
3. "No Hope" – 1:26
4. "One Shot" – 4:52
5. "Macho Nachos" – 3:17
6. "Monkeys" – 2:45
7. "Econoline" – 2:14
8. "The Joust" – 3:46
9. "Betty" – 3:21
10. "aPathetic" – 2:14
11. "Medium Unwell" – 3:03
12. "Popcorn" – 3:53
