= Just One More (album) =

Studio album by Mad Caddies
- Released: March 11, 2003
- Recorded: 2003
- Studio: Motor Studios, Orange Whip Studios
- Genre: Ska punk
- Length: 44:08
- Label: Fat Wreck Chords
- Producer: Mad Caddies

Mad Caddies chronology
Rock the Plank (2001)	Just One More (2003)	Songs in the Key of Eh! (2004)

Professional ratings
Review scores
Source	Rating
AllMusic	4.5/5 stars
Visions	8/12
Ox-Fanzine	
Punknews.org	2/5 stars

Just One More is the fourth full-length release from the Mad Caddies. This album mixes much ska, punk, reggae, and even a little polka as well. The subject matter throughout this CD in comparison to their others is significantly more serious.

== Track listing ==
No.	Title	Length
1.	"Drinking For 11"	3:55
2.	"Contraband"	1:19
3.	"Villains"	2:14
4.	"Silence"	2:49
5.	"Just One More"	3:26
6.	"Day By Day"	2:47
7.	"Leavin"	2:59
8.	"Rockupation"	3:04
9.	"Last Breath"	3:21
10.	"Spare Change?"	3:09
11.	"Riot"	2:28
12.	"10 West"	3:05
13.	"Good Intentions"	3:04
14.	"Wet Dog"	3:09
15.	"Game Show"	3:19
Total length:		44:08

All songs written by Mad Caddies

== Personnel ==
Mad Caddies

- Chuck Robertson – vocals
- Sascha Lazor – guitar, banjo
- Mark Iversen – bass
- Keith Douglas – trumpet, background vocals
- Ed Hernandez – trombone
- Brian Flenniken – drums

Guest musicians

- Spike Slawson – additional vocals
- Lynda Mandolyn – additional vocals
- Logan Livermore – additional vocals
- Leon Zegetinbigger – additional guitar
- Austin Beleone – organ

Production

- Eddie Schreyer – mastering (all tracks)

For tracks 4, 6–10, 13 & 15

- Angus Cooke – engineer, producer
- Mark Casselman – engineer, producer
- Mad Caddies – producers

For tracks 1–3, 5, 11, 12 & 14

- Mad Caddies – producers
- Ryan Greene – producer, engineer
- Adam Krammer – additional engineering
