= Steve Perry (Oregon musician) =

American musician (born 1963)

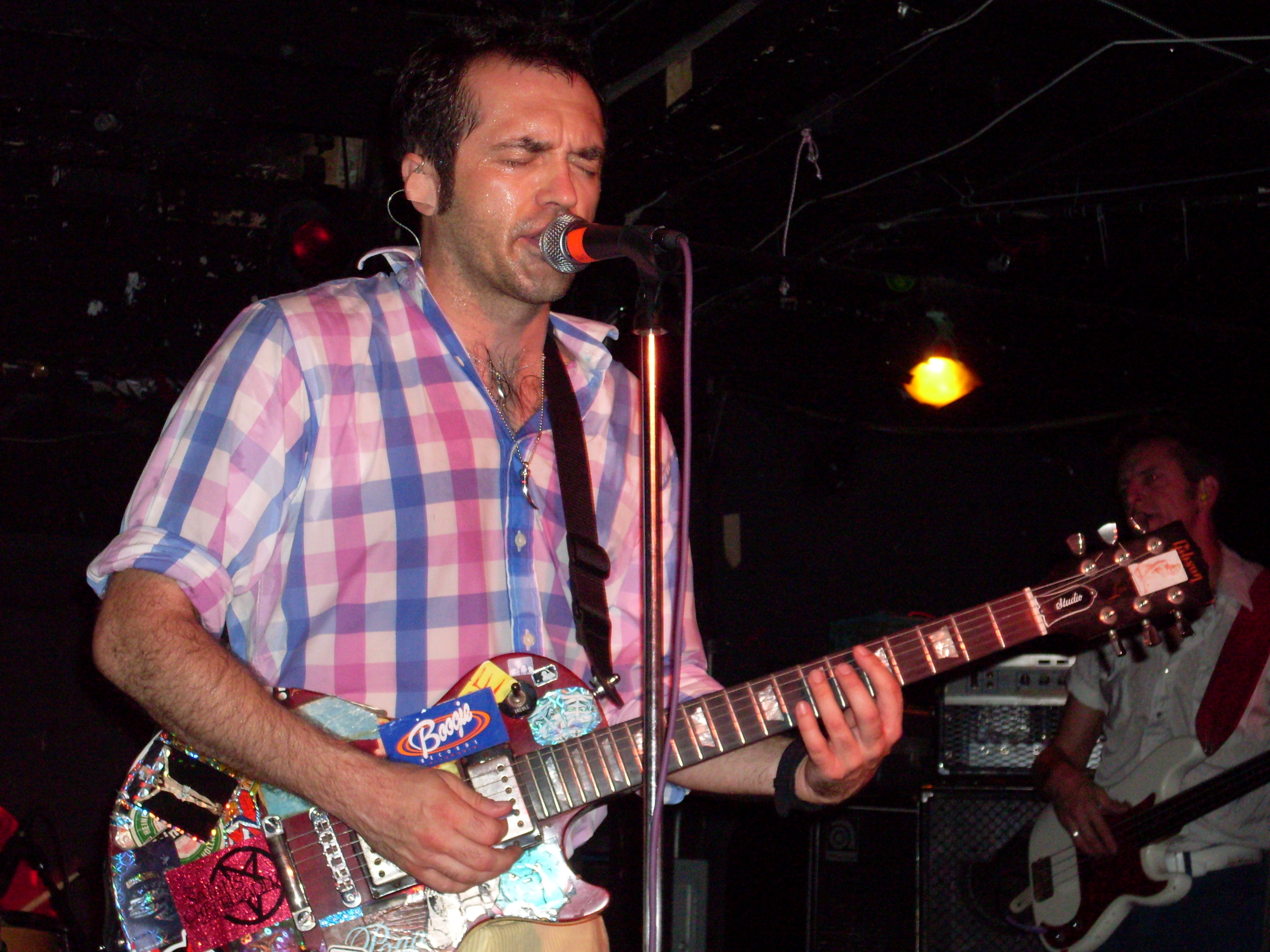
- Perry performing with the Cherry Poppin' Daddies in 2009

Background information
- Also known as: MC Large Drink; Buddy Love; Count d'Monet
- Born: Stephen Henry Perry; October 8, 1963 (age 63); Syracuse, New York
- Genres: Rock, ska, swing, ska punk
- Occupations: Singer, songwriter, record producer, biologist
- Instruments: Vocals, rhythm guitar, theremin
- Years active: 1983–present
- Label: Space Age Bachelor Pad
- Website: daddies.com

Stephen Henry Perry (born October 8, 1963) is an American musician, best known as lead singer, songwriter and rhythm guitarist for the Oregon ska-swing band Cherry Poppin' Daddies.

== Early life ==
Perry was born in Syracuse, New York, to a physicist and a social worker, and raised in Apalachin, outside the industrial city of Binghamton. He described Binghamton as being "a poor, run down, loner-class town", which would later serve as a significant influence on his songwriting.

After graduating from Vestal High School in 1981, Perry moved to Eugene, Oregon, to pursue track and field and chemistry in the Honors College at the University of Oregon, where he befriended fellow student Dan Schmid. After being exposed to the Northwest punk and hardcore scene, Perry became inspired to follow a path as a musician, teaching himself guitar at age 20. Finding himself more interested in "drinking beer and going to punk rock shows" than attending college, Perry dropped out in his junior year in 1983 and formed the punk trio The Jazz Greats with Schmid and drummer Joe Brooks. Perry was also briefly involved with Snakepit alongside Billy Karren, Joe Preston, Laura Mcdougall and Al Larsen before performing with the Paisley Underground-styled band Saint Huck with Schmid and drummer Tim Arnold from 1984 to 1987. That trio went on to form what would become the Cherry Poppin' Daddies in late 1988.

== Cherry Poppin' Daddies ==
After emerging as a successful regional band and eventually becoming a consistent staple of the West Coast third wave ska touring circuit, the Daddies broke into the musical mainstream with their 1997 album Zoot Suit Riot, a compilation of swing songs culled from the band's first three albums. The album sold over two million copies in the United States and helped launch the short-lived swing revival of the late 1990s, and brought the Daddies into the limelight. Nevertheless, Perry has often expressed contempt for the band's period of temporary fame, citing frustration over what he claimed was persistent and lingering media typecasting of the Daddies as a generic "retro swing band" at the expense of their dominant ska punk influences. Additionally, Perry has also talked about the socially alienating effects fame had on his personal life, claiming it to have negatively changed relationships with friends and even subjected him to occasional heckling from strangers who recognized him in public. In recent years, however, Perry has retrospectively called the success of Zoot Suit Riot "a blessing" for giving the band and himself the financial stability to continue; as he put it, "no more blocks of government cheese".

== Personal life ==
During the Daddies' hiatus in late 2000, Perry temporarily relocated to Manhattan for the better part of two years to be closer to his family and "chill anonymously". Upon moving back to Eugene, Perry re-enrolled at the University of Oregon, pursuing an undergraduate degree in molecular biology, graduating in 2004 with a Bachelor of Science. During this time, Perry was also active singing in the glam rock band White Hot Odyssey, a side project he started with Daddies guitarist Jason Moss in 2002. White Hot Odyssey released a self-titled album on Jive Records in 2004 before disbanding the following year.

Perry lived in Eugene with his wife Yvette and their daughter, and works in a biology laboratory. In 2014, Perry publicly announced that Yvette was diagnosed with stage IV colorectal cancer at age 41; since then, he has regularly discussed her ongoing treatments through the Daddies' social media accounts, as well as promoting awareness of and organizations dedicated to colorectal cancer. Yvette Perry died in January, 2026.

== Songwriting and influences ==
See: Cherry Poppin' Daddies#Musical style and lyricism

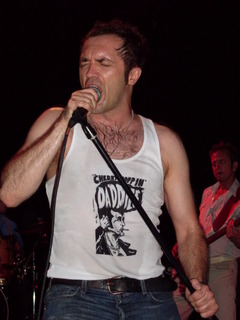
Perry performing with the Daddies in 2009

Since forming the band, Perry has acted as the sole lyricist, primary composer and producer of the Daddies' music. According to Jason Moss in regard to the band's songwriting process, Perry writes nearly every aspect of the Daddies' music, first composing the basic chords of each song on his guitar and then working with each member of the band to build upon his ideas for drum beats, horn lines, bass lines, and lead guitar riffs.

In concert, Perry primarily played a Gibson Les Paul, but since the early 2000s has alternated with a Flying V, while in recent videos he can also be seen playing a Fender Jazzmaster. In late 2009, in promotion of the Rock Ridge Music releases of Susquehanna and Skaboy JFK, Perry teamed up with Gibson to promote the company's limited-edition SG Zoot Suit guitar, appearing in several picture advertisements. The guitar was later featured in the music video for the Daddies' 2019 single "Gym Rat", albeit played by band member Zak Johnson.

Perry lists a diverse field of influences. Having started out in punk rock, he has expressed admiration for bands including the Meat Puppets, Bad Brains, The Stooges, Suicidal Tendencies and in particular the Portland-based Wipers; in a 1997 interview, Perry listed the Wipers' 1983 album Over the Edge as his all-time favorite record. He has also listed Elvis Costello, The Kinks, Fishbone, Captain Beefheart and Little Richard among his inspirations, the latter of whom Perry has described as his "first real idol". Perry cites his love of swing and jazz having started with being given a copy of The Smithsonian Collection of Classic Jazz as a gift, and has repeatedly listed Duke Ellington, Jimmie Lunceford and Fletcher Henderson as his biggest jazz influences.

== Discography ==
Cherry Poppin' Daddies

See Cherry Poppin' Daddies discography for complete listing

- Ferociously Stoned (1990) – vocals (as MC Large Drink)
- Rapid City Muscle Car (1994) – vocals
- Kids on the Street (1996) – vocals, guitar
- Zoot Suit Riot (1997) – vocals, guitar
- Soul Caddy (2000) – vocals, guitar, keyboard effects, stylophone
- Susquehanna (2008) – vocals, guitar, keyboards
- Skaboy JFK (2009) – vocals, guitar
- White Teeth, Black Thoughts (2013) – vocals, guitar, washboard
- Please Return the Evening (2014) – vocals, guitar
- The Boop-A-Doo (2016) – vocals
- Bigger Life (2019) – vocals, guitar, keyboards, vibraphone, percussion
- At the Pink Rat (2024) - vocals, piano, bass, vibraphone
- Roma! Roma! (2026) - vocals, guitar, keys, bouzouki, accordion, percussion
- Daughters of Montezuma (2026) - vocals, guitar, bass, keys

White Hot Odyssey

- White Hot Odyssey (2004) – vocals, guitar (as Le Count d' Monet)

Miscellaneous

- Beenie Man – Art and Life – backing vocals on "Ola"
