= Susquehanna (album) =

Studio album by Cherry Poppin' Daddies
- Released: February 19, 2008
- Recorded: June–July 2007
- Length: 45:25
- Labels: Space Age Bachelor Pad; Rock Ridge (2009)
- Producer: Steve Perry

Cherry Poppin' Daddies chronology
Soul Caddy (2000)	Susquehanna (2008)	Skaboy JFK (2009)

Alternate album covers
- Alternate artwork

Susquehanna is the fifth studio album by the Cherry Poppin' Daddies, released by Space Age Bachelor Pad Records on February 19, 2008 digitally, physically on June 10, 2008, and reissued by Rock Ridge Music on September 29, 2009.

Susquehanna marked the band's return to recording after nearly a decade following their hiatus in 2000 and sporadic touring throughout 2002–2006. The album follows the eclectic format of previous records, with Latin and Caribbean-influences in addition to the band's usual swing, ska, and rock.

== Overview ==
Susquehanna is influenced by Latin and Caribbean music, incorporating flamenco ("Roseanne"), soca ("Tom the Lion"), bossa nova ("Breathe"), Latin rock ("Bust Out"), and reggae ("Blood Orange Sun") with swing, ska, and rockabilly. While the majority of the album is original, a notable exception is a re-recording of "Hi and Lo", a ska punk song written by Daddies frontman Steve Perry for The Mighty Mighty Bosstones in the mid-1990s, ending up as part of the Daddies' own repertoire and becoming a staple of their live shows.

Perry explained that the album's tropical slant was due to his prediction that one day "American pop will owe a huge debt to world sensibilities...these I wanted to explore and potentially boil down to some fundamental building blocks that might lead toward a new, more international style". Stylistically, Perry claimed that he based the structure of Susquehanna on James Joyce's Ulysses in that each of the songs were written in a different style and genre but the album was thematically coherent. He elaborated that he drew inspiration from Jean-Luc Godard's 1965 film Pierrot le fou in that "songs are a means to an end. Genres reflect off each other". "It's like a little movie, doing what I always do with genres, which is to use them kind of like paint. I use various genres and grind them against each other. I like to put a flamenco song next to a song that's a glam rock song next to a song that's a swing song, so that the flavor changes."

Like most of the Daddies' previous albums, Susquehanna is written as a loose concept album. Described by Perry as a portrait of "various relationships in decay", each song deals with memories, all written in the format of an abstract narrative following a character in the aftermath of a broken relationship. Perry has summarized Susquehanna as being about "losses and continuing on. It's about love, doubt and fatigue...and ultimately about gratitude".

== Production history ==
News of a new Daddies studio album first surfaced in mid-2006 during a radio interview with Steve Perry. He confirmed that a new album was in the process of being written and would cover some new territory for the band, drawing on Latin, tropical and reggae sounds, though it would contain a few swing tracks as well. Most of this new material was debuted during the band's 2006 US tour. On February 9, 2007, the band released a collection of demo songs available for purchase: the reggae-tinged "Blood Orange Sun", the Latin-inspired "Bust Out", and the flamenco ballad "Roseanne".

According to a blog on the band's official MySpace page, recording began on the 25th of June. By September 5, the record was finally tracked but not fully mixed, and given the title Susquehanna, after the river near where Perry grew up (up until then, the album went under a number of working titles, including Truth & Consequences and The Good Things). Perry confirmed that there were 12 tracks on the album, and that they were "...all part of the same story..... does that make it a rock opera, concept album or just a bunch of stuff that happened?"

Susquehanna was released via digital download through the Daddies' website on February 19, 2008, before being made available in a limited CD pressing on June 10, 2008. Both formats of the album were available to purchase exclusively through the band's website until their signing to independent label Rock Ridge Music in 2009, when Susquehanna was re-issued and given national distribution on September 29, 2009, in conjuncture with the Daddies' ska compilation Skaboy JFK.

== Response ==
Professional ratings
Review scores
Source	Rating
AbsolutePunk	86%
Allmusic	3.5/5 stars
PopMatters (2008)	4/10
PopMatters (2009)	8/10

Critical reception of Susquehanna ranged from mixed to positive. While its low-profile release went mostly unnoticed by major media outlets, various internet publications were polarized over the album's multi-genre format, either praising the band for their musical experimentation or criticizing them as inconsistent. AbsolutePunk.net awarded the album an 86% rating, stating "there are only good things to say about the Cherry Poppin' Daddies new album", calling it "full of fun and surprisingly entertaining". Metro Spirit delivered most of the praise on Perry's "secret weapon" voice, adding "being backed by a blistering horn section and hotshit guitar player certainly doesn’t hurt either". Blogcritics also gave the album a positive review, describing it as "pleasurable listening", and in a later re-reviewing of the re-release, lauded the album's narrative concept and lyrical interconnectedness as an "amazing undertaking".

On the opposite end of the critical spectrum, Allmusic gave Susquehanna a rating of 3.5/5, claiming that it lacked "oomph or punch" and the band ultimately "leave[s] the listener with little pop". Reax Music Magazine noted that the only tunes the reviewer felt succeeded were the ones that stuck to the band's original swing formula, while PopMatters called Perry's songwriting attempts at being multi-genre "jumbled", "smug" and "flat-out overstuffed", though praising "Hi and Lo" as being "absolutely extraordinary". In a 2009 re-review by a separate author, the album was given a score of 8/10, citing the blend of genres as "the truest overall representation of the band" and the Daddies' "best work so far".

== Track listing ==
All tracks are written by Steve Perry.

No.	Title	Length
1.	"Bust Out"	4:08
2.	"The Mongoose and the Snake"	3:20
3.	"Hi and Lo"	3:39
4.	"Blood Orange Sun"	3:20
5.	"White Trash Toodle-oo"	2:39
6.	"Julie Grave"	3:24
7.	"Roseanne"	3:10
8.	"Hammerblow"	3:00
9.	"Tom the Lion"	4:08
10.	"Wingtips"	4:10
11.	"Breathe"	4:00
12.	"The Good Things"	3:40
13.	"Arráncate"	4:07
Total length:		45:25

=== Previous availability ===
- A previous studio version of "Hi and Lo" appeared on Vacationing in Palm Springs (1997), a split 7-inch with Reel Big Fish.

== Personnel ==
Cherry Poppin' Daddies

- Steve Perry - vocals, guitar, keyboards
- Dana Heitman - trumpet
- Dan Schmid - bass
- Jason Moss - guitar
- Sean Flannery - tenor and bari saxophones
- Dustin Lanker - keyboards, vocals
- Tim Donahue - drums
- Joe Manis - alto and bari saxophones

Additional musicians

- Billy Barnett - guitar, bass
- Jaime Woods - acoustic guitar
- Rose Woods - castanets, wood floor flamenco
- Ishi Woods - cajón, percussion
- Ricardo Cardenas - guitar
- Tim Clark - trumpet
- Glenn Bonny - trombone
- Glenn Griffith - trombone
- Lydia Van Dreel - French horn
- Dale Bradley - cello
- Kristin Halay - flute

Production

- Mastered by Brad Blackwood at Euphonic Mastering, Memphis, Tennessee
- Recorded and mixed by Billy Barnett at Gung Ho Studios in Eugene, Oregon
