= Zoot Suit Riot (album) =

Zoot Suit Riot: The Swingin' Hits of the Cherry Poppin' Daddies

Compilation album by Cherry Poppin' Daddies
- Released: March 18, 1997
- Recorded: 1989–1997
- Studio: Gung Ho Studios
- Genre: Swing
- Length: 51:28
- Label: Space Age Bachelor Pad, Mojo
- Producer: Steve Perry, Cherry Poppin' Daddies

Cherry Poppin' Daddies chronology
Kids on the Street (1996)	Zoot Suit Riot: The Swingin' Hits of the Cherry Poppin' Daddies (1997)	Soul Caddy (2000)

Singles from Zoot Suit Riot
- 1. "Zoot Suit Riot" Released: October 1997; 2. "Brown Derby Jump" Released: 1998; 3. "Here Comes the Snake" Released: 1998

Zoot Suit Riot: The Swingin' Hits of the Cherry Poppin' Daddies is a compilation album by the American band the Cherry Poppin' Daddies, released on March 18, 1997, by Space Age Bachelor Pad Records. The album is a collection of swing and jazz-influenced songs from the band's first three studio albums, along with four bonus tracks recorded especially for this compilation.

After an independent release in early 1997, Zoot Suit Riot was reissued by Universal Records subsidiary Mojo Records the following summer. By early 1998, regular radio airplay of the album's lead single "Zoot Suit Riot" helped propel the album to #1 on Billboard's Top Heatseekers chart and eventually the top 20 of the Billboard 200, contributing to the swing revival of the late 1990s. By January 2000, Zoot Suit Riot had achieved double-platinum status of over two million copies sold in the United States, while also attaining gold record sales in Canada and New Zealand.

== Background ==
By 1996, having spent seven years performing within the Northwest punk and ska underground, the Cherry Poppin' Daddies had independently released three studio albums while steadily gaining recognition in the American ska scene at a time when the genre was beginning to generate mainstream commercial interest on the heels of bands such as No Doubt and Sublime. At this time, largely following the success of the 1996 film Swingers, which prominently showcased the Los Angeles swing revival movement, public attention also started turning towards swing music, which had been slowly emerging within the west coast alternative underground pioneered by bands such as Royal Crown Revue and Big Bad Voodoo Daddy.

Though the Daddies has been a better-known presence in the ska scene, the band eventually began drawing a sizable audience for their swing songs as they continued to tour alongside ska bands. Facing an unexpected demand for their swing music - which until then had only been a partial component of their repertoire behind punk, funk and ska - the Daddies realized they lacked an album which fully represented their swing and jazz influences, and more so lacked the finances to record a new one. Singer-songwriter Steve Perry explained how the concept of a compilation came to be in an interview for The Daily of the University of Washington:

We didn't want to be a "swing band". What happened was that our manager said, "Everybody comes up and they ask me which CD has the most swing on it," - that's what we mostly played live - "and I don't know what the fuck to tell them because two of the CDs have the same amount and the other has less. So it's between these, and I don't know what to do. I swear to God, if you put all of those swing songs on one record, people would just shit. They would really want that, because how many people have all three Cherry Poppin' Daddies records?" "Well, none." "Well, yeah. There you go." And I went, "I don't think that a band from Eugene with three records could put a greatest hits record out." "Then record some new songs." We had talked about it for a while, and we decided to do it. And it was cheap. So we did it.

== Release ==
Recording for the album's bonus tracks took place in late 1996, and according to accounts by Perry, was hurried and carried out on a tight budget as the band "didn't have much bread to record". In several instances, only single takes were used: at the end of the album's titular song, Perry is heard saying "I think I'm about ready to sing it now", which he was signifying to the engineer after doing his first run-through of the song. The engineer instead told him it was a decent take and suggested keeping his comment in the final mix as an inside joke, to which Perry ultimately agreed ("Unbeknownst to us, it became a big hit record").

Zoot Suit Riot was released through the Daddies' self-operated record label Space Age Bachelor Pad Records on March 18, 1997. In its initial pressing, the album became an unexpectedly popular item, reportedly selling as many as 4,000 copies a week through both the band's tours and their Northwest distributors. Despite steady regional sales, obtaining wider distribution and marketing outside of the Northwest proved difficult through the band's entirely DIY label. Following a national tour together, ska band Reel Big Fish helped arrange a meeting between the Daddies and their label Mojo Records in an attempt to score the band a distribution deal, negotiations of which instead led to the Daddies being signed to a record contract. Zoot Suit Riot was re-issued and given national distribution by Mojo on July 1, 1997, less than four months after its original release.

By October 1997, the rising mainstream popularity of swing music had resulted in consistently steady sales of Zoot Suit Riot, motivating Mojo to release the album's title track as a single and distribute it among modern rock radio stations. The Daddies, who were in preparation over recording a new studio album, ardently protested Mojo's decision under the belief that a swing song would never receive airplay on mainstream radio and the band would likely have to recoup the costs of its marketing. Nevertheless, Mojo persisted, and to the band's surprise, "Zoot Suit Riot" soon found regular rotation on both college radio and major stations such as Los Angeles' influential KROQ-FM.

=== Mainstream breakthrough ===
"Zoot Suit Riot"
Sample of "Zoot Suit Riot", the album's breakout single.

Following several months of steady radio airplay coupled with the Daddies' extensive touring schedule, Zoot Suit Riot eventually climbed to the #1 spot on Billboard's Top Heatseekers chart, going on to become the first album of the swing revival to crack the top 40 of the Billboard 200 and peaking at #17, spending an ultimate total of 53 weeks on the charts. In June 1998, the album achieved gold status after surpassing sales of 500,000 copies, reaching platinum status of over one million records sold two months later on August 25. On January 28, 2000, Zoot Suit Riot was awarded double platinum status after selling over two million copies.

The album's lead single, "Zoot Suit Riot", became a moderate radio hit, reaching #41 on the Hot 100 and appearing on numerous compilation albums, notably the very first US installment of Now That's What I Call Music!, while the surrealistic music video, directed by Gregory Dark and edited by Bob Murawski, earned a nomination for a "Best New Artist in a Video" award at the 1998 MTV Video Music Awards. Two additional singles were issued from Zoot Suit Riot, "Brown Derby Jump", for which a music video was filmed, and a remixed version of "Here Comes the Snake" from the Daddies' 1996 album Kids on the Street, though both singles failed to chart. According to Perry in a 2016 Tweet, "Drunk Daddy" was intended to be the second single released from Zoot Suit Riot, but at the time Seagram had controlling interest in MCA and Universal Music Group, and the band's proposal of issuing a single about a violent alcoholic father was dismissed.

Once Zoot Suit Riot began rising up the charts in early 1998, Mojo insisted that the Daddies immediately began touring behind it, forcing the band to abandon their follow-up studio album which they had already started recording. With a successful headlining tour of the United States supported by The Pietasters and Ozomatli, a North American tour opening for Los Fabulosos Cadillacs and international touring as part of the 1998 Vans Warped Tour, the Daddies ultimately toured behind Zoot Suit Riot for over a year, playing nearly 300 shows in 1998 alone. During this time, the band also made high-profile appearances on major television shows including The Tonight Show with Jay Leno, Late Show with David Letterman, The View and Dick Clark's New Year's Rockin' Eve, each time performing their hit single "Zoot Suit Riot".

By the end of the decade, both Zoot Suit Riot and the Daddies' mainstream popularity declined with that of the swing revival. The album last appeared on the Billboard 200 on the week of February 27, 1999, charting at #193 before slipping off entirely.

== Reception ==
Professional ratings
Review scores
Source	Rating
AllMusic	2.5/5 stars
Robert Christgau	(dud)

Despite the album's commercial success, Zoot Suit Riot met with largely mixed reactions from mainstream critics. Of the positive reviews, The Los Angeles Times, comparing albums by the most popular groups of the swing revival, chose the Daddies as having "the most effective music for the dance fad of the moment", citing the band's "suggestive lyrics and occasionally interesting musical textures" as their most distinguishing quality. The New York Times described the Daddies as "one of the few neo-swing bands that can win over a skeptic with their rhythm section", noting Perry's lyricism as having "an inventiveness missing from most of the other swing bands' lyrics".

Stephen Thomas Erlewine of AllMusic, however, gave the album a rating of 2.5 out of 5 stars, noting that while the Daddies pulled off "reasonably infectious" tunes, the modernist lyrics had lent Zoot Suit Riot a "condescending Gen-X attitude, as well as a lack of understanding about what made swing fun", writing the album off as a "smirking hipster joke, only without any humor and very little music". The jazz critic Scott Yanow, in his 2000 book Swing!, labeled the Daddies as the perfect "whipping boy for the Retro Swing movement", noting, "The Daddies sound as if they are a punk rock band who has chosen to masquerade as swing...the rhythm section has difficulty swinging, the vocals are often profane...the music, although excitable in spots, usually comes dangerously close to camp."

Perry's reflection on the album has been decidedly ambivalent, which he has described in interviews as being a "blessing as well as a curse", noting that while Zoot Suit Riot had exposed the Daddies' music to a wider audience and provided them with the financial stability to continue as a band, the success of the album continues to paint a one-dimensional image of the Daddies as an "orthodox swing band" over the prominently eclectic ska, punk and rock influences which largely feature in their music.

== 20th anniversary edition ==
In mid-2014, Perry revealed that he had re-obtained the rights to Zoot Suit Riot from Jive Records and planned to release a remixed version of the album. In interviews, Perry lamented the fact that the production of the album had been rushed and that only first takes had been used, noting that the band could have done "2 or 3 more" takes of the songs "if we had known the future back in 1996". He stated elsewhere, "I guess my thought is, after 25 years [of the band], I would like to make the record sound a little better."

Zoot Suit Riot: The 20th Anniversary Edition was released exclusively by the band on CD and vinyl on January 13, 2017, with five bonus live tracks recorded during the Zoot Suit Riot tour in 1998.

== Track listing ==
All songs written and composed by Perry, except where noted otherwise.

No.	Title	Length
1.	"Zoot Suit Riot"	3:53
2.	"The Ding-Dong Daddy of the D-Car Line"	3:31
3.	"When I Change Your Mind"	2:29
4.	"Here Comes the Snake"	3:18
5.	"Mr. White Keys"	3:07
6.	"Come Back to Me" (Burton Lane, Alan Jay Lerner)	2:39
7.	"Brown Derby Jump"	2:58
8.	"Dr. Bones"	3:34
9.	"Pink Elephant"	3:40
10.	"Master and Slave"	4:04
11.	"Drunk Daddy"	5:10
12.	"No Mercy for Swine"	4:02
13.	"Cherry Poppin' Daddy Strut"	3:05
14.	"Shake Your Lovemaker"	5:50
Total length:		51:28

Japanese release
No.	Title	Length
15.	"2:29"	3:43

20th Anniversary Edition
No.	Title	Length
15.	"No Mercy for Swine (Live '98)"
16.	"Here Comes the Snake (Live '98)"
17.	"Brown Derby Jump (Live '98)"
18.	"Zoot Suit Riot (Live '98)"
19.	"Whiskey Jack (Live '98)"
20.	"Zoot Suit Riot (Spanish version)"

- Later Mojo pressings of the album included a hidden Spanish-language version of "Zoot Suit Riot" after a long period of silence in the same track as "Shake Your Lovemaker".

=== Previous availability ===
Original album	Year	Track														
Original album	Year	1	2	3	4	5	6	7	8	9	10	11	12	13	14	15
Ferociously Stoned	1990								X		X	X		X	X	X
Rapid City Muscle Car	1994		X			X	X			X						
Kids on the Street	1996				X											
Previously unreleased	1997	X		X				X					X			

- "2:29" was previously a B-side that appeared on the 7-inch single Vacationing in Palm Springs, and later appeared on the UK and Australian "Zoot Suit Riot" singles.

== Personnel ==
- Steve Perry – vocals, guitar
- Dana Heitman – trumpet, trombone
- Ian Early – alto saxophone, tenor saxophone
- Sean Flannery – tenor saxophone
- Jason Moss – guitar
- Darren Cassidy – bass guitar
- Tim Donahue – drums

Additional musicians

- Glen Bonney – trombone on tracks 1, 15
- Bud Chase – tuba on track 3
- Mark Alan – backing vocals on track 15

The First Church of Sinatra

- Tim Allums – trumpet
- Mark Berney – trumpet
- Dave Van Handel – trombone
- Glen Bonney – trombone
- Wayne Conkey – bass trombone
- Ross Warren – alto saxophone
- Tim Wilcox – alto saxophone
- James Phillips – tenor saxophone
- Richard Coon (Temple) – baritone saxophone

== Charts ==
=== Weekly charts ===
Chart (1998)	Peak position
Australian Albums (ARIA Charts)	61
New Zealand Albums (RMNZ)	5
US Billboard 200	17
US Heatseekers Albums (Billboard)	1

=== Year-end charts ===
Chart (1998)	Position
US Billboard 200	57

== See also ==
- Skaboy JFK: The Skankin' Hits of the Cherry Poppin' Daddies, the Daddies' similar 2009 compilation of ska material
- Zoot suit riots, the historical event which inspired the title track
