= Saosin discography =

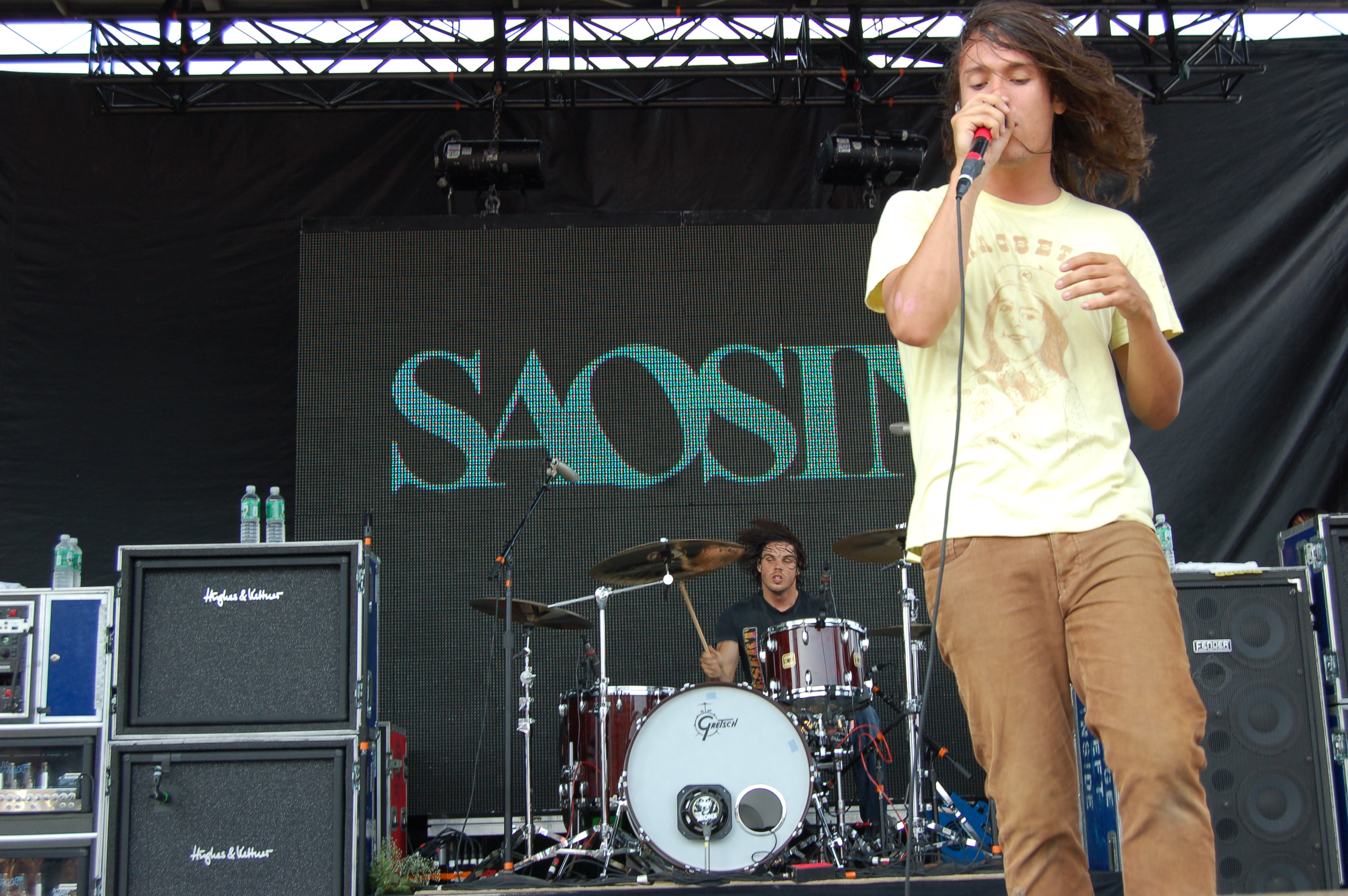
- Saosin performing on the Projekt Revolution Tour in 2007.
- Studio albums: 3
- Extended plays: 3
- Live albums: 2
- Singles: 22
- Music videos: 15
- Compilation tracks: 17

The discography of American rock band Saosin, consists of three studio albums, three extended plays (EPs), 22 singles and 15 music videos.

== Albums ==
=== Studio albums ===
Title	Album details	Peak chart positions						Certifications
Title	Album details	US	US Alt.	US Rock	US Digital Albums	AUS	JPN	Certifications
Saosin	Released: September 26, 2006; Label: Capitol	22	—	7	17	57	121	RIAA: Gold
In Search of Solid Ground	Released: September 8, 2009; Label: Virgin	19	4	6	11	69	56	
Along the Shadow	Released: May 20, 2016; Label: Epitaph	45	—	—	—	44	98	
"—" denotes a recording that did not chart or was not released in that territory.

=== Live albums ===
Title	Album details
Come Close	Released: March 11, 2008; Label: Capitol
Live from the Garden Amphitheater	Released: July 19, 2024; Label: Born Losers Records

== Extended plays ==
Title	EP details	Peak chart positions	
Title	EP details	US Ind.	US Heat.
Translating the Name	Released: June 17, 2003; Label: Death Do Us Part	36	27
Saosin	Released: August 4, 2005; Label: Capitol	—	—
The Grey	Released: October 14, 2008; Label: Capitol	—	—
"—" denotes a recording that did not chart or was not released in that territory.

== Singles ==
Title	Year	Peak chart positions	Certifications	Album
Title	Year	US Alt.	Certifications	Album
"Voices"	2006	25		Saosin
"You're Not Alone"	2007	—	RIAA: Gold	Saosin
"It's Far Better to Learn"	2007	—		Saosin
"Changing"	2009	30		In Search of Solid Ground
"—" denotes a recording that did not chart or was not released in that territory.

"—" denotes singles that did not chart.

=== Promotional singles ===
Year	Title	Album
2003	"Seven Years"	Translating the Name (EP)
2003	"3rd Measurement in C"	Translating the Name (EP)
2005	"Bury Your Head"(Original Version)	Saosin (EP)
2006	"Sleepers"	Saosin
2006	"Bury Your Head"	Saosin
2007	"Its Far Better to Learn"	Saosin
2009	"Is This Real"	In Search of Solid Ground
2009	"On My Own"	In Search of Solid Ground
2010	"Deep Down"	In Search of Solid Ground
2016	"The Silver String"	Along the Shadow
2016	"Racing Toward a Red Light"	Along the Shadow
2016	"Control and the Urge to Pray"	Along the Shadow
2020	"I Can Tell There Was an Accident Here Earlier"	non-album single
2020	"Mookie's Last Christmas"	non-album single
2020	"Mookie's Last Christmas (Monogram Sound Remix)"	non-album single
2020	"Mookie's Last Christmas (Acoustic 2020)"	non-album single
2020	"Mookie's Last Christmas (Jeremy Sh Griffith Remix)"	non-album single
2024	"Sleepers / Translating The Name (Live)"	Live at the Garden Amphitheater
2026	"Starting Over Again"	non-album single

== Music videos ==
Year	Title	Director	Ref.
2003	"Seven Years"	Danny Berk	
2003	"3rd Measurement in C"	Danny Berk	
2005	"Bury Your Head"	Danny Berk	
2006	"Voices" (Live Water Street Music Hall - Rochester, NY)	Christopher Sims	
2007	"Voices"	Christopher Sims	
2007	"You're Not Alone"	Popcore Films	
2007	"You're Not Alone" (Live)	Nick Lambrou	
2009	"Is This Real"	Christopher Sims	
2009	"On My Own"	Christopher Sims	
2009	"Changing"	Stephen Schuster	
2016	"The Silver String"	Andrew Swartz	
2016	"Racing Toward a Red Light"	Andrew Swartz	
2016	"Control and the Urge to Pray"	Andrew Swartz	
2024	"Sleepers (Live at The Garden Amphitheater)"		
2024	"Lost Symphonies (Live at The Garden Amphitheater)"		

== Compilation tracks ==
- A Santa Cause: It's a Punk Rock Christmas (2003) – "Mookie's Last Christmas"
- Music on the Brain Volume 1 (2004) – "I Can Tell There Was an Accident Here Earlier"
- The Mission Family Spring Sampler 05 (2005) – "Penelope" (Acoustic) (Pinback Cover)
- The Best of Taste of Chaos (2006) – "I Wanna Hear Another Fast Song" (Live) (UK Edition Only)
- Take Action! Volume 5 (2006) – "Sleepers" (Demo)
- AOL Sessions Under Cover (2007) - "Time After Time" (Acoustic) (Cyndi Lauper Cover)
- Chew It Out!: Stride Gum CD Sampler (2007) – "Sleepers" (Live Recording)
- NCIS: Soundtrack - VOL. 2 (2009) - "Move Slow"

=== Other use of Saosin tracks ===
- Atticus... Dragging the Lake Volume 3 (2005) – "Bury Your Head"
- 2007 KROQ New ROQ (2006) – "Voices"
- Reef: Bobby Martinez Mixed Tape (2007) – "It's Far Better To Learn"
- ATV Offroad Fury Pro (2007) - "Sleepers"
- The Best of Taste of Chaos Two (2007) – "Follow and Feel"
- Saw IV: Original Motion Picture Soundtrack (2007) – "Collapse"
- MX vs. ATV: Untamed (2007) - "Collapse"
- Burnout Dominator (2007) - "Collapse"
- Burnout Paradise (2008) - "Collapse"

== Demos ==
Saosin has released many instrumental and individual demos, but no official demo tapes. A more detailed list can be found here.

- Instrumental Demos (With Justin and Beau, not yet called Saosin) (2003)
- "I Can Tell There Was An Accident Here Earlier" (Demo with Anthony Green) (2003)
- Instrumental Demos (2004)
- "Mookie's Last Christmas" (Acoustic Audition) with Cove Reber on Vocals (2004)
- "I Can Tell... (There Was An Accident Here)" (Demo re-recorded with Cove Reber) (2004)
- Capitol Demos (Including "Uphill Battle") (2005)
- "Come Close" Instrumental Demo (2005)
- Demos known as "The Norma Jean Song", "Back to Greatness" and "Untitled" (2010)
- 3rd Studio Album Demos sessions with Tilian Pearson on vocals (known as "Change" and "Promises") (2011)
- Instrumental demos known as "Brikka Brikka" and "Exfoliator" ["The Norma Jean Song" re-recorded demo] released in "In Search of Solid Ground (iTunes version)" (2012)
- "Exfoliator" (Re-recorded with Tilian Pearson on 3rd Studio Album Demos sessions [possibly recorded in 2011]) (2012)
