= Beau Burchell =

American guitarist and record producer (born 1978)

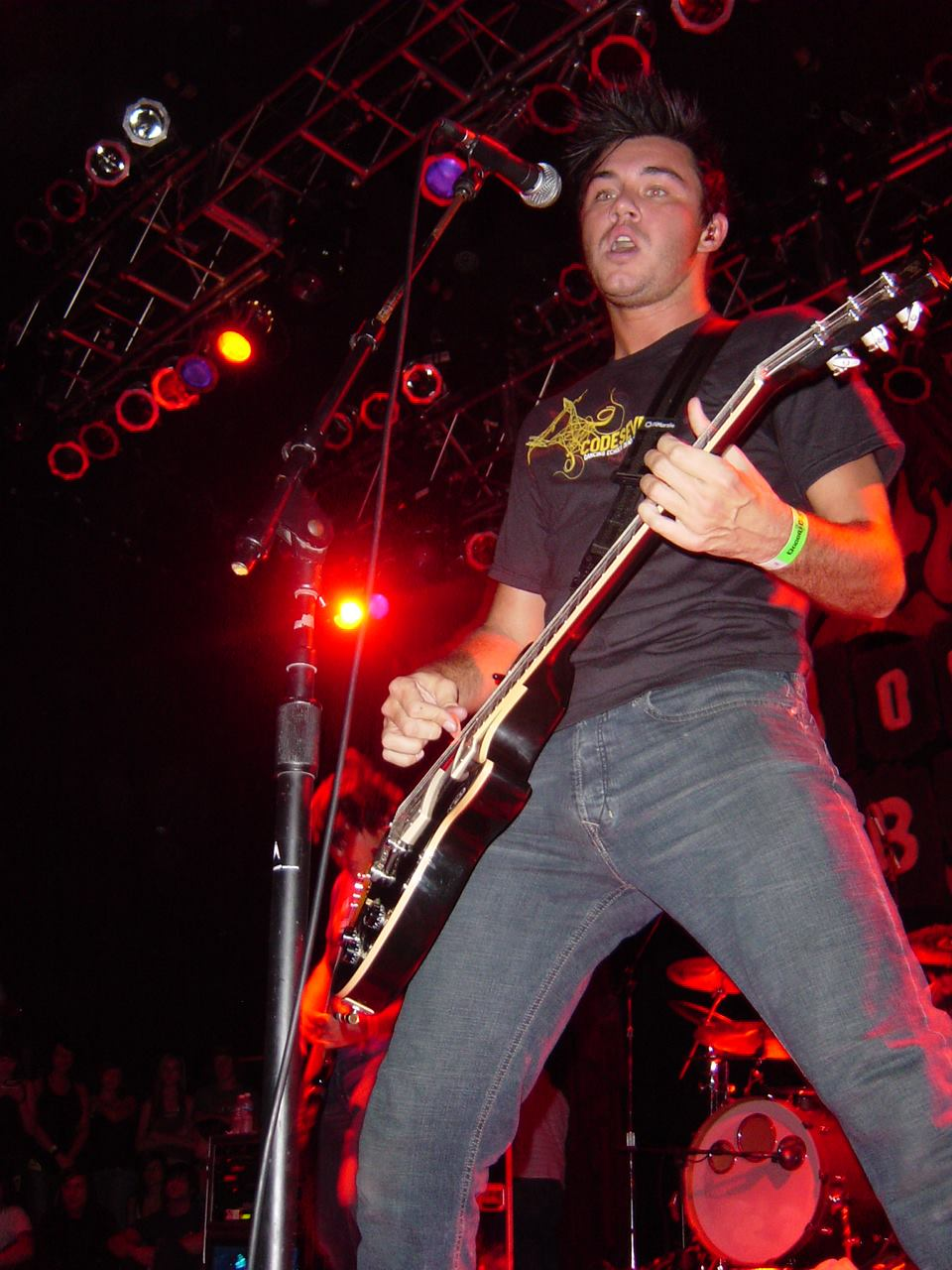
- Burchell on stage with Saosin at The House of Blues Anaheim, 2005

Background information
- Born: December 17, 1978 (age 47)
- Origin: Orange County, California, U.S.
- Genres: Post-hardcore; indie rock; alternative rock; emo; hardcore punk
- Occupations: Musician; record producer; audio engineer
- Instruments: Guitar; vocals
- Years active: 1997–present
- Member of: Saosin
- Formerly of: Kosmos Express; Open Hand
- Website: saosin.com

Beau Burchell (born December 17, 1978) is an American guitarist, record producer, and audio engineer from Orange County, California. As a performer, he is best known as the guitarist and backing vocalist in Saosin. He is one of Saosin's founders, and the band's only remaining member who has played with the band through its entire existence. He has previously been a member of Kosmos Express and Open Hand.

Burchell also has a prolific reputation as a record producer. He has been credited on over thirty albums of various types of punk rock. He also owns the record label Death Do Us Part.

== Career ==
In addition to his work as a guitarist and producer, Burchell has participated in music-production education. In 2016, he appeared on the Nail the Mix platform as a guest instructor, providing a full mix breakdown of Saosin’s song “The Silver String.”

Burchell has also collaborated with audio-software companies on signature production tools. He partnered with Room Sound to release the Beau Burchell Signature Series drum sample library, designed to replicate his recording and mixing style. He also worked with STL Tones to create the Beau Burchell Kemper Pack, a collection of guitar amp profiles based on his studio tones.

== Gear ==
On stage, Burchell has been seen playing a Gibson Les Paul Custom, a Gibson SG Standard, a Burny Les Paul Custom, a Fender Jaguar, and a Balaguer Guitars Thicket BB. He plays a Hughes & Kettner Triamp MKII amp through both a Hughes & Kettner 4x12 cabinet with Vintage 30 speakers and a 2x12 cabinet with Greenback speakers. He has also stated that onstage he uses a Bob Bradshaw Custom Audio Electronics Looper, a RS-10 MIDI Switching Module, a Line 6 Echo Pro Delay Unit, TC Electronic G-Major, Shure U4D wireless Unit, a Boss noise gate, and a Dunlop Tremolo Pedal.

To record Translating the Name, Burchell played both a Gibson Les Paul Standard and Gibson SG Standard. He used a modded Mesa/Boogie 2-Channel Dual Rectifier amp through a Marshall 1960B cabinet for the rhythm tracks.

== Discography ==
=== Kosmos Express ===
- Now (1997)
- Simulcast (1998)

=== As Hope Dies ===
- Birth Place and Burial Site (2002)
- Legions Bow To A Faceless God (2003)

=== Saosin ===
- Translating the Name (2003)
- Saosin (2006)
- Come Close (2008)
- The Grey EP (2008)
- In Search of Solid Ground (2009)
- Along the Shadow (2016)

=== Production credits ===
Band	Album	Role	Release year
Kosmos Express	Simulcast	Arranger	1998
As Hope Dies	Birth Place and Burial Ground	Engineer, mixing	2002
ForeverIRise	Go Where They Sleep And See If They’re Safe	Producer, Engineer, mixing	2002
As Hope Dies	Legions Bow To A Faceless God	Producer, engineer, mixing	2003
Name Taken/Bayside	Split	Producer, engineer, mixing	2003
The Bronx	The Bronx	Engineer, mixing	2003
Various Artists	Different Shade of Green: Tribute to Green Day	Producer, mixing	2003
Various Artists	Bad Scene, Everyone's Fault: Jawbreaker Tribute	Producer, engineer, mixing	2003
Various Artists	A Santa Cause: It's a Punk Rock Christmas	Producer	2003
Death on Wednesday	Songs to To	Engineer	2003
The Higher	Star is Dead	Producer, engineer, mixing	2003
The Bled	Pass the Flask	Producer, engineer, mixing	2003
Scars of Tomorrow	Design Your Fate	Engineer	2003
Salem	Love It or Leave Me EP	Producer, engineer	2003
Saosin	Translating the Name	Producer, engineer, mixing	2003
Taken	Between Two Unseens CD/DVD	Producer, engineer	2004
Name Taken	Hold On	Producer, engineer, mixing	2004
Saosin	Saosin EP	Mixing	2005
Reel Big Fish	We're Not Happy 'til You're Not Happy	Engineer	2005
Scars of Tomorrow	Beginning Of	Engineer	2005
Various Artists	Punk Goes 90's	Producer, mixing	2005
Saosin	Come Close	Engineer, Mixing	2008
Underoath	Survive, Kaleidoscope	Mixing	2008
Saosin	In Search of Solid Ground	Engineer, mixing	2008
Taken	This Is Forever	Mixing	2008
Drop Dead, Gorgeous	The Hot N' Heavy	Mixing	2009
It Prevails	Capture and Embrace	Mixing, mastering	2009
History Of...	Alcheringa; The Dreaming	Mixing, mastering	2010
Guiltmaker	The Emerald Coast	Mastering	2010
Trash Talk	Eyes & Nines	Mastering	2010
It Prevails	Stroma	Mixing, mastering	2011
Hideouts	Obsessed	Producer, engineer	2014
Emery	You Were Never Alone	Mixing	2015
Hands Like Houses	Dissonants	Writer (track 11)	2016
Saosin	Along the Shadow	Engineer, mixing	2016
Moose Blood	Blush	Producer, engineer, mixing	2016
Senses Fail	In Your Absence (EP)	Mixing (tracks 1–3)	2017
Hundred Suns	The Prestaliis	Producer, mixing	2017
Senses Fail	If There Is Light, It Will Find You	Producer	2018
Moose Blood	I Don't Think I Can Do This Anymore	Producer, recording, mixing	2018
Limbs	Father's Son	Producer, engineer, mixing	2018
Erra	Neon	Producer, engineer	2018
Hail the Sun	Mental Knife	Producer, engineer, mixing	2018
Emery	Eve	Mixing	2018
It Prevails	A Life Worth Living (EP)	Mixing	2019
Senses Fail	From the Depths of Dreams (EP) (Re-imagined)	Recording	2019
Emery	White Line Fever	Mixing	2020
Lightworker	Fury By Failure	Producer, Mixing	2020
Erabella	The Familiar Grey	Producer, Mixing, Mastering	2020
Boston Manor	Desperate Times Desperate Pleasures (EP)	Mixing	2021
Senses Fail	Hell Is in Your Head	Producer, engineer (all tracks), mixing (track 2)	2022
The Bled	Silent Treatment	Remixing, remastering	2022
Boston Manor	Datura	Mixing	2022
He Is Legend	Endless Hallway	Mixing	2022
Project 86	OMNI, Pt. 1	Producer, engineer, mixing	2023
Lightworker	How the Beautiful Decay	Producer, engineer, mixing	2024
Chevelle	Bright as Blasphemy	Mixing	2025
