= Kosmos Express =

Rock band

Kosmos Express was a rock band from the 1990s. They were represented in both the mainstream and Christian market.

== Biography ==
From early 1997 to mid-1998, Kosmos Express released two critically acclaimed records, Now featuring the hit song “Beautiful” co-produced by Craig Nepp (Save Ferris, Jimmy Eat World, The Vandals, The Ventures, Sense Field) and Simulcast, featuring the smash-hit song “The Force” produced by Gene Eugene (Aunt Bettys, Starflyer 59) both on Zomba Music Group labels.

Kosmos Express was named after the Paul Weller song "Kosmos" from Weller's self-titled debut solo album. The legendary leader of The Jam was also mentioned in the Kosmos Express song "In My Face" on Simulcast, as well as thanked on the album.

Kosmos Express toured an intense live show; enjoyed airplay of its singles and videos around the world; appeared on television and movie soundtracks and various compilations; received favorable press internationally, including book inclusions; but decided to call it quits in 2000, though the group continues to receive airplay and attention to this day, especially overseas.

Frontman Rob Goraieb went on to lead the rock/pop group, The Get Set, and now writes for TV/film, most recently for shows on NBC Universal and MTV. Guitarist Beau Burchell joined L.A. band Open Hand and co-formed the post-hardcore band Saosin. Burchell is now a music producer, mixer, and engineer. Mark Powell went on to play drums for a variety of groups including Liar's Inc (Sony Music) replacing drummer Atom Willard (Rocket from the Crypt, Alkaline Trio) and contributed to studio projects for Queen Kwong with Dave Navarro (Jane's Addiction) and Chris Chaney (Alanis Morissette, Eddie Vedder).

Goraieb also released a solo record, Apartment 305 (B/R/M Records and Not Lame Recordings). Guests on the record included bassist Dan Schwartz (Sheryl Crow, Susanna Hoffs, Jon Hassell, Brian Eno), and drummer Mark Powell, who played in both Kosmos Express and The Get Set.

Goraieb got his start with Gleaming Spires, the band for the legendary eccentric duo, Sparks, performing on Gleaming Spires' record, Funk For Children (released on the Posh Boy Records/Vodka Label). Gleaming Spires is best known for their hit song, "Are You Ready for the Sex Girls?"

== Band members ==
- Rob Goraieb: Lead Vocals, Guitar, Songwriter
- Beau Burchell: Guitar
- G.J. Torres: Bass, Backing Vocals
- Mark Powell: Drums, Piano, Percussion

== Additional musicians ==
- Ron Alayra: Drums, Percussion
- The Greek: Bass, BGV's
- Debbi Devore: Vocals
- Melissa Hasin: Cello
- Chris Diede: Trombone
- Biff Vincent: Piano
- Gene Eugene: Rhodes, Mellotron
- David Stenske: Viola
- John Edward Acosta: Cello
- Terry Scott Taylor: Vocal Production
- Rob Watson: String Arrangements

== Discography ==
- Now (1997, Reviews: The Phantom Tollbooth, crossrhythms.co.uk)
- Simulcast (1998, Reviews: The Phantom Tollbooth, crossrhythms.co.uk, Kevin Baker, Cool Fools)

Compilations:

- The Buzz (1997)
- Statements From The Green Planet (featuring the unreleased song, "I Don't Have A Gun" 1997)
- Apple "Modern Rock For Those With Taste" (1997)
- Express Your Worship (Survivor Records U.K. 1997)
- 7-Ball Gas Collection 1 (1997)
- The Future CCM (1997)
- Nothing But........Rock (Label: CMC/Canada 1997)
- Various Sampler, Rock - Release 40 (1997)
- Heavenly Hits (Zomba Records 1997)
- Cornerstone '98 Sampler (Madacy Records 1998)
- Razor Cuts (1998)
- Transmitter Sampler CD Vol. 1 (1999)
- Propska One (1999)
- Power: Songs For The Soul (2002)
- Radio Christian Hits/Best Of (Madacy Records 2006)
- Christian Radio Hits Faith and Power (Madacy/EMI 2-CD Set 2009)

== Radio Singles ==
- Beautiful
- Little Tree
- Just Say It
- Miss America
- The Force
- Gone
- Emotional

== Videos ==
- Beautiful (1997)
- The Force (1998)
- Gone (1998)

Compilations:

- Jars, Plumb, and Then Some (featuring "Beautiful" 1997)

== T.V./Movies ==
Kosmos Express songs have appeared in:

- The Moment of Truth 2: Take A Stand (Truth Soul Armor 1997)
- ESPN Extreme (ESPN 1998)
- The Climb (World Wide Pictures 2002)
- Today Show (NBC 2007)

== Trivia ==
- Rob was signed as a songwriter to the band's label prior to Kosmos being formed. The first record was written before there was a band or even the name Kosmos Express. (Source: Fuel Magazine)
- Acclaimed Los Angeles group Neve (Portrait/Sony/Columbia) paid to borrow the concept of the Kosmos Express “Gone” video (Director: Michael Peleaux) for the video of their hit song "It's Over Now" (Director: Jeff Gordon). Both group's videos worked well.
- Crooner/lounge singer, John Jonethis, covered two Kosmos Express songs. He recorded "Love Is Me" and "Little Tree." "Love Is Me" was also included as a bonus track on the Now CD. He did such a good job with them that writer Rob Goraieb said he prefers listening to Jonethis' versions over the Kosmos Express ones.
