= Hell Is in Your Head =

Studio album by Senses Fail
- Released: July 15, 2022
- Recorded: February–September 2020
- Length: 41:43
- Label: Pure Noise
- Producer: Beau Burchell

Senses Fail studio album chronology
If There Is Light, It Will Find You (2018)	Hell Is in Your Head (2022)

Singles from Hell Is in Your Head
- 1. "Lush Rimbaugh" Released: February 17, 2021; 2. "Death by Water" Released: August 19, 2021; 3. "I'm Sorry I'm Leaving" Released: November 4, 2021; 4. "End of the World/ A Game of Chess" Released: June 14, 2022; 5. "Hell Is in Your Head" Released: July 15, 2022

Hell Is in Your Head is the eighth studio album by American rock band Senses Fail. It was released on July 15, 2022, through Pure Noise Records.

== Background and production ==
Senses Fail released their seventh studio album If There Is Light, It Will Find You in February 2018. It marked a return to the emo sound of their debut studio album Let It Enfold You (2004). It was promoted with two headlining tours of the United States, a stint on the Warped Tour, and a co-headlining US tour with the Amity Affliction.

Co-produced by Saosin's Beau Burchell, Hell Is In Your Head marks the band's first studio album since 2018's If There Is Light, It Will Find You.

== Themes ==
The general theme of the album discusses lead singer Buddy Nielsen's ideas of how to process grief. Nielsen's wife suffered complications during the birth of the couple's first child, and was nearly seriously injured. He explained "My wife had a pretty serious childbirth" and added "I do not want to say she almost died but it was pretty scary for a minute. And the relationship you have to have with your child is just a constant letting go of yourself in ways that you did not necessarily perceive you needed to. I had to start to come to terms with my own death because my daughter, who's now four, keeps asking about it. So this felt like an opportunity to maybe address grief and how we process being - how do you have a kid, how do you be alive, how do you continue to live a meaningful life while also knowing that you're going to die?" When the general background of the album focuses heavily on death, existentialism, the fragility of human life, grief, and parenthood.

"Lush Rimbaugh", the first single off the album, was released on the same day Rush Limbaugh, the subject of the songs lyrics, died. According to Nielsen, the song is not meant to be a celebration of death but rather a truthful eulogy for somebody who had dedicated their whole life to causing offense to others.

== Critical reception ==
Professional ratings
Review scores
Source	Rating
Blabbermouth.net	7.5/10
Kerrang!	4/5
Rock Magazine	9.5/10 stars

Kerrang! gave a score of 4 out of 5 and they say "This album is purposefully careless, its words are the most potent part of what makes it magical, both outrageous and down to earth. It's an honest fresh wound, like the raw skin of a grazed knee as Buddy stands to his feet, brushing it off and embracing the fall ". They say the style is similar to those bands Taking Back Sunday, The Used, The Red Jumpsuit Apparatus.

Blabbermouth.net gave a score of 75 out of 100 and they say "Lyrically, the band has always put forward a unique brand of blunt honesty speckled with moments of poetry. On this album, Nielsen's lyrics are so frank that they sometimes sound strange in song form, such as, "I've been reading my horoscope" ("Death By Water") and "The polar bears are dying" ("Miles To Go"). In many ways, these songs come across more like diary entries. And perhaps, that is the best way to experience this record: as a way of getting to know the artist better. Maybe that's not enough to make this an excellent record, but it's enough to make it an interesting one".

Sean Reid stated in his review for Punktastic, "While stylistically reliable, and often punchy, 'HIIYH' doesn't fully stand out from previous Senses Fail records. Where the mid-2010 outings 'Pull The Thorns From Your Heart' and 'Renacer' embraced a heavy, chaotic hardcore sound, 'HIIYH' continues the band's melodic return that began with 2018's 'If There Is Light, It Will Find You'. Although it's favourable and executed well, there is a tendency where hooks blur the line between sounding familiar and recycled. 'Miles To Go' is a fitting example of this, proving to be one of the album's most forgettable moments."

== Track listing ==
All tracks are written by James Nielsen.

Hell Is in Your Head track listing
No.	Title	Length
1.	"Burial of the Dead"	3:19
2.	"End of the World/A Game of Chess" (featuring SeeYouSpaceCowboy)	3:57
3.	"The Fire Sermon"	3:26
4.	"I Am Error"	3:52
5.	"Death by Water" (featuring Spencer Charnas)	3:50
6.	"What the Thunder Said"	4:27
7.	"Miles to Go"	3:11
8.	"Lush Rimbaugh"	3:13
9.	"Hell Is in Your Head"	3:03
10.	"I'm Sorry I'm Leaving"	3:12
11.	"Grow Away from Me"	6:13
Total length:		41:43

== Personnel ==
Senses Fail

- Buddy Nielsen – vocals, guitar, programming
- Gavin Caswell – guitar, bass guitar
- Dan Trapp – drums

Additional contributors

- Beau Burchell – production, engineering (all tracks), mixing (2, 5)
- Ken Andrews – mixing (1, 3–11)
- Mike Kalajian – mastering
- Nick Steinhardt – art direction, design
- Ryan Sanders – art direction, design

== Charts ==
Chart performance for Hell Is in Your Head
Chart (2022)	Peak position
UK Independent Albums (Official Charts)	43
