= Cove Reber =

American singer-songwriter (born 1985)

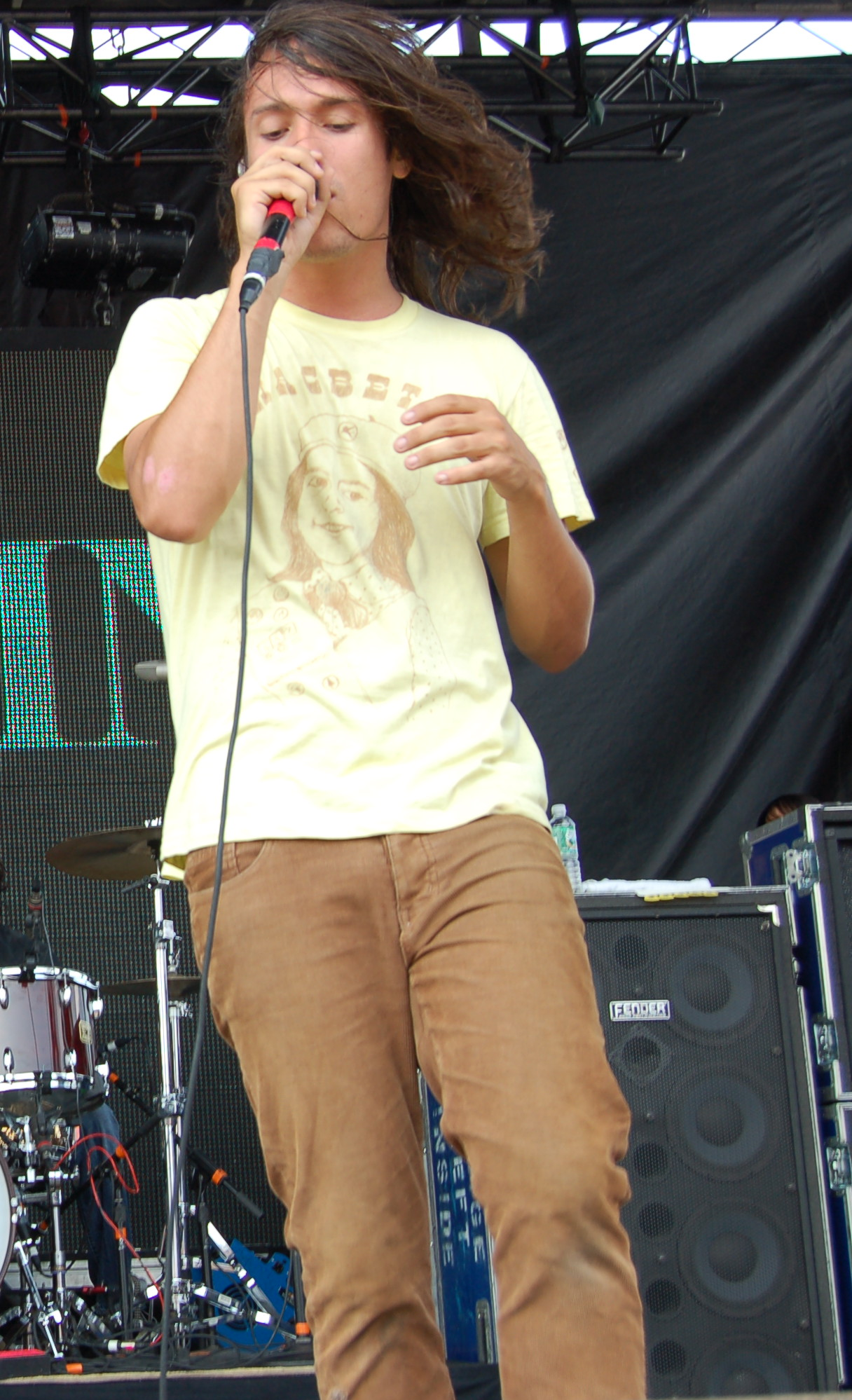
- Reber with Saosin in 2007

Background information
- Born: August 28, 1985 (age 41)
- Origin: Vista, California, U.S.
- Genres: Post-hardcore; emo; alternative rock
- Occupations: Singer; songwriter; musician
- Instruments: Vocals; piano; guitar; bass
- Years active: 2004–2010, 2016–present
- Member of: Saosin; Dead American
- Formerly of: Patriot; Lé Tired

Cove Reber (born August 28, 1985) is an American singer-songwriter known for his contributions to the post-hardcore music scene. He is best known for his tenure as the lead vocalist of Saosin from 2004 to 2010. In 2024, Reber, alongside Anthony Green, joined Saosin for their 20th anniversary tour and live album. Since 2021, he has toured with Saosin, sharing vocal duties with Anthony Green. Reber has also fronted the bands Dead American and Lé Tired. Reber re-joined Saosin officially since 2024.

== Early life ==
Cove Reber was born in Provo, Utah, and grew up a member of the Church of Jesus Christ of Latter-day Saints.

During an interview with Shane Told of Silverstein on the Lead Singer Syndrome podcast, Reber cites that he was influenced by the newly "popping off" San Diego pop-punk band Blink-182 specifically taking after the band's vocalist and bassist Mark Hoppus.

Reber started out in early life as vocalist for Vista, California, high school bands Mormon In The Middle and Stamp Out Detroit in the early 2000s before auditioning and joining Saosin as lead vocalist in 2004.

== Musical career ==
=== Saosin (2004–2010; 2024–present) ===
In early 2004 Reber auditioned for and integrated in to the post-hardcore band, Saosin, where he replaced vocalist, Anthony Green. With Saosin, Reber recorded The Grey EP, Saosin EP and notably Saosin (2006) and In Search of Solid Ground (2009) with the inclusion of the live album and DVD Come Close at The Theatre of Living Arts in Philadelphia, Pennsylvania on November 3, 2007.

Reber was asked to leave Saosin in early 2010. Later reports from the band cited that Reber was asked to leave Saosin due to the deterioration of his stage and vocal performance and he could no longer perform. Reber later addressed his departure by saying the following:

"In 2003, I fell in love with a band that not only changed the way that I viewed music, but also inspired me to pursue my dreams. In 2004, the members of that very band that I was madly in love with took a giant risk and gave me, the worlds biggest Saosin fan, a shot. I got to play and make music with my heroes. Even now, Justin, Alex, Beau and Chris are living legends in my mind. It’s not very often that you hear someone say that they had the amazing privilege of working with people they so highly admire and respect.

But all bands have their problems and we were no exception. It all started with one comment directed towards me. That seemingly small comment completely drained every ounce of confidence I had worked so hard to build up. Not only did it completely catch me off guard, but not one of my heroes stood up for me, let alone acknowledged that the comment made was truly uncalled for. Thinking you’ve let your heroes down in even the smallest way really freaking sucks.

I’m sorry if any of you feel ripped off from my live performances- I take that to heart because every night that I get up on stage, I’m doing it for you guys- for the fans who come to our shows and show us support. As far as smoking goes, it’s not something I intentionally hid but it’s definitely not a habit I wanted to broadcast or promote. Let me make this crystal clear, it’s not a cool thing to do. Anyone who says it is “cool” is flat out lying to you. We all have our demons and this is one I struggle with.

For a while now, I had been feeling like it was only a matter of time until my end with Saosin was going to come. I’m just glad I got to sing, write, and record songs with my heroes. For those of you who feel like my role in Saosin was a dominant one, for better or for worse, it wasn’t; every decision we made, we made together. Whether you feel like my departure is positive or negative, I really do wish Justin, Beau, Chris and Alex the best of luck and I will always support them in all that they do.

Now that that’s off my chest, life has been treating me awesome these days. The passion and love for music I felt I had lost is back, my confidence is growing daily, and I really can’t wait to show you all what I’ve been working on. Thank you all for giving me the wonderful opportunity to live out my dream over the last 6 years. It was one hell of a ride, but I truly believe that the best is yet to come.".

— thealterpress.com, "Cove Reber Addresses Departure", http://www.alterthepress.com/2010/08/cove-reber-addresses-saosin-departure.html (2010)

Following Reber's departure, the band entered a hiatus period, during which the original lead vocalist, Anthony Green, returned to replace Reber in 2014.

In 2024, Reber officially rejoined Saosin with plans to re-record and re-release their self-titled debut album. Prior to this, Reber had been serving as a guest vocalist alongside Green since 2021 touring their live shows.

=== Patriot (2011–2016) ===
After leaving Saosin in 2010, Reber started a project titled Patriot with Joey Bradford (a guitarist of A Static Lullaby and the Used) and Kyle Rosa. In 2011 demo versions of songs Float Away With Me and I Found My Way were released on the groups BandCamp page. In 2016, Patriot released an official 4-track Dream Weaver EP.

=== Dead American (2016–present) ===
Then residing in Salt Lake City in 2016, Reber had met Sleep For Sleepers guitarist Chad Jordan through a friend. Inspired by instrumental demos that Jordan had recorded, Reber recorded vocals over them. The recorded demos later surfaced in 2017 and into early 2018 on Reber's Instagram feed which included promotional shots and compilations of recording progress teasers under the name Dead American.

Throughout 2018, Dead American officially released short teasers featuring Reber on their Instagram feed promoting songs from their EP, The Shape of Punk Is Dumb. On September 1, 2018, Ants and Pawns was the first of five successive singles to be released from their EP. The Shape of Punk is Dumb was released independently on October 5, 2018. On August 23, 2019, the sixth single Wandering was released shortly after the EP's release as a bonus track.

Since 2019, the band went on to sign a record deal with Equal Vision Records and Velocity Records and release two singles Choke and Full of Smoke from their debut album New Nostalgia.

=== Scary Kids Scaring Kids ===
Scary Kids Scaring Kids enlisted Reber to feature as vocalist for The City Sleeps in Flames 15 year anniversary tour in 2020 and 2021 respectively. Reber ended up touring with the band until 2022.

=== Lé Tired ===
In 2024, Reber, Joey Bradford and Kyle Rosa (all previously from Patriot) founded a project titled lé tired. The band promised to release one song a month, documenting the recording process on their YouTube channel.

== Guest appearances ==
- Destroy the Runner - "From The Red" (feat. Cove Reber) from Saints (2006)
- Norma Jean - "Surrender Your Sons", "Robots 3 Humans 0", "Murphy Was an Optimist" and "And There Will Be a Swarm of Hornets" from The Anti Mother (2008)
- HOllOWS - "You're Not the Only One" (feat. Cove Reber) from HOllOWS EP (2016).
- The Undertaking! - "And Everything Worked out Just Fine" (feat. Cove Reber) from Funeral Psalms (2021)
- 09 - "Lost Years" (feat. Cove Reber) from Lost Years (2021)
- Scary Kids Scaring Kids - "New Morning" from Out of Light (2022)
- Wake Me - "Together Alone" (feat. Cove Reber) (Single, 2022)
- Dvrk x Helzak - "Pipe Dream" (feat. Cove Reber) (Single, 2022)
- P.O.D. - "This Is My Life" from Veritas (2024)

== Bands ==
Band	Position	Years active
Saosin	Lead vocalist	2004–2010, 2024–present
Patriot	Vocalist	2011–2016
Dead American	Lead vocalist	2016–present
Lé Tired	Lead vocalist	2024–present

== Discography ==
=== Saosin ===
EPs

- The Grey EP (2008), Capitol
- Saosin (EP) (2005), Capitol

Albums

- Saosin (2006), Capitol
- Come Close (2008), Capitol
- In Search of Solid Ground (2009), Virgin

Singles

- Mookie's Last Christmas (Acoustic Audition, 2004), Independent
- Capitol Demos (Demo, 2005), Independent
- Come Close (Demo, 2005), Independent
- 2010 Demos (Demo, 2010), Independent

=== Patriot ===
EPs

- Dream Weaver (EP) (2016), Independent

Singles

- I Found My Way (Demo song, 2011)

=== Dead American ===
EPs

- The Shape of Punk is Dumb (2018), Independent

Albums

- New Nostalgia (2022), Equal Vision Records, Velocity Records

Singles

- False Intentions (2019), Independent
- Wandering (2019), Independent
- Choke (2021), Equal Vision Records, Velocity Records
- Full of Smoke (2022), Equal Vision Records, Velocity Records
- ADD (2023), Velocity Records
- Into Oblivion (2024), Velocity Records

=== Le Tired ===
Singles

- My Seasonal Ghost (2024)
- Arctic Dispute (2024)
