= Balagueró =

Balagueró is a Catalan surname. Notable people with the surname include:

- Gerard Moreno Balaguero (born 1992), Spanish footballer
- Jaume Balagueró (born 1968), Spanish film director

== See also ==
- Balaguer (disambiguation)#People
