= Hold On (Name Taken album) =

Studio album by Name Taken
- Released: April 13, 2004
- Recorded: January 2004 at Saosound/Newps, Newport, California
- Genre: Alternative rock, emo
- Length: 34:16
- Label: Fiddler, FDLR019
- Producer: Beau Burchell

Name Taken chronology
| Bayside/Name Taken Split (2003) | Hold On (2004) |

Hold On is the debut studio album by American rock band Name Taken. The album was produced by Saosin guitarist Beau Burchell. The second track, "Hold on for Your Dearest Life", was subsequently collected on the Warped Tour 2005 Tour Compilation.

The lyrics of the fourth track "Panic", is the first appearance of the term Panic! at the Disco, later used as the namesake of the platinum-selling band.

Panic! at the disco
Sat back and took it so slow
Are you nervous? Are you shaking?

== Reception ==
Professional ratings
Review scores
| Source | Rating |
|---|---|
| Allmusic | 2/5 stars |
| AbsolutePunk | 91% |
| Punknews.org | 3.5/5 stars |

Hold On received mixed to favorable reviews from critics. AbsolutePunk founder Jason Tate gave the album a 91% rating, noting "The music beat pulses into your chest, your head expands and contracts with each riff and you can't help but let your head rock to the music." Punknews.org also praised the album in their review, noting "If there is a competition to see which of the two bands featured on last year's Bayside/Name Taken Split would produce a better follow-up full length album, consider Name Taken the winner." Allmusic gave the album a less favorable review, stating "For the album's duration, its Name Taken's adherence to formula and the glossy production of Beau Burchell -- not memorable hooks or unique dynamics -- that keep things together."

== Track listing ==
All tracks are written by Name Taken.

| No. | Title | Length |
|---|---|---|
| 1. | "Control" | 2:48 |
| 2. | "Hold on for Your Dearest Life" | 3:10 |
| 3. | "A Year Spent Cold" | 3:45 |
| 4. | "Panic" | 2:58 |
| 5. | "This Was Never" | 3:20 |
| 6. | "Cover Up" | 3:25 |
| 7. | "It Sounds Prettier in Spanish" | 2:14 |
| 8. | "We Give Up Sometimes" | 3:00 |
| 9. | "I Quit My Scene" | 3:17 |
| 10. | "Drive Drive Drive" | 2:32 |
| 11. | "Clear and Conscious" | 3:47 |
| Total length: | | 34:16 |

== Personnel ==
Name Taken

- Chad Atkinson – Lead vocals, bass guitar
- Blake Means – Guitar
- Ryan Edwards – Guitar
- Danny Valencia – Drums, percussion

Artwork

- Creative Direction - Amy Fleisher Madden
- Sergie Loobkoff – Design
- RJ Shaughnessy – Photography

Production

- Beau Burchell – Producer, engineer, mixing
- Shawn Sullivan – Mastering
- Rory Phillips – Pre-Production, Vocal Producer

Managerial

- One Moment Management – Lance Brown
