= If There Is Light, It Will Find You =

Studio album by Senses Fail
- Released: February 16, 2018
- Recorded: June–August 2017
- Studios: The Cottage and Seahorse Studios, Los Angeles, California
- Genres: Screamo; post-hardcore; pop-punk; punk rock
- Length: 44:52
- Label: Pure Noise
- Producer: Beau Burchell

Senses Fail chronology
In Your Absence (2017)	If There Is Light, It Will Find You (2018)	Hell Is in Your Head (2022)

Senses Fail studio album chronology
Pull the Thorns from Your Heart (2015)	If There Is Light, It Will Find You (2018)	Hell Is in Your Head (2022)

Singles from If There Is Light, It Will Find You
- 1. "Double Cross" Released: November 30, 2017; 2. "Gold Jacket, Green Jacket..." Released: January 11, 2018; 3. "New Jersey Makes, the World Takes" Released: February 1, 2018

If There Is Light, It Will Find You is the seventh studio album by American rock band Senses Fail. It charted at number 57 on the Billboard 200.

== Background and production ==
Bassist Gavin Caswell moved to rhythm guitar, resulting in the inclusion of bassist Jason Millbank. In October and November 2016, the group supported Sum 41 on their headlining US tour. Following the tour's conclusion, the group took some time off to write material for their next record. In March and April 2017, the band went on the Quince Años Tour, an outing to celebrate being a band for 15 years. Coinciding with this, the band released the stop-gap In Your Absence acoustic EP, which was produced by Saosin guitarist Beau Burchell. By this point, the group had six new songs finished; Nielsen said the new material leaned towards the more melodic sound of the group's early days.

On June 19, they announced they had begun recording their next album If There Is Light, It Will Find You. Sessions were produced and engineered by Burchell at his studio The Cottage in Los Angeles, California. By July 4, they had three songs done. On August 2, it was revealed that former drummer Dan Trapp would be performing drums on the album, which were tracked at Seahorse Studios in Los Angeles with assistant engineer Blake Bunzel. Burchell mixed the recordings, before they were mastered by Mike Kalajian at Rogue Planet Mastering.

== Composition ==
=== Overview ===
If There Is Light serves as the first Senses Fail album written solely by vocalist Buddy Nielsen. He had not done the majority of the songwriting until three years prior, when he began developing his writing skills. After deciding on the direction, he brought in other people to help musically enhance the songs. For example, he brought in Caswell for guitar solos, as Nielsen considered himself a limited guitarist. Despite all of the songs being credited to the band as a whole in the album booklet, BMI gives individual credits to each of the songs: all of the tracks, bar "Gold Jacket, Green Jacket...", "Is It Gonna Be the Year?" and "Orlando and a Miscarriage" were credited to Nielsen and Burchell. The remaining three were credited to Nielsen, Burchell, and Caswell.

All of the lyrics were written by Nielsen, except for a line in "Elevator to the Gallows" by Wesley Eisold of American Nightmare. He drew inspiration from several events: the birth of his daughter, his wife's near-fatal struggle with multiple sclerosis, the Pulse nightclub shooting, and substance abuse. Musically, the album's sound has been classified as screamo, post-hardcore, pop-punk, and punk rock. It returns to the rock-centric sound of Let It Enfold You after having spent the preceding two albums – Renacer (2013) and Pull the Thorns from Your Heart (2015) – playing in hardcore punk/metal territory.

=== Songs ===
"Double Cross" is a song reflective of the changing lineups of the band, with Nielsen stating it is not "meant to be angry at the people who left, but there is a little bit of that resentment for people moving on from music being their passion." "New Jersey Makes, the World Takes" is about Nielsen's friends battling drug addictions, with Nielsen stating, "Over the years, I have lost a number of friends to drug addiction. This song addresses those losses and how I have tried to intervene in people’s addictions over the years [...] So many of us in this country have a friend or loved one who has lost their battle, and I thought it was important to highlight that struggle." The song's title references an expression lettered on the side of the Lower Trenton Bridge. "Gold Jacket, Green Jacket..." is a social critique song that was written with the goal of writing a song that would "sum up this generation for this time", similar to Nirvana's "Smells Like Teen Spirit". The title is a truncated quote from Happy Gilmore, where Adam Sandler's titular character exclaims, "Gold jacket, green jacket, who gives a shit?". Musically, the song was structured after "Mall of America" by Desaparecidos.

"First Breath, Last Breath" is written about "the perspective of losing your girlfriend/wife while she gives birth to your daughter". Nielsen's wife nearly died during childbirth in 2017. ""You Get So Alone at Times That It Just Makes Sense"" references the Charles Bukowski poetry book of the same name. The album itself is named after a line in a Bukowski poem, as was Let It Enfold You. Nielsen wrote "Stay What You Are" with the intention of emulating the sound of the early 2000s band Saves the Day. The track was written as a hypothetical, posthumous song about his wife, had she died in childbirth. It talks about her impact on his life and references one of their first dates being at a Saves the Day show. "If There Is Light, It Will Find You" was written to be an optimistic closer to the album. Nielsen commented on the song, saying, "What am I supposed to do when I become more connected to people, but eventually I'm going to lose them? It's all going to be okay because no matter what, there is a light figuratively and literally that always sort of shines into dark places and illuminates them."

== Release ==
On November 30, 2017, If There Is Light, It Will Find You was announced for released. In addition, the album's artwork and track listing were revealed, and "Double Cross" was made available for streaming. On January 9, 2018, drummer Chris Hornbrook parted ways with the band, and was replaced by Steve Carey of the Color Morale. On January 11, a music video was released for "Gold Jacket, Green Jacket...". The video sees Nielsen annoying everyone he meets, either intentionally or by accident. He subsequently ends up at a house party. Nielsen said the clip was a combination of Falling Down (1993) crossed with the sing-along scene from Billy Madison (1995). On February 1, "New Jersey Makes, the World Takes" was made available for streaming via Alternative Press's website. If There Is Light, It Will Find You was released on February 16 through independent label Pure Noise Records. With a line-up of Nielsen, guitarists Caswell and Jason Milbank, bassist Greg Styliades and aforementioned Carey, the group went on a headlining US tour in February and March. They were supported by Reggie and the Full Effect, Have Mercy and Household.

In May, they embarked on a North American tour with support from Sharptooth and Lil Lotus. Following this, the group appeared on the Warped Tour. On January 4, 2019, a music video was released for "Elevator to the Gallows", directed by John Mark. The clip features the band going through various tasks in an attempt to win Demi Lovato's affection, ranging from learning to dance to eating food she enjoys. Nielsen said all of the members were big fans of Lovato and had previously tried to get her to acknowledge them on Twitter, so they decided to make a video about that. Lovato subsequently saw the video, posting about it in her Twitter and included it as part of her Instagram story. Following this, the band went on a co-headlining US tour with the Amity Affliction in January and February. They were originally supported by Bad Omens and Belmont. However Bad Omens later dropped off the tour due to signed contract agreements not being fulfilled. They were replaced by Silent Planet.

== Reception ==
Professional ratings
Review scores
Source	Rating
AllMusic	3.5/5 stars
The Aquarian Weekly	Favorable
Dead Press!	7/10 stars
idobi	8/10 stars
Rock Sound	8/10
Ultimate Guitar	8.3/10

The album peaked at 57 on the Billboard 200. In addition, it topped the US Hard Rock Albums chart.

If There Is Light, It Will Find You received generally positive reviews. Neil Z. Yueng from AllMusic stated the album was " heavy, cathartic, and honest statement from [the band]" and it features "punchy punk blasts while maintaining a trademark helpless and nihilistic mood." idobi Radio also praised the album's emotion, calling it a "current punk masterpiece".

== Track listing ==
Writing credits via BMI.

All lyrics are written by Buddy Nielsen.

No.	Title	Music	Length
1.	"Double Cross"	Buddy Nielsen; Beau Burchell	3:25
2.	"Elevator to the Gallows"	Nielsen; Burchell	3:44
3.	"New Jersey Makes, the World Takes"	Nielsen; Burchell	2:59
4.	"Gold Jacket, Green Jacket..."	Nielsen; Burchell; Gavin Caswell	3:34
5.	"First Breath, Last Breath"	Nielsen; Burchell	2:55
6.	"Ancient Gods"	Nielsen; Burchell	3:47
7.	"Is It Gonna Be the Year?"	Nielsen; Burchell; Caswell	4:01
8.	""You Get So Alone at Times That It Just Makes Sense""	Nielsen; Burchell	4:21
9.	"Orlando and a Miscarriage"	Nielsen; Burchell; Caswell	2:11
10.	"Shaking Hands"	Nielsen; Burchell	4:06
11.	"Stay What You Are"	Nielsen; Burchell	3:31
12.	"If There Is Light, It Will Find You"	Nielsen; Burchell	6:18
Total length:			44:52

== Personnel ==
Personnel per booklet, except where noted.

Senses Fail

- James "Buddy" Nielsen – lead vocals
- Greg Styliades – bass
- Gavin Caswell – guitar
- Jason Milbank – guitar

Additional musicians

- Dan Trapp – drums

Production

- Beau Burchell – producer, engineer, mixing
- Blake Bunzel – assistant engineer
- Mike Kalajian – mastering
- Jonathan Weiner – photography
- Ian Rees – artwork, layout

== Charts ==
Chart (2018)	Peak position
US Billboard 200	57
US Top Alternative Albums (Billboard)	2
US Top Hard Rock Albums (Billboard)	1
US Independent Albums (Billboard)	1
US Top Rock Albums (Billboard)	3
