= 119 (album) =

Studio album by Trash Talk
- Released: October 9, 2012
- Genres: Hardcore punk; crossover thrash
- Length: 21:57
- Labels: Trash Talk Collective; Odd Future; RED
- Producer: Trash Talk

Trash Talk chronology
| Eyes & Nines (2010) | 119 (2012) | No Peace (2014) |

Singles from 119
- 1. "F.E.B.N." Released: August 30, 2012

Professional ratings
Aggregate scores
| Source | Rating |
|---|---|
| Metacritic | 67/100 |
Review scores
| Source | Rating |
| NME | 8/10 stars |
| This Is Fake DIY | 7/10 stars |
| AbsolutePunk | 7/10 stars |
| Pitchfork | 7.4/10 |
| Consequence of Sound | C+ |
| Tiny Mix Tapes | 2.5/5 stars |
| Under the Radar | 6/10 stars |
| The New York Times | (favourable) |
| AllMusic | 3/5 stars |
| No Ripcord | 6/10 stars |

119 is the fourth studio album by American hardcore punk band Trash Talk, released on October 9, 2012 via Trash Talk Collective along with Odd Future Records and RED Distribution. It is the first album by the band to be released on Odd Future Records, after Trash Talk signed with Odd Future's label on May 30, 2012. It is also the first studio album to be released on the label that is not performed by a member of Odd Future.

== Promotion ==
In July, Christian Clancy, a Odd Future manager, posted on the 4 Strikes Management Twitter, announcing multiple albums, including the Trash Talk album.

The album art was released along with the cover from another release on the label, Numbers, by MellowHype. The albums were eventually released on the same day as each other.

=== Singles ===
The single and music video for the song, "F.E.B.N.", was released, and the music video was uploaded on YouTube, both on the same day of August 30, 2012.

== Reception ==
Upon release, 119 was met with positive reviews by critics. At Metacritic, which assigns a weighted mean rating out of 100, the album received a 67 out of 100 based on 18 reviews, which indicates "generally favorable reviews".

On a positive review with NME, writer Kelly Murray wrote, "The most obvious progressions are the band’s clearer song structures and Lee Spielman’s vocals. The frontman screams his way through 14 songs in 22 minutes, as co-vocalist Spencer Pollard roars like a territorial lion from the shadows behind. The pair are explosive, and joined by guitarist Garrett Stevenson and drummer Sam Bosson, they cater for every element of hardcore as the album lingers on the edge of metal and the West Coast toxicity of The Bronx, Circle Jerks and Black Flag."

== Track listing ==
| No. | Title | Length |
|---|---|---|
| 1. | "Eat the Cycle" | 2:18 |
| 2. | "Exile on Broadway" | 1:12 |
| 3. | "My Rules" | 1:03 |
| 4. | "F.E.B.N." | 1:35 |
| 5. | "Uncivil Disobedience" | 1:16 |
| 6. | "Blossom & Burn" (featuring Hodgy Beats and Tyler, the Creator) | 2:31 |
| 7. | "Reasons" | 2:14 |
| 8. | "Fuck Nostalgia" | 1:51 |
| 9. | "Apathy" | 1:47 |
| 10. | "Thanks, But No Thanks" | 1:21 |
| 11. | "Bad Habits" | 1:08 |
| 12. | "Swinging to Pieces" | 0:53 |
| 13. | "For the Lesser Good" | 0:27 |
| 14. | "Dogman" | 2:20 |

== Personnel ==
Trash Talk

- Lee Spielman – vocals
- Garrett Stevenson – guitar
- Spencer Pollard – bass, vocals
- Sam Bosson – drums

Additional personnel

- Hodgy Beats – guest vocals on "Blossom & Burn"
- Tyler, The Creator – guest vocals on "Blossom & Burn"

== Chart positions ==
| Chart (2012) | Peak position |
|---|---|
| UK Rock & Metal Albums (Official Charts) | 30 |
| US Top Hard Rock Albums (Billboard) | 25 |
| US Heatseekers Albums (Billboard) | 15 |
