= Saosin (album) =

Studio album by Saosin
- Released: September 26, 2006
- Recorded: 2004–2006
- Genres: Post-hardcore; emo; alternative rock
- Length: 41:21
- Label: Capitol
- Producer: Howard Benson

Saosin chronology
| Saosin EP (2005) | Saosin (2006) | Come Close (2008) |

Singles from Saosin
- 1. "Voices" Released: September 5, 2006; 2. "Bury Your Head" Released: 2006; 3. "You're Not Alone" Released: April 1, 2007; 4. "Collapse" Released: May 17, 2007; 5. "It's Far Better to Learn" Released: October 23, 2007

Professional ratings
Review scores
| Source | Rating |
|---|---|
| AbsolutePunk.net | (95%) |
| AllMusic | 4/5 stars |
| Rolling Stone | 2.5/5 stars |
| Sputnikmusic | 3.5/5 stars |

Saosin is the debut studio album by American rock band Saosin, released on September 26, 2006 through Capitol Records. It is the band's second release to feature lead vocalist Cove Reber. The album is best known for its lead riffs with delays and natural harmonics as a form of creating melodies. The guitar riffs on the album were listed on Alternative Press's "Best Guitar Riffs of 2000s Rock." The first single, "Voices" was listed on the "Top 46 Post-hardcore Songs of the 2000s", and the second single, "You're Not Alone" was listed on the "Top 10 Essential Emo Power Ballads" by the Alternative Press.

The album explores themes such as interpersonal relationships. Some consider it to be a "scene album".

== Release ==
A limited-edition version of the album was also released and included a behind the scenes look into the making of the album as well as music videos of "Bury Your Head" (Saosin EP version) and "Lost Symphonies" (a song first included on the 2003 Translating the Name EP). The album was certified gold by the RIAA on May 5, 2026. The album has currently sold an estimated 800,000 copies worldwide. It was re-pressed on vinyl and released on September 27, 2024, 18 years after the original release.

== Track listing ==
All lyrics written by Cove Reber and Beau Burchell. All music composed by Saosin.

| No. | Title | Length |
|---|---|---|
| 1. | "It's Far Better to Learn" | 4:00 |
| 2. | "Sleepers" | 2:51 |
| 3. | "It's So Simple" | 2:48 |
| 4. | "Voices" | 3:37 |
| 5. | "Finding Home" | 3:09 |
| 6. | "Follow and Feel" | 3:19 |
| 7. | "Come Close" | 3:15 |
| 8. | "I Never Wanted To" | 3:29 |
| 9. | "Collapse" | 3:15 |
| 10. | "You're Not Alone" | 4:02 |
| 11. | "Bury Your Head" | 3:34 |
| 12. | "Some Sense of Security" | 4:04 |

Japan and iTunes Bonus Track
| No. | Title | Length |
|---|---|---|
| 13. | "Let Go Control" | 2:58 |

Best Buy Bonus Track
| No. | Title | Length |
|---|---|---|
| 1. | "Voices" (Acoustic) | 3:55 |

Limited Edition Bonus DVD
| No. | Title | Length |
|---|---|---|
| 1. | "Bury Your Head" (Demo Version) | 3:29 |
| 2. | "Lost Symphonies" (Live at the Glasshouse) | 3:00 |

== Usage in popular media ==
- 2007 KROQ New ROQ (2006) – "Voices"
- The Best of Taste of Chaos Two (2007) – "Follow and Feel"
- ATV Offroad Fury Pro (2007) – "Sleepers"
- Burnout Dominator (2007) – "Collapse"
- Saw IV: Original Motion Picture Soundtrack (2007) – "Collapse"
- Reef: Bobby Martinez Mixed Tape (2007) – "It's Far Better to Learn"
- MX vs. ATV: Untamed (2007) – "Collapse"
- Burnout Paradise (2008) – "Collapse"

== Personnel ==
Saosin album personnel as listed on AllMusic.

Saosin

- Cove Reber - lead vocals, piano
- Justin Shekoski - lead guitar, backing vocals
- Beau Burchell - rhythm guitar, keyboard, piano, programming, backing vocals
- Chris Sorenson - bass guitar, backing vocals, additional keyboards
- Alex Rodriguez - drums

Additional musicians

- Howard Benson - additional keyboards/programming

Artwork

- Martin Kvamme - graphic design

Production

- Howard Benson - producer
- Beau Burchell - producer
- Louie Bandak & Ron Laffitte - A&R
- Paul DeCarli - digital editing
- Hatsukazu "Hatch" Inagaki - assistant engineer
- Ted Jensen - mastering
- Chris Lord-Alge - mixing
- Jon Nicholson - drum technician
- Mike Plotnikoff - engineer
- Arthur Spivak - management
- Marc VanGool - guitar technician
- Wiley Gutchell - bass technician

== Charts ==
Chart performance for Saosin
| Chart (2006) | Peak position |
|---|---|
| Australian Albums (ARIA) | 57 |
| US Billboard 200 | 22 |

== Certifications ==
| Region | Certification | Certified units/sales |
|---|---|---|
| United States (RIAA) | Gold | 500,000^{‡} |
^{‡} Sales+streaming figures based on certification alone.
