= Honey (Open Hand album) =

Studio album by Open Hand
- Released: April 20, 2010
- Genre: Indie rock, experimental rock, neo-psychedelia, stoner rock
- Length: 50:57
- Label: Anodyne Records, Blacktop Records

Open Hand chronology
You and Me (2005)	Honey (2010)	Weirdo (2021)

Honey is the third studio album by American rock group Open Hand.

Originally released by Anodyne Records in April 2010, a released a remixed, remastered, and re-sequenced version of Honey (featuring a shortened track list) was released for its 10th anniversary by Blacktop Records in April 2020.

== Track listing ==
=== Original release ===
No.	Title	Length
1.	"Herons" (Featuring Matt Talbott)	4:38
2.	"Bre"	3:02
3.	"The Hand"	3:49
4.	"Son of a Gun" (Featuring Brodie Rush)	3:57
5.	"So Far"	3:25
6.	"Honey" (Featuring Matt Talbott)	3:19
7.	"Old Hat"	2:32
8.	"The Valley" (Featuring Christopher "Kid" Reid)	2:54
9.	"Cartwright Kid"	3:26
10.	"Risky"	2:25
11.	"So Low"	3:11
12.	"Cool"	1:59
13.	"What Is This?"	1:46
14.	"Pilgrim"	1:25
15.	"The Angels"	1:55
16.	"Golden"	1:48
17.	"Midnight Sun"	5:26

=== 2020 re-release ===
No.	Title	Length
1.	"The Hand"	4:38
2.	"Cool"	1:59
3.	"Honey" (Featuring Matt Talbott)	3:25
4.	"Old Hat"	2:41
5.	"Bre"	3:02
6.	"So Far"	3:25
7.	"Cartwright Kid"	3:26
8.	"Son of a Gun" (Featuring Brodie Rush)	3:57
9.	"Midnight Sun"	5:26
10.	"Herons" (Featuring Matt Talbott)	4:38
