= Rob Goraieb =

American musician

- Origin: United States
- Genres: Rock, Alternative rock, Indie rock
- Occupations: Songwriter, Guitarist, Singer
- Years active: 1990s–present
- Labels: Zomba Music Group, Crank! A Record Company, Not Lame Recordings, Mint Jelly
- Website: robgoraieb.com

Rob Goraieb is an American songwriter, guitarist and singer.

== Biography ==
Rob Goraieb formed Kosmos Express, exclusively signed to Zomba Music Group record labels, and was also the leader of The Get Set on Crank! A Record Company.

In 2003, Goraieb released a solo record, Apartment 305 (B/R/M Records and Not Lame Recordings). Produced by Rob Laufer, guests on the record include bassist Dan Schwartz and drummer Mark Powell. Apartment 305 featured the songs "Soho (I Can Make It So)" and "Get It Right.”

Goraieb got his start with Gleaming Spires, the band for Sparks, performing on Gleaming Spires' record, Funk For Children (released on the Posh Boy Records/Vodka Label). Gleaming Spires is best known for their hit song, "Are You Ready for the Sex Girls?”

He was also a founding member of Clash of Symbols. Goraieb co-wrote two records, the E.P. Sunday Is An Altogether Different Proposition (IceHouse Records/Tone Box Records) and the full-length CD Begging at the Temple Gate Called Beautiful (Brainstorm Artists International/Tone Box Records), featuring Mike Stand of the Altar Boys.

Rob Goraieb also recorded and toured with King Holiday and Just Plain Big (Double Deuce/Caroline Records).

In 2011, Goraieb released the single Underground. In 2021, he released the single Many Are The Trials. In 2022, he released the single Go With You. And in 2025, Goraieb released the full-length album Antenna. All of these releases were on the Australian record label Mint Jelly Records.

Goraieb is now focused on songwriting for TV and film.

== Select discography ==
- Now (1997)
- Simulcast (1998)
- Down Marriott Lane! (2002)
- Apartment 305 (2003)
- Down Marriott Lane! (Japanese release on Trident Style Records with bonus tracks 2004)
- Liberty EP (bootleg/unreleased acoustic demos 2004)
- Underground (single 2011)
- Many Are The Trials (single 2021)
- Go With You (single 2022)
- Antenna (2025)

== Television and movies ==
Rob Goraieb songs have appeared in:

- The Moment of Truth 2: Take a Stand (Truth Soul Armor 1997)
- ESPN Extreme (ESPN 1998)
- The Climb (World Wide Pictures 2002)
- Roswell (Warner Bros./20th Century Fox/UPN 2004)
- Friday Night Lights (NBC/Universal 2007)
- The Black Donnellys (NBC/Universal 2007)
- Today Show (NBC 2007)
- Everwood (The WB/Warner Bros. re-release 2008)
- Life (NBC 2008)
- Redline (Madhouse/Tohokushinsha Film 2009)
- Jack & Bobby (The WB 2004/2009-release)
- I Just Want My Pants Back (MTV 2012)

== Theater ==
Rob Goraieb songs have appeared in:

- Run Baby Run – The Life Story of Nicky Cruz (New York stage show/co-wrote "I've Been Set Free" closing song/TRUCE Productions 2001)
