= The Get Set =

American rock/alt-pop band

The Get Set was a Los Angeles, California rock/alt-pop band.

== Biography ==
Formed in 2001, Los Angeles-based The Get Set featured Rob Goraieb and Mark Powell who were previously in the band Kosmos Express.

The Get Set's 2001 debut Down Marriott Lane! was released on Crank! A Record Company and featured the song "Best Friend (I Was About To Be)". It was produced by Rob Laufer.

== Band members ==
- Rob Goraieb: Lead Vocals, Guitar, Songwriter
- Mark Powell: Drumset, Background Vocals
- Chris Diede: Wurlitzer/Piano, Background Vocals
- Gerry Valvona: Bass
