= Balaguer Guitars =

American guitar manufacturer

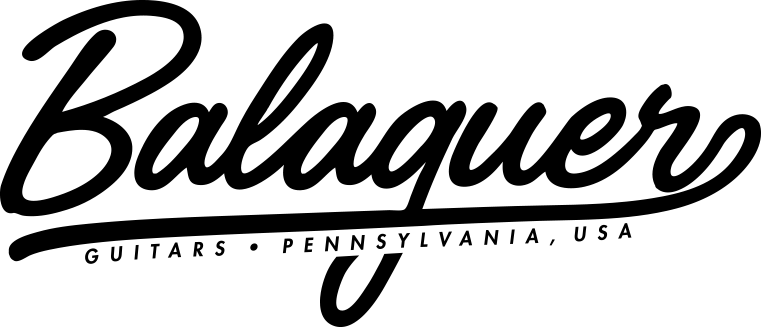
- Type: Private
- Industry: Musical Instruments
- Founded: 2015
- Founder: Joe Balaguer
- Headquarters: Pottstown, Pennsylvania, United States
- Area served: Worldwide
- Products: Electric guitar, electric bass guitar
- Website: Official website

Balaguer Guitars is an American manufacturer of solid and semi-hollow bodied electric guitars and basses. They were founded in 2015 and are headquartered in Pottstown, Pennsylvania.

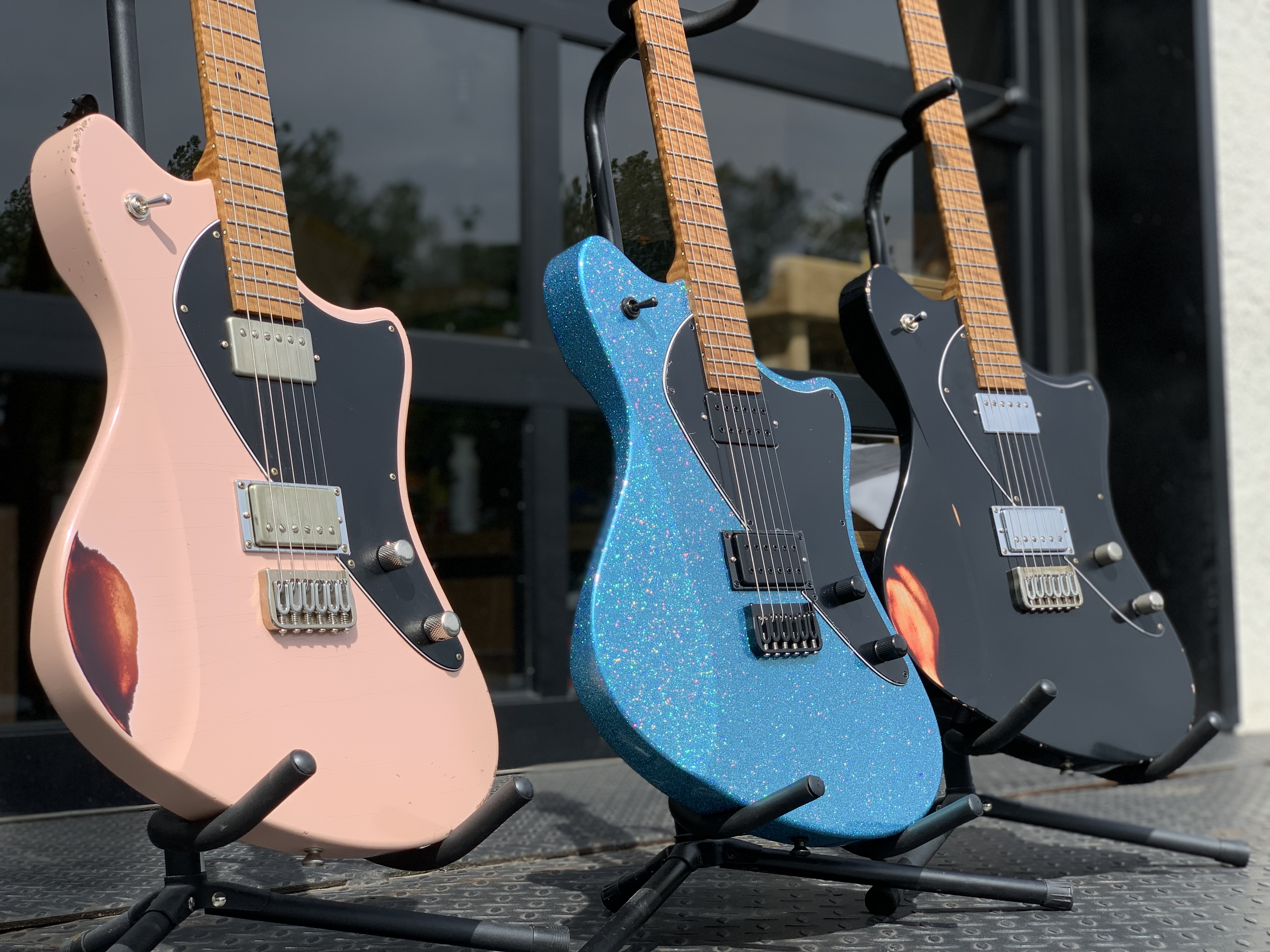
Balaguer Guitars USA Series Espada

== History ==
Joe Balaguer, founder and owner of the Balaguer Guitars, graduated from the Guitar Craft Academy, a luthiery program at Los Angeles' Musicians Institute, in 2009. Remaining in Southern California, he would continue to hone his luthiery experience by working in vintage guitar repair and restoration, and after a short period would begin to produce his own custom builds, artist collaborations, and limited runs under the Balaguer Guitars name. In 2015, following a successful crowd funding campaign built on the reputation he and his guitars had developed, Joe would relocate to his home state of Pennsylvania and officially found Balaguer Guitars on the principal "where vintage inspiration meets modern design".

== Instruments ==
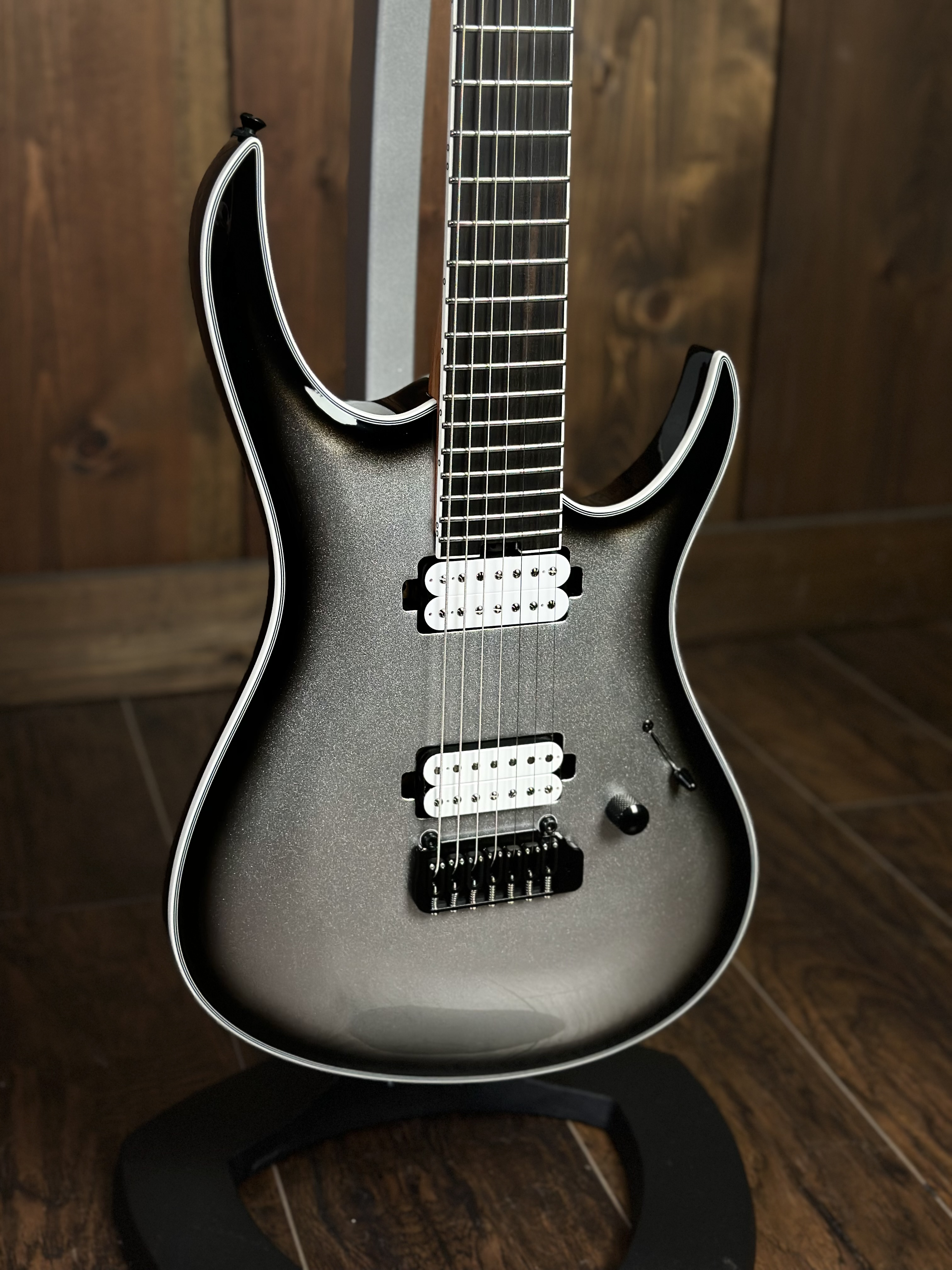
Balaguer Guitars Select Custom Diablo Silverburst 7-String

Balaguer Guitars offers multiple build options, including Select Custom, which allows customers to choose their own specifications for a guitar or bass, as well as the USA, Select, and Standard Series guitars and basses, which are limited runs of Balaguer Guitars models built with pre-chosen specifications. Also built by Balaguer Guitars is the Heritage Series, which consists of one-off, fully custom guitars and basses built entirely by Joe Balaguer and the USA team, as well as the Signature Series, which is a selection of models that have been designed in collaboration with Balaguer Guitars artists across the music industry. Current and former Signature Series Artists include Beau Burchell of Saosin, Travis Miguel of Atreyu, Devin Shidaker of The Acacia Strain, Tony Pizzuti of Sleeping with Sirens, Dan O'Connor of Four Year Strong, Andy Williams of ex-Every Time I Die, and Ryan "Fluff" Bruce of ex-Dragged Under.

== Artists ==
- Beau Burchell – Saosin
- Travis Miguel – Atreyu
- Tony Pizzuti – Sleeping with Sirens / The Word Alive
- Devin Shidaker – The Acacia Strain
- Dan O'Connor – Four Year Strong
- Amos Heller – Taylor Swift
- Andy Williams – Every Time I Die
- Ryan "Fluff" Bruce - Dragged Under/ Rest, Repose
- Mitch Stark – Silent Planet
- Andy Thomas – Rivers of Nihil
- Matt Deis – All That Remains / CKY
- Mike Stringer – Spiritbox
- Kevin Otten – Knocked Loose
- Asger Mygind – Vola
- Nolan Ashley – Kublai Khan
- Tyler Szalkowski – State Champs
- Gino Sgambelluri – Dayseeker
- Sean Price – Erra
- Ryan Mendez - Yellowcard
