= Balaguer (disambiguation) =

Balaguer is a town in Catalonia, Spain.

Balaguer may also refer to:

== People ==
- Asunción Balaguer (1925–2019), a Spanish actress
- David Balaguer, a Spanish handball player
- Juan Carlos Balaguer, a Spanish goalkeeper
- Joaquín Balaguer (1906–2002), three-term (for a total of 24 years) president of the Dominican Republic
- José Ramón Balaguer Cabrera (1932–2022), Cuban politic and diplomat.
- Rosa Balaguer, a Spanish gymnast

== Other ==
- Balaguer Guitars, an American musical instrument manufacturer
