= Name Taken =

American rock band from Orange, California

- Origin: Orange, California, U.S.
- Genres: Alternative rock; indie rock; pop punk; emo
- Years active: 1999–2005; 2007; 2018
- Labels: Dying Wish; Fiddler; Top Notch
- Past members: Chad Atkinson; Blake Means; Ryan Edwards; Juan Pereda; Danny Valencia; Bret Meisenbach

Name Taken was an American rock band from Orange, California. They were originally known as All That's Left until they discovered in October 1999 that the name was already taken; thus the name "Name Taken". The band started in the ninth grade where they would play shows in their amphitheatre at lunch. They later succeeded to record for such compilations as Atticus I and Warped Tour 2002.

== History ==
The band began practicing in a basement in their drummer's house. With each of the members being only 14 or 15 years old, they played shows at backyard parties and church dances. After parting ways with one of their guitarists, Chad Atkinson, Blake Means and Bret Meisenbach (former drummer) headed into the studio to record a demo, still under the name All That's Left. They produced, printed, and sold The Stupid Chad EP by themselves. Shortly after, they decided to add a second guitarist, Ryan Edwards. They also discovered that there was another band under the name All That's Left, so they decided a change was necessary. The title "Name Taken" was chosen. In August 2001, with a new guitar section and a new name, the band went into Love Juice Laboratories in Riverside, CA, to record yet another EP. After 3 days of recording, the EP The Silent Game was born. The recording was quickly picked up by Top Notch Records and put into pressing and released roughly 3 or 4 months later. In the following months, their drummer planned to leave Name Taken; he was replaced by Danny Valencia of Downey, CA. Now with Name Taken's line-up in full force, the band had been picked up by One Moment Management, appeared on numerous compilation CDs, and showcased for numerous record labels. In December 2002, the band embarked on a West Coast US tour. The band played shows in California with groups such as Yellowcard, Rufio, and Saosin, and toured with Alexisonfire, Silverstein, Midtown, Home Grown, and Senses Fail.

In October 2003, the band played with Spitalfield on their tour of the US. In December 2003, the band signed to Fiddler Records. In January 2004, the band release a demo version of "It Sounds Prettier in Spanish" online. Hold On was released on April 13, 2004. To promote it, the band went on tour with Salem, From First to Last, and Scatter the Ashes, until June. From here, they toured with Gatsbys American Dream and Bear vs. Shark until early July 2004. In July and August 2004, the group went on tour with Fall Out Boy, Bayside, Armor for Sleep, and The Academy Is.... They then toured with the Beautiful Mistake, Tokyo Rose, My New Life and Mock Orange in October 2004. Name Taken closed out the year touring with the Beautiful Mistake. On January 22, 2005, the music video for "Control" was posted online. They opened in 2005 and toured with Relient K and Mae. The band announced they were breaking up on May 18, 2005 after two years of touring to pursue their college education. Chad and Blake attended Cal State Fullerton, while Ryan attended University of California, Berkeley and went on to earn a PhD from Cornell University.

In February 2007, they announced that they were due to play two reunion shows on May 5 and May 6, 2007, at Anaheim's Chain Reaction. Paul Riscalla assisted with drum duties for the shows. Despite the fact that both shows were sold out, the band never regrouped to record a new album. On November 28, 2007, a message from Blake appeared on absolutepunk.net saying that Name Taken would in fact not be reforming and that the shows were just for fun. They released their first song in 14 years, "Blood And Bones", in July 2018, followed by a 2007 home demo of "Nanking" in 2022.

The lyrics to the band's song "Panic" are said to have been the inspiration for the name of the platinum-selling band Panic! at the Disco. This was featured on an episode of the TV show "Jeopardy" in 2024.

Panic at the disco
Sat back and took it so slow
Are you nervous? Are you shaking?

== Reception ==
- "Ignoring the uninspired power chord conventions of their scene, they chase each other across their respective fretboards forming tightly woven patterns." - AbsolutePunk review of The Silent Game
- "It's more emo on the brain...roils with the urgent, slickly produced fury that defines so much of this genre." - Allmusic review of Hold On
- "...an album that admittedly sounds a lot like every other emo-punk band in the genre, but still contains the energy and sense of melody that most of the other bands forget about." - Punknews.org review of Hold On

== Band members ==
Final line-up

- Chad Atkinson - Vocals/Bass
- Ryan Edwards - Guitar
- Blake Means - Guitar

Early members

- Juan Pereda - Drums (never played on any records)
- Danny Valencia - Drums
- Bret Meisenbach - Drums

== Discography ==
- The Stupid Chad EP (Independent, 2000)
- The Silent Game (Top Notch Records, 2001)
- Hold Your Breath, You Know How Long (unreleased, 2002)
- Bayside/Name Taken split (Dying Wish Records, 2003)
- Hold On (Fiddler Records, 2004)
- Blood and Bones (Single) (Independent, 2018)
- Nanking 2007 Home Demo (Unreleased Demo from 2007) (Independent, 2022)
