= Eyes & Nines =

Album by Trash Talk

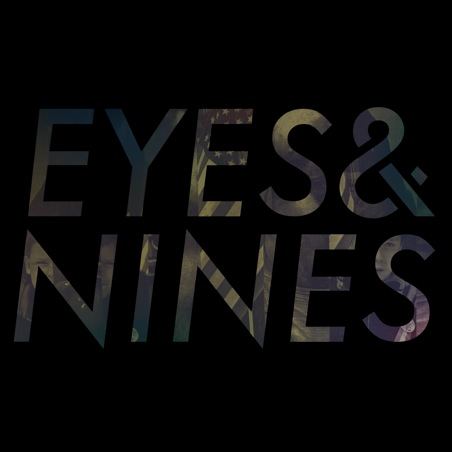

Studio album by Trash Talk
- Released: May 18, 2010 (Digital); June 8, 2010 (CD, LP)
- Recorded: Big Game Lodge
- Genre: Thrashcore; crossover thrash
- Length: 17:29
- Label: Trash Talk Collective (US); Hassle Records (Europe); Alliance Trax/Six Feet Under Records (Japan); Shock (Australia)
- Producer: Joby J. Ford

Trash Talk chronology
Trash Talk (2008)	Eyes & Nines (2010)	119 (2012)

Singles from Trash Talk
- 1. "Explode" Released: 2010

Professional ratings
Aggregate scores
Source	Rating
Metacritic	83/100
Review scores
Source	Rating
Alternative Press	4/5 stars
Decibel	8/10
Drowned in Sound	6/10
The Fly	4/5 stars
The Music	4.5/5 stars
NME	7/10
Pitchfork	7.8/10
Q	4/5 stars
Rock Sound	10/10
The Skinny	4/5 stars

Eyes & Nines is the third studio album by American hardcore punk band Trash Talk. It was released on May 18, 2010 digitally and June 8, 2010 on CD/LP by the band's own record label Trash Talk Collective.

== Background and release ==
On February 3 they stated on their blog 'Manifest Destination' that they had been hard at work writing and recording the album 'Eyes & Nines'. The album was available for preorder, and those who did so received a digital copy of the single 'Explode' and the music video for the single instantly.

== Track listing ==
No.	Title	Length
1.	"Vultures"	0:58
2.	"Flesh & Blood"	1:54
3.	"Explode"	2:35
4.	"Hash Wednesday"	4:30
5.	"Envy / More"	0:44
6.	"Rabbit Holes"	1:01
7.	"I Do"	0:39
8.	"Trudge"	1:35
9.	"On a Fix"	1:20
10.	"Eyes & Nines"	2:13

== Personnel ==
- Lee Spielman - Vocals
- Garrett Stevenson - Guitar
- Spencer Pollard - Bass and Vocals
- Sam Bosson - Drums
- Greg Hetson - Additional guitar in "Vultures"
- Matt Caughthran - Additional vocals in "Explode" and "Rabbit Holes"
- Luis Hernandez - Additional vocals in "Hash Wednesday" and "On A Fix"
- Jorma Vik - Additional percussion in "Eyes & Nines"
- Joby J. Ford - Producer
- Dave Schiffman - Mixing
- Beau Burchell - Mastering

== Chart positions ==
Chart (2010)	Peak position
US Heatseekers Albums (Billboard)	36
