= Translating the Name =

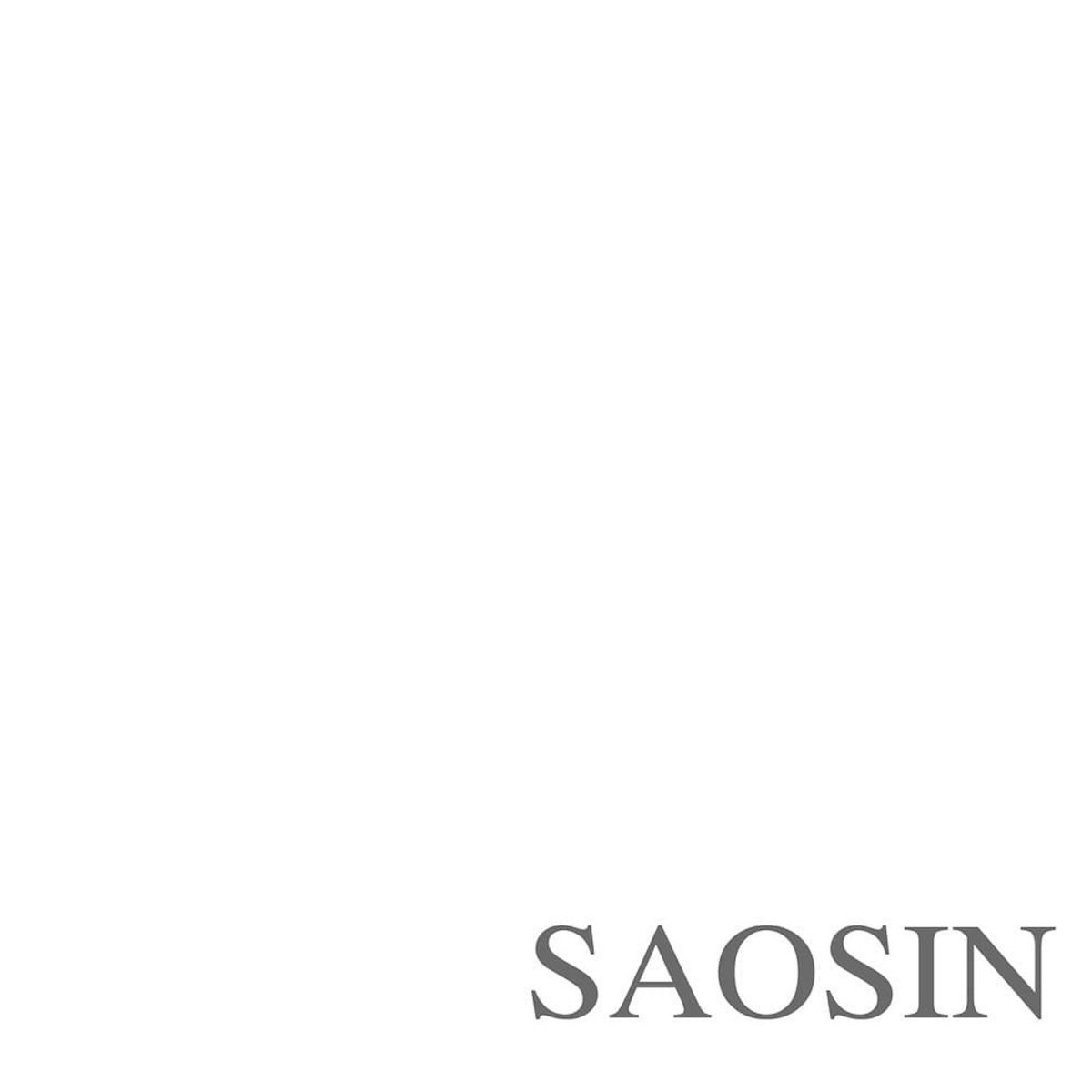

EP by Saosin
- Released: June 17, 2003
- Recorded: 2003
- Genres: Post-hardcore, screamo, emo
- Length: 15:03
- Label: Death Do Us Part
- Producer: Beau Burchell

Saosin chronology
Translating the Name (2003)	Saosin EP (2005)

Singles from Translating the Name EP
- 1. "Seven Years" Released: 2003; 2. "3rd Measurement in C" Released: 2003

Professional ratings
Review scores
Source	Rating
AllMusic	4/5 stars
Punknews.org	4/5 stars

Translating the Name is the debut EP by American rock band Saosin, released on June 17, 2003 through Death Do Us Part. The album was released before Anthony Green’s initial departure from the band to form the rock band Circa Survive (Green later returned on Saosin's 2016 album, Along the Shadow). It is also the band's only release to feature bass guitarist Zack Kennedy, as well as the only release to not feature drummer Alex Rodriguez. Guitarist Beau Burchell stated that Rodriguez intended to track the drums for Translating the Name but had a prior commitment with his former band Open Hand before he could join. Pat Magrath was hired as a session musician, and Magrath performed with Saosin briefly before Rodriguez joined.

Translating the Name has been noted as one of the most influential and structured post-hardcore releases of the 2000s. Alternative Press said the album contains "emo lyrics, speedy tempos and intense vocals," and stated the opinion that the album represents scene music.

== Release ==
Translating the Name was released on June 17, 2003 through the label Death Do Us Part. A bonus disc, featuring exclusive acoustic demos, was shipped with early pre-orders.

A limited vinyl release was sold to attendees of the band's October 2022 tour.

== Reception ==
Translating the Name was reviewed as "excellent", with a rating of 4 out of 5 stars, by Sputnik Music.

== Track listing ==
No.	Title	Length
1.	"Seven Years"	3:12
2.	"Translating the Name"	3:26
3.	"3rd Measurement in C"	2:38
4.	"Lost Symphonies"	2:55
5.	"They Perched on Their Stilts, Pointing and Daring Me to Break Custom"	2:51

Bonus disc
No.	Title	Length
1.	"Seven Years" (Acoustic)	3:06
2.	"3rd Measurement in C" (Acoustic)	3:10

== Charts ==
Chart (2005)	Peak position
US Heatseekers Albums (Billboard)	27
US Independent Albums (Billboard)	36

== Personnel ==
Saosin

- Anthony Green – lead vocals, additional guitars
- Justin Shekoski – guitars, backing vocals
- Beau Burchell – guitars, programming, backing vocals, production, sound engineer, mixing
- Zach Kennedy – bass

Additional personnel

- Pat Magrath – drums, percussion
- Sean Sullivan – additional engineer, mastering, mixing
- Joby J. Ford – graphic design
