= In Search of Solid Ground =

Studio album by Saosin
- Released: September 8, 2009
- Recorded: 2008–2009
- Genre: Post-hardcore; alternative rock; emo
- Length: 56:36
- Label: Virgin
- Producer: Beau Burchell; Chris Sorenson; John Feldmann; Butch Walker; Lucas Banker

Saosin chronology
The Grey EP (2008)	In Search of Solid Ground (2009)	Along the Shadow (2016)

Singles from In Search of Solid Ground
- 1. "Is This Real" Released: August 4, 2009; 2. "On My Own" Released: August 4, 2009; 3. "Changing" Released: August 11, 2009; 4. "Deep Down" Released: 2010

Original album artwork
- The original cover art for In Search of Solid Ground that was met with a negative reaction.

Professional ratings
Review scores
Source	Rating
AbsolutePunk	64%
AllMusic	3.5/5 stars
Punknews.org	2.5/5 stars
Sputnikmusic	2.5/5

In Search of Solid Ground is the second studio album by American rock band Saosin, released on September 8, 2009 through Virgin Records. Recording sessions for the album saw Saosin recording with multiple producers such as Butch Walker, John Feldman, and Lucas from Matt Squire's production team. Five songs off the album were self-produced by the band's guitarist Beau Burchell and bass guitarist Chris Sorenson. The album is also the last release to feature lead vocalist Cove Reber and guitarist Justin Shekoski, until Reber later returned to Saosin in 2024.

== Background ==
PacSun hosted a listening party at 5pm in every PacSun store to hear the full album on September 7, 2009. The song "Why Can't You See" was made available on Last.fm. The full album was released in Japan on September 1, 2009 with the bonus track "You Never Noticed Me." The album was put on MySpace on September 4. The B-side "Move Slow" is included on the NCIS: Soundtrack – Vol. 2, which was released on November 3, 2009.

Reception of the album has been divided amongst fans due to the change in style. The album was removed from iTunes for unknown reasons, but it was made available again sometime in early 2012.

== Artwork ==
The original album artwork was revealed on July 13, 2009 by Alternative Press. The cover was immediately met with a negative reaction from fans causing Saosin to reevaluate their decision two days before the album was pressed. The band attempted to create something "high concept" with the original art, but the negative reaction helped the band realize that they "always keep things simple and strong and let the music speak for itself."

== Music ==
Three of the songs on the album are re-recordings of tracks from The Grey EP (2008). "I Keep My Secrets Safe" is a re-recording of "Keep Secrets". "Why Can't You See?" keeps the title of the song from the EP, and "The Worst of Me" is "Love Maker", the new name taken from a line in the chorus of the song.

The two songs "On My Own" and "Is This Real" were released as singles on iTunes August 4, 2009. The song "Changing" was released as a single August 11. The song "The Worst of Me" was released as a free song included in a Hurley Warped Tour pack.

== Track listing ==
All tracks are written by Beau Burchell, Cove Reber and Chris Sorenson, except for where noted.

No.	Title	Writer(s)	Length
1.	"I Keep My Secrets Safe"		3:54
2.	"Deep Down"	Burchell, Reber, Sorensen, David Bassett	3:25
3.	"Why Can't You See"		2:39
4.	"Changing"	Sorensen, Lucas Banker, Matt Squire	3:47
5.	"On My Own"		5:18
6.	"The Alarming Sound of a Still Small Voice"		4:42
7.	"Say Goodbye"		5:04
8.	"The Worst of Me"		3:35
9.	"It's All Over Now"		3:47
10.	"What Were We Made For?"	Burchell, Reber, Jeremy Griffith, Butch Walker	3:33
11.	"Is This Real"		3:58
12.	"Nothing Is What It Seems (Without You)"	Burchell, Reber, Sorensen, Griffith	4:25
13.	"Fireflies (Light Messengers)"		8:30

iTunes bonus tracks (Old)
No.	Title	Writer(s)	Length
14.	"Changing" (acoustic)	Sorensen, Banker, Squire	3:50
15.	"Bury Me"		4:25

iTunes bonus tracks (New)
No.	Title	Length
14.	"Bury Me"	4:25
15.	"The Alarming Sound" (instrumental demo)	4:36
16.	"Brikka Brikka" (instrumental demo)	3:46
17.	"Exfoliator" (instrumental demo)	4:09
18.	"Write Something Heavy and Fast" (instrumental demo)	3:56

Aussie Rules edition
No.	Title	Length
16.	"Fireflies (Light Messengers)" (live from Hurley Studios)	7:53

Japan/Amazon/PacSun bonus track
No.	Title	Length
16.	"You Never Noticed Me"	3:41

B-side
No.	Title	Length
1.	"Move Slow"	3:09

Best Buy deluxe edition "Making Of" DVD
No.	Title	Length
1.	"On My Own" (Behind the Scenes Video)
2.	"Is This Real" (Behind the Scenes Video)
3.	"The Alarming Sound of a Still Small Voice" (Behind the Scenes Video)
4.	"I Keep My Secrets Safe" (Behind the Scenes Video)
5.	"Fireflies" (Behind the Scenes Video)

== Personnel ==
Saosin

- Cove Reber – lead vocals, keyboards, piano
- Beau Burchell – rhythm guitar, vocals
- Justin Shekoski – lead guitar, vocals
- Chris Sorenson – bass, vocals
- Alex Rodriguez – drums, percussion

Additional musicians

- John Feldmann – programming, percussion, strings (track 2, 10)
- Butch Walker – programming, percussion (track 3, 5, 8, 9, 13), additional vocals (track 9)
- Jeremy S.H. Griffith – additional vocals (track 12)
- Scott Sorenson – additional vocals (track 12)
- Chris Sorenson – piano, programming, percussion (track 1, 6, 7, 11, 12), string arrangement (track 12)

Production

- Beau Burchell – engineering, mixing
- Chris Sorenson – art direction, concept, mixing, production (track 1, 6, 7, 11, 12)
- Jarrod Alexander – drum technician
- Matt "Hippie" Appleton – engineering
- John Feldmann – engineering, production (track 2, 10)
- Ken Floyd – guitar technician
- Logan Mader, Lucas Banker – engineering, production (track 4)
- Erik Ron – engineering
- Sean Stiegmeier – photography
- Butch Walker – production (track 3, 5, 8, 9, 13)
- Howie Weinberg – mastering
- Ryan Williams – engineering

== Charts ==
Chart performance for In Search of Solid Ground
Chart (2009)	Peak position
Australian Albums (ARIA)	69
Japanese Albums (Oricon)	56
US Billboard 200	19
US Billboard Alternative Albums	4
US Billboard Rock Albums	6
