= Pull the Thorns from Your Heart =

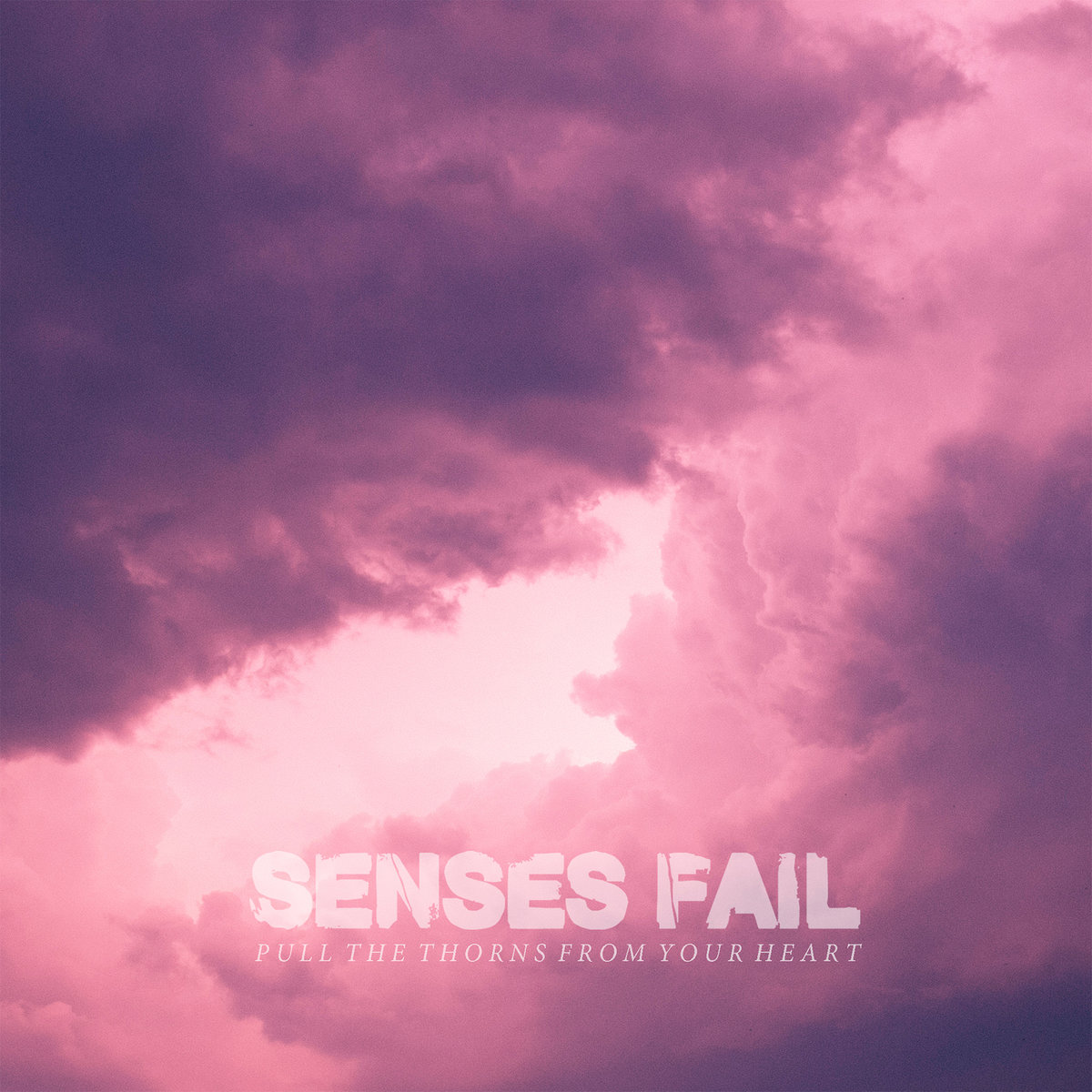

Studio album by Senses Fail
- Released: June 30, 2015
- Recorded: November 2014
- Studios: Lavish Studios and The Airport Studios, Burbank, California
- Genres: Metalcore, hardcore punk, heavy hardcore
- Length: 40:56
- Label: Pure Noise
- Producer: Shaun Lopez

Senses Fail chronology
| Renacer (2013) | Pull the Thorns from Your Heart (2015) | In Your Absence (2017) |

Senses Fail studio album chronology
| Renacer (2013) | Pull the Thorns from Your Heart (2015) | If There Is Light, It Will Find You (2018) |

Pull the Thorns from Your Heart is the sixth studio album by American post-hardcore band Senses Fail. In March and April 2015, the group supported Bayside on their headlining US tour. It was released on June 30 through Pure Noise Records. The album was recorded in November 2014 with producer Shaun Lopez.

== Background and production ==
Senses Fail released their fifth album Renacer through Vagrant Records imprint Staple Records in March 2013. It served as a transitional record for the band, showcasing them moving away from a pop-orientated sound to a heavier-direction, incorporating hardcore punk riffs and breakdowns. Few months after the album's release, vocalist Buddy Nielsen stated moving forward they would be exploring a "more metal, more hardcore, less melodic" direction. While touring in support of the record, Gavin Caswell took over bassist Jason Black's position. In January 2014, founding drummer Dan Trapp left the band, which he later announced publicly in May. The following month, Chris Hornbrook of Poison the Well was announced as their new drummer. Nielsen was enthusiastic about Hornbrook's inclusion as Poison the Well was an influence on him growing up and a major influence on Renacer.

In September and November, the group went on a 10-year anniversary tour for Let It Enfold You (2004). During their performance at Riot Fest, the band announced they had signed to independent label Pure Noise Records. On November 10, the band revealed their next album's title Pull the Thorns from Your Heart, which they began recording that same day. Sessions were helmed by producer Shaun Lopez in Burbank, California. Drums were tracked at Lavish Studios, before moving to Lopez's The Airport Studios. The recordings were mixed by Eric Stenman at Dragonfly Creek Recording in Malibu, California and Red Bull Studios in Los Angeles, California. Mastering was done by Eric Broyhill at Monster Lab Studios.

== Composition ==
Pull the Thorns from Your Heart was written in a period after Nielsen opened up about his personal life; he revealed his struggles with substance abuse and sex addiction, as well as coming out as queer. Additionally, Nielsen had a life-changing experience with Buddhism and a deep appreciation for Vipassanā meditation, which helped him with coming out. The album's title is taken from a poem by Sufi poet Rumi. Nielsen was a huge fan of his work and was enamored with what he knew about life. He explained that a lot of people have a difficult time in their lives and don't "truly get to live in the beauty that is life because there is so much wounding, so many defense mechanisms, and so much built up around our heart and conditioned behavior."

The album is broken down into four chapters – Annica & Sacca, Tisarana, Maransati and Brahmaviharas – all of which being named after Buddhist concepts. Nielsen noted that while the majority of music that showcases growth and change is more peaceful and abrasive, he wanted to "show that friction is what helps spur action. Without the friction, we wouldn't want to change, we would be content." All of the songs were written by the band except "The Courage of an Open Heart", "Dying Words" and "Pull the Thorns from Your Heart", which were written solely by Nielsen. Will Putney contributed additional writing to those three tracks, while Lopez did additional writing on "We Are All Returning Home". Half of the tracks deal with him coming out as queer, while the other half is about reaching a level of safety and reducing suffering.

== Release ==
On March 3, 2015, the group released a 7" split with labelmates Man Overboard. Senses Fail's contributions were a Pull the Thorns outtake "All You Need Is Already Within You" and a cover of Man Overboard's "Real Talk". In March and April, the group supported Bayside on their headlining US tour. On April 29, Pull the Thorns from Your Heart was announced for release in June. Alongside the announcement, a music video was released for "The Importance of the Moment of Death". The video is a "mythic representation of how innocence can be forcefully taken away from us as children, leaving us with too much too soon and without the proper coping skills." On May 26, "The Courage of an Open Heart" and "Wounds" were made available for streaming via Metal Hammer.

On June 17, a lyric video was released for "Carry the Weight". Pull the Thorns from Your Heart was made available for streaming on June 22, before being released on June 30 through Pure Noise Records. Between June and August, the group performed on the Warped Tour. A music video for "The Three Marks of Existence" premiered on July 9 via Substream Magazine. It was filmed in black and white and shot during the group's performances at Warped Tour. In September and November, the band supported Counterparts on their headlining European tour. In November and December, the group went on a co-headlining US tour with Silverstein. They were supported by Hundredth and Capsize. The band was due to tour Australia in March 2016, but as a result of family issues it was cancelled.

== Reception ==
Professional ratings
Review scores
| Source | Rating |
|---|---|
| AllMusic | 4/5 stars |
| The Aquarian Weekly | Favorable |
| Dead Press! | 8/10 stars |
| idobi | 8/10 stars |
| Kill Your Stereo | 85/100 |
| The Music | 2/5 stars |
| New Noise | Favorable |
| PopMatters | 8/10 stars |
| Punknews.org | 3.5/5 stars |
| Ultimate Guitar | 7.7/10 |

The album received positive reviews.

== Track listing ==
Writing credits per booklet.

I. Anicca & Sacca
| No. | Title | Writer(s) | Length |
|---|---|---|---|
| 1. | "The Three Marks of Existence" | James "Buddy" Nielsen; Gavin Caswell; Chris Hornbrook; Zack Roach; Matt Smith | 1:51 |
| 2. | "Carry the Weight" | Nielsen; Caswell; Hornbrook; Roach; Smith | 3:58 |
| 3. | "The Courage of an Open Heart" | Nielsen | 3:14 |

II. Trisarana
| No. | Title | Writer(s) | Length |
|---|---|---|---|
| 4. | "Wounds" | Nielsen; Caswell; Hornbrook; Roach; Smith | 3:48 |
| 5. | "Take Refuge" | Nielsen; Caswell; Hornbrook; Roach; Smith | 3:52 |
| 6. | "Surrender" | Nielsen; Caswell; Hornbrook; Roach; Smith | 5:13 |

III. Maranasati
| No. | Title | Writer(s) | Length |
|---|---|---|---|
| 7. | "Dying Words" | Nielsen | 2:47 |
| 8. | "The Importance of the Moment of Death" | Nielsen; Caswell; Hornbrook; Roach; Smith | 2:36 |
| 9. | "Pull the Thorns from Your Heart" | Nielsen | 3:56 |

IV. Brahmaviharas
| No. | Title | Writer(s) | Length |
|---|---|---|---|
| 10. | "We Are All Returning Home" | Nielsen; Caswell; Hornbrook; Roach; Smith | 3:52 |
| 11. | "My Fear of an Unlived Life" | Nielsen; Caswell; Hornbrook; Roach; Smith | 5:49 |
| Total length: | | | 40:56 |

== Personnel ==
Personnel per booklet.

Senses Fail

- James Nielsen – lead vocals
- Gavin Caswell – bass
- Chris Hornbrook – drums
- Zack Roach – guitar
- Matt Smith – guitar

Production

- Shaun Lopez – producer
- Eric Stenman – mixing
- Eric Broyhill – mastering
- Jamie M. Moore – artwork, layout

== Charts ==
| Chart (2015) | Peak position |
|---|---|
| US Billboard 200 | 109 |
| US Top Album Sales (Billboard) | 58 |
| US Top Alternative Albums (Billboard) | 15 |
| US Top Hard Rock Albums (Billboard) | 4 |
| US Independent Albums (Billboard) | 8 |
| US Top Rock Albums (Billboard) | 20 |
| US Vinyl Albums (Billboard) | 5 |
