= Along the Shadow =

Studio album by Saosin
- Released: May 20, 2016
- Recorded: 2015–16
- Genre: Post-hardcore
- Length: 39:31 (Standard)
- Label: Epitaph
- Producers: Beau Burchell; Chris Sorenson; Will Yip

Saosin chronology
In Search of Solid Ground (2009)	Along the Shadow (2016)

Singles from Along the Shadow
- 1. "The Silver String" Released: March 16, 2016; 2. "Racing Toward a Red Light" Released: April 5, 2016; 3. "Control and the Urge to Pray" Released: April 27, 2016; 4. "Ideology Is Theft" Released: June 17, 2016

Professional ratings
Aggregate scores
Source	Rating
Metacritic	74/100
Review scores
Source	Rating
AllMusic	4/5 stars
Exclaim!	9/10
Kerrang!	2/5 stars
Music Connection	8/10
Revolver	4/5
Rock Sound	7/10
Rolling Stone Australia	3.5/4 stars

Along the Shadow is the third studio album by American rock band Saosin, released on May 20, 2016, through Epitaph Records. The album marks the end of a three-and-a-half-year hiatus for the group with the return of original lead vocalist Anthony Green, which marks the band's only studio album to feature Green (as Green previously only featured on the band's first EP). It also marks the subsequent departure of lead guitarist Justin Shekoski.

== Track listing ==
No.	Title	Length
1.	"The Silver String"	3:57
2.	"Ideology Is Theft"	3:33
3.	"Racing Toward a Red Light"	2:54
4.	"Second Guesses"	4:08
5.	"Count Back from TEN"	3:06
6.	"The Stutter Says a Lot"	2:53
7.	"Sore Distress"	3:59
8.	"The Secret Meaning of Freedom"	2:44
9.	"Old Friends"	4:14
10.	"Illusion & Control"	3:47
11.	"Control and the Urge to Pray"	4:16

Deluxe/Japanese Edition
No.	Title	Length
12.	"Drinking from the Fountain"	3:52
13.	"Along the Shadow of Man"	4:18

== Personnel ==
Saosin

- Anthony Green – lead vocals
- Beau Burchell – guitar, backing vocals
- Chris Sorenson – bass guitar, keyboards, backing vocals
- Alex Rodriguez – drums, percussion

Production

- Chris Sorenson – producer
- Beau Burchell – engineer, producer
- Will Yip – writer, engineer, vocal production

== Charts ==
Chart (2016)	Peak position
Australian Albums (ARIA)	44
US Billboard 200	45
