= Trash Talk (band) =

American hardcore punk band

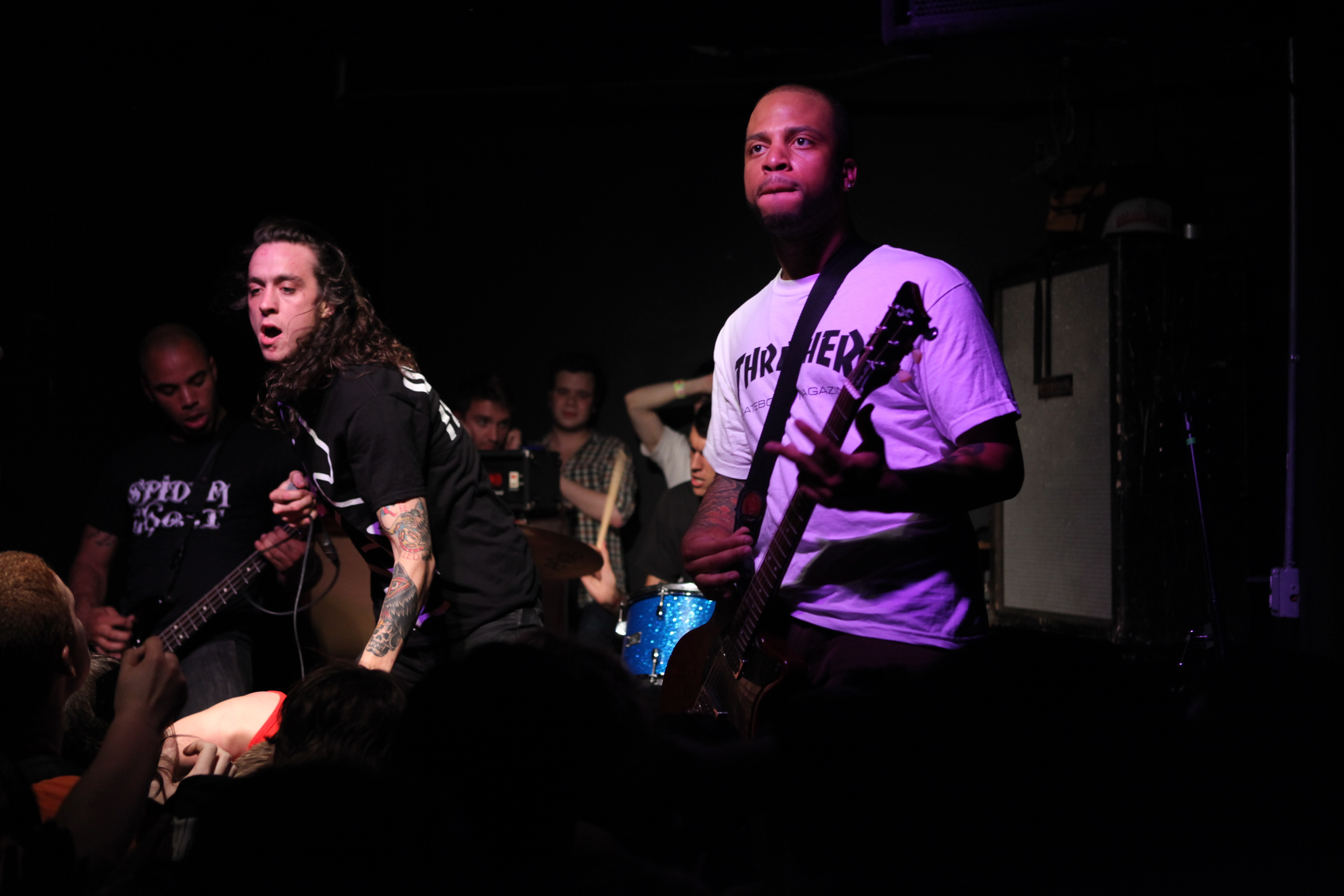
- Trash Talk in 2010

Background information
- Origin: Berkeley, California, U.S.
- Genres: Hardcore punk; thrashcore; crossover thrash
- Years active: 2005–present
- Labels: Trash Talk Collective; Odd Future; RED; TPS; Deathwish Inc./Malfunction; Six Feet Under; Reflections; Alliance Trax; Sell Our Souls
- Members: Spencer Pollard; Lee Spielman; Garrett Stevenson; David Gagliardi; Thomas Pridgen
- Past members: Tim Butcher; Sam Bosson; Nick Fit; John Fleuti; Scott Barrett; Devan Bentley

Trash Talk is an American hardcore punk band from Sacramento, California, formed in 2005. They have toured all around the world including Japan and Europe, as well as performed in many festivals in support of their releases which helped give the band recognition from publications including Rolling Stone.

== History ==
Formed in 2005, Trash Talk soon released a demo on Sell Our Souls Records, as well as a split with Bay Area band Steel Trap in 2006 for Spiderghost Pressgang. Later that year, they signed on to Rumble Records to record their debut album Walking Disease. Trash Talk would later sign to Malfunction Records (imprint of Deathwish Inc.) in 2007 for the release of their EP Plagues; which would later form a compilation with Walking Disease. After extensive touring with bands such as Cruel Hand, they would eventually leave Deathwish Inc. to manage their own label, Trash Talk Collective.

In 2008, Trash Talk traveled to Chicago with Steve Albini to work on their full-length album. 2009 saw the release of their single "East of Eden", featuring vocals from Keith Morris of Off!/Black Flag/Circle Jerks. In the United Kingdom, the band also later released "East of Eden" on Shame, a compilation album of various earlier albums, EPs, and singles, in the United Kingdom. Made up of two discs, it included Walking Disease, Plagues, and their eponymous 2008 album.

After the release of "East of Eden," Trash Talk kept a regular tour schedule and would go overseas. During their touring, Trash Talk participated in a live session for British radio station BBC Radio 1 showcasing songs from their latest album Eyes & Nines, released physically in Europe and digitally throughout on May 17, 2010. The album came out on CD in the United States on June 8, 2010, with the vinyl releasing on June 21, 2010. In October 2010, Trash Talk first appeared on the cover of The Fader, in its 70th issue. Trash Talk performed at the 2011 Soundwave Festival in February/March 2011. Trash Talk were added to the 2011 lineups of Download in June and Hevy Music Festival in August, although they withdrew prior to the performance.

A five-song EP entitled Awake was released October 11, 2011, on True Panther Sounds.

On May 30, 2012, it was announced that Trash Talk had signed to Odd Future Records, making them the first act not part of the Odd Future hip-hop collective and the first non hip-hop artist to sign to the label. The band has been known to perform Tyler, The Creator's song, "Radicals", with Tyler as a closer at a few Odd Future shows. They released their album 119 on Odd Future Records on October 9, 2012, in partnership with their Trash Talk Collective imprint and Sony BMG Music Group's RED Distribution.

Trash Talk's fourth studio album, No Peace, was released on May 27, 2014. On October 18, 2019, the band announced that they were putting the finishing touches on their upcoming album. On May 22, 2020, Trash Talk announced via social media their new EP, "Squalor," is coming out on June 5. Thomas Pridgen also announced he has rejoined the band to record the new EP.

== Members ==
Current

- Lee Spielman – lead vocals (2005–present)
- Spencer Pollard – bass, backing vocals (2005–present)
- Garrett Stevenson – guitars (2007–present)
- David Gagliardi – guitars (2014–present)
- Thomas Pridgen – drums (2014, 2019–present)

Past

- Tim Butcher – guitars (2005–2010, d. 2015)
- Sam Bosson – drums (2005–2014)
- Joey Castillo – drums (2016–2017)
- Devan Bentley – drums (2014)
- Joey Lopez – drums (2019; touring)

== Discography ==
=== Studio albums ===
- Walking Disease (Rumble Records / Six Feet Under Records, 2007)
- Trash Talk (Trash Talk Collective, 2008)
- Eyes & Nines (Trash Talk Collective, 2010)
- 119 (Trash Talk Collective / Odd Future Records, 2012)
- No Peace (Trash Talk Collective / Odd Future Records, 2014)

=== EPs ===
- Trash Talk 7" (Sell Our Souls, 2005)
- Split (with Steel Trap) (Spiderhost Pressgang, 2006)
- Plagues (Malfunction Records, 2008)
- East of Eden / Son of a Bitch (Trash Talk Collective, 2009)
- Split (with Wavves) (2011)
- Awake 7" (True Panther Sounds, 2011)
- Tangle (Trash Talk Collective, 2016)
- Squalor (with Kenny Beats) (Trash Talk Collective, 2020)

=== Demos ===
- 2005 Demo (Sell Our Souls, 2005)

=== Live albums ===
- Live at United Blood (Six Feet Under Records, 2008)

=== Compilations ===
- Plagues... Walking Disease (Deathwish Inc./Malfunction, 2008)
- Shame (Hassle Records, UK, 2009)

=== Music videos ===
- "Explode" (2010)
- "Awake" (2011)
- "Burn Alive" (2011)
- "Slander" (2012)
- "F.E.B.N." (2012)
- "The Hole" (2014)
- "The Great Escape" (2014)
