= Open Hand =

American rock band

- Origin: California, United States
- Genres: Post-hardcore; pop-punk; post-grunge; emo; alternative metal; indie rock; stoner rock
- Years active: 1997–present
- Label: Trustkill/Roadrunner/ Anodyne/Blacktop/American Propaganda
- Website: facebook.com/openhandrocks

Open Hand is an American rock band, first formed in Hollywood, California in 1997.

== History ==
Open Hand was formed in Hollywood, California between 1998 and 2000 by guitarist/vocalist Justin Isham, bassist Michael Anastasi, and drummer Alex Rodriguez, they released two EPs on Justin's own label, American Propaganda: Radio Days and Evolution that same year.

After touring and releasing their first EPs, the band signed with Trustkill Records in 2003. In 2003, Trustkill issued The Dream, a collection of the band's two EPs and bonus unreleased material. Anastasi left the band to focus on work between 2003 and 2005 and was replaced by Paul Malinowski. They went on to release the album "You and Me" in 2005 on Trustkill / Roadrunner Records. This period saw a plethora of lineup changes nearly spelling the end of the project: Malinowski left the band and Anastasi was brought back into the band with guitarist Sean Woods also joining up. Rodriquez left and was replaced with Paxton Pryor who had played with the band early in their formation as well. The band went on to tour extensively all over the world from 2005 to 2009. Open Hand released their next album, Honey, on Anodyne Records in 2010.

On April 20, 2020, the band released a remixed, remastered, and re-sequenced version of Honey for its 10th anniversary.

The album Weirdo was released on March 5, 2021.

== Band members ==
Current Members

- Justin Isham - lead vocals, guitar
- Ryan Castagna - guitar
- Ethan Novak - drums
- Erik Valentine - bass
- Kyle Hamood - keys

Former members - Live and Studio

- Gil Sharone - drums
- Breanne Martin (Breanne Wahl) - vocals, keyboards
- Alex Rodríguez - drums
- Sean Woods - guitar
- Alex Organ - drums
- Beau Burchell - guitar
- Michael Anastasi - bass
- Sean Rosenthal - bass
- Mike Longworth - bass
- Derek Donley - bass
- Paxton Pryor - drums
- Zach Kennedy - bass
- Jeff Meyer - bass
- Jason Gerken - drums
- Drew Marcogliese- drums
- Capt Dave Anderson - bass
- Dave Gaume - bass
- Sam Hoskins - drums
- Steve Riley - drums
- Paul Malinowski - bass
- Clark Gardner - drums

== Discography ==
=== Studio albums ===
- The Dream (Trustkill Records / Roadrunner Records, 2000)
- You and Me (Trustkill Records / Roadrunner Records, 2005)
- Honey (Anodyne Records, 2010)
- Weirdo (Blacktop Records, 2021)

=== Extended plays ===
- Radio Days (American Propaganda Records EP, 1998)
- Evolutions (American Propaganda Records EP, 1999)
- The Mark Of The Demon (Blacktop Records EP, 2011)

=== Live albums ===
- Live At CBGB (Magazine release, 2002; Blacktop Records reissue, 2015)
- Live at The Rainbow (Blacktop Records reissue, 2016)
