= Saosin =

American rock band

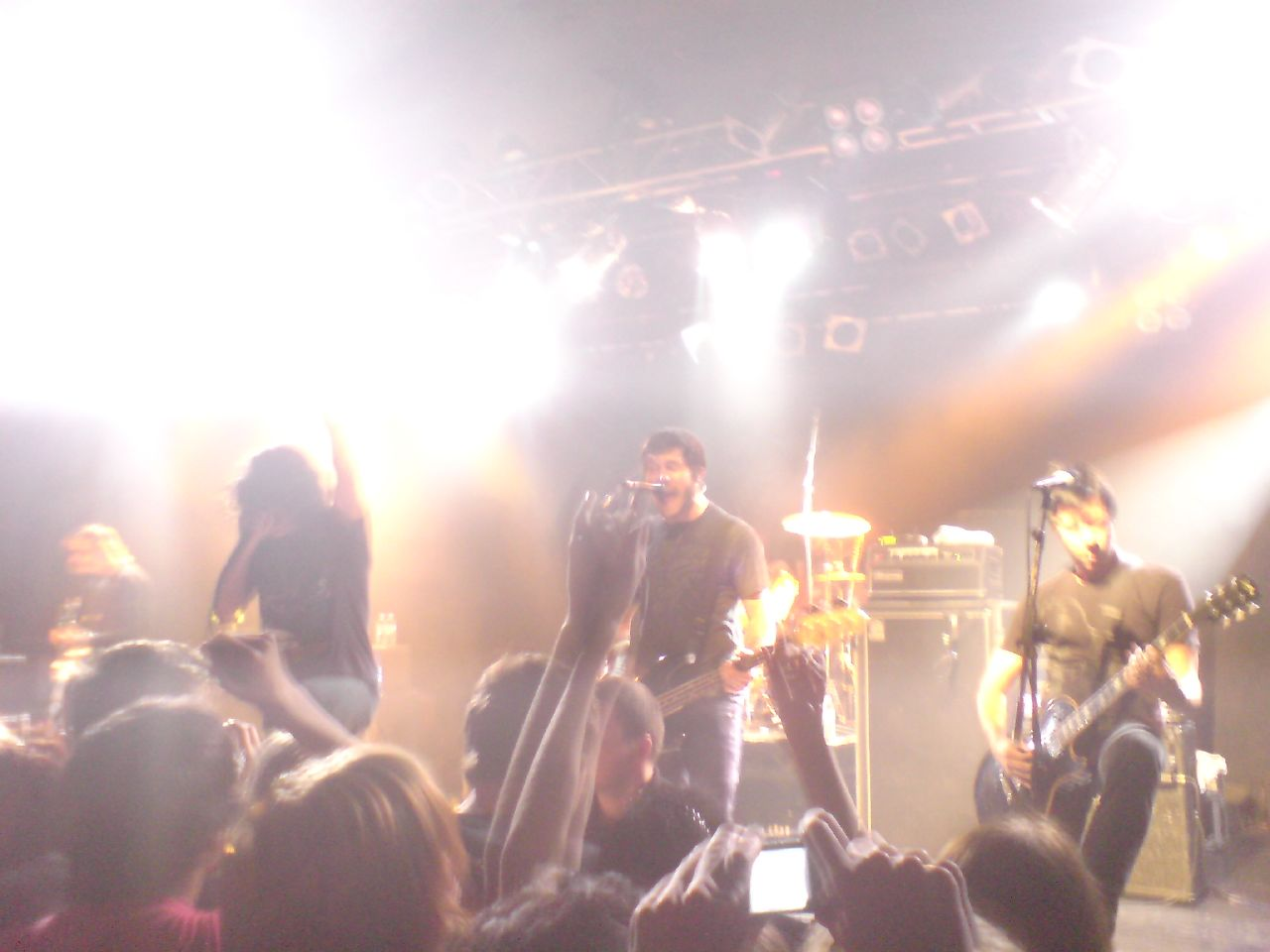
- Saosin performing in 2007

Background information
- Origin: Orange County, California, U.S.
- Genres: Post-hardcore; emo; alternative rock
- Years active: 2003–present
- Labels: Death Do Us Part; Epitaph; Capitol; Virgin; Sumerian
- Members: Alex Rodriguez; Beau Burchell; Chris Sorenson; Cove Reber; Phil Sgrosso
- Past members: Justin Shekoski; Zach Kennedy; Anthony Green
- Website: saosin.com

Saosin (/ˈseɪoʊsɪn/ or /ˈseɪoʊʃən/) is an American rock band formed in 2003 in Orange County, California. The group originally consisted of Beau Burchell, Justin Shekoski, Zach Kennedy and Anthony Green. They released their debut EP, Translating the Name, in 2003. The following year, Green departed from the band and Cove Reber joined as vocalist. The band released their self-titled debut album in 2006 under Capitol Records.

Their second studio album, In Search of Solid Ground (2009), released under Virgin Records, featured re-recorded tracks from their previous EP, The Grey EP. Reber left the band in 2010, prompting a hiatus. Saosin reunited in 2013 with all original members except Kennedy, and began touring again. In 2016, they released their third studio album, Along the Shadow, marking the return of Green to the lineup. The album was released through Epitaph Records.

Saosin's musical style is often associated with emo and post-hardcore music, and the band is known for their vocal harmonies and distinctive lead guitar techniques, such as delays and natural harmonics. Throughout several lineup changes, Burchell has been the band's only consistent band member since its inception.

== History ==
=== Formation and Translating the Name (2003–2004) ===
Beau Burchell originally started Saosin after leaving his former band, Open Hand. He began writing demos using early DAW software, eventually composing six or seven tracks by himself that would later be featured on Translating the Name. While Burchell initially performed the vocals, David Richardson—who sang on the "Lost Symphonies" demo—suggested that Anthony Green would be a better fit for the band. Richardson also recommended Justin Shekoski, the former guitarist for his band As Hope Dies. After listening to Saosin's early material and being contacted by Burchell, Shekoski agreed to join; Green followed suit, flying from his home to California to play with them. Burchell then reached out to Zach Kennedy and Alex Rodriguez, both of whom he had played with in Open Hand. However, Rodriguez was unable to join at the time due to touring obligations. The original lineup of Saosin—comprising Burchell, Shekoski, Kennedy, and Green—finally came together during the summer of 2003. Green lived with Kennedy and his parents until his eventual departure from the band. The band's name was initially proposed by Green. According to AllMusic, the name comes from the Chinese translation of "be careful" (xiǎoxīn). The phrase translates literally to "small heart". On June 18, 2023, during their 20th-anniversary show in Garden Grove, California, Chris revealed that Beau had initially proposed naming the band "The Gift". On June 17, the band unveiled their debut commercial production, the EP titled Translating the Name. This release met immediate success and gained significant popularity on various online forums and music websites.

Saosin initially gained recognition on the internet even before the release of their first full-length studio album. They became well-known on social networking platforms and music-sharing sites, most notably MySpace. It's estimated that the EP sold approximately 62,000 copies.

After the recording of the Translating the Name EP, bassist Zach Kennedy later opted to depart the band after their first show to pursue a career in art, leading to his replacement by Chris Sorenson. Additionally, Pat Magrath, who had previously served as a drum technician for Slayer, was hired to record drums for the EP. The drum compositions were largely crafted by Burchell. Alex Rodriguez, initially unable to participate in the EP recording due to prior commitments with the band Open Hand, was temporarily substituted by Danny King for live performances until Rodriguez could transition to a full-time role in Saosin after fulfilling his obligations with Open Hand. Following the release of "Translating the Name", Saosin embarked on a U.S. tour alongside fellow bands Boys Night Out and Anatomy of a Ghost.

In February 2004, the band faced a significant change when their vocalist, Anthony Green, departed from Saosin and later went on to form the band Circa Survive. Green, a native of Pennsylvania, cited homesickness, depression, and his desire to be closer to his family as factors contributing to his departure. He also expressed discontent with Saosin's creative direction and his exclusion from the songwriting process. To fulfill their remaining obligations for the Warped Tour, Story of the Year's Philip Sneed temporarily took over vocal duties. Subsequently, a public, nationwide audition was conducted to find a replacement for Green.

Translating the Name was recognized for pushing the boundaries of the post-hardcore genre and reshaping the music landscape. Alternative Press noted that with the release of this EP, Saosin made waves in the underground music scene, attracting considerable attention from record labels.

=== Introduction of Cove Reber and the Saosin EP (2004–2006) ===
After an exhaustive audition process and a brief period of using guest vocalists for demos, the band introduced a new lead singer, 19-year-old Cove Reber. Reber came into the fold after submitting an acoustic demo tape titled "Mookie's Last Christmas".

In an interview with Euphonia Online, Reber expressed his admiration for his new bandmates, saying, "Everyone I've played with wants to make music their lives. ... Saosin is a band on a completely different level. All these dudes are freaks about music."

Saosin embarked on their inaugural Taste of Chaos tour that winter, sharing stages with notable bands such as the Used, My Chemical Romance, Killswitch Engage, Senses Fail, and A Static Lullaby. In March, the band signed with Capitol Records and participated in the United States' Warped Tour once again. During that summer, they released the Saosin EP. Originally intended as a free sampler, Capitol Records opted to release it as an EP instead. The EP featured demo versions of songs that would later appear on their debut full-length album. A music video for their new single, "Bury Your Head", was filmed during this tour. Throughout 2005, the band continued to tour extensively, opening for acts such as Avenged Sevenfold and Coheed and Cambria.

=== Saosin LP and Come Close (2006–2008) ===
After a respite from touring between February and June, the Warped Tour 2006 and numerous demos and compilation appearances, Saosin released their first full-length album Saosin on September 26, 2006. The well-known music producer Howard Benson was hired for the production of the album. Benson had worked with several major rock bands such as My Chemical Romance and Blindside. The guitar riffs on the album were listed on Alternative Press's "Best Guitar Riffs of 2000s Rock". The first single, "Voices" was listed on the Top 46 post-hardcore songs of the 2000s, and the second single "You're Not Alone" was listed on the Top 10 Essential Emo Power Ballads by the Alternative Press.

During the rest of 2006, Saosin toured on the International Taste of Chaos Tour, playing their first shows outside of America. They also toured the United States with Bleeding Through and Senses Fail. They kept on touring for the whole year of 2007, beginning with a tour with Senses Fail, Alexisonfire, the Sleeping and Drop Dead, Gorgeous. Saosin also invited the non-profit organization Invisible Children for a portion of the tour. In February they joined the Taste of Chaos 2007 tour. Between April and June they toured in Europe, Australia, Japan and Indonesia.

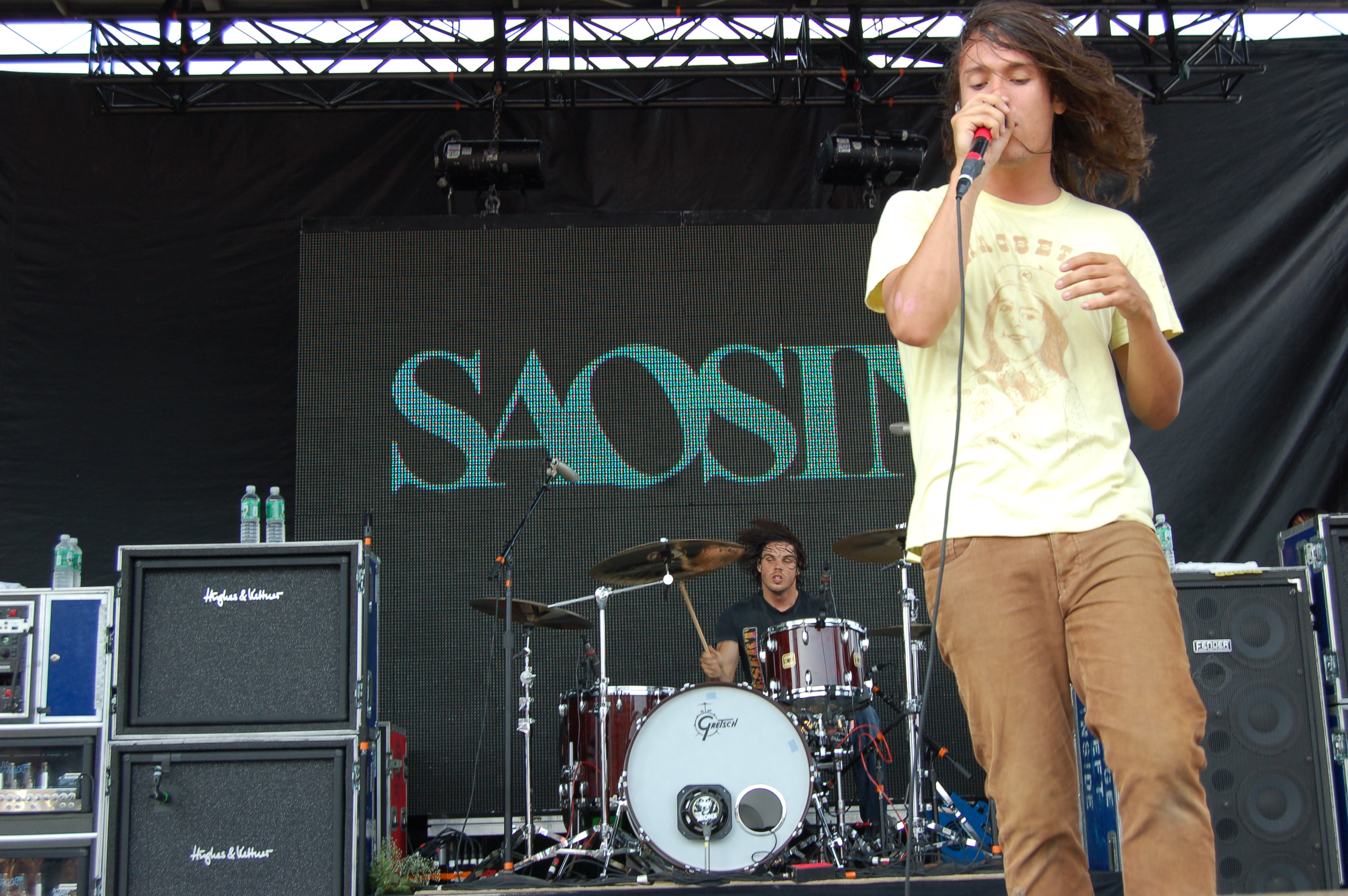
Saosin with Cove Reber, live on Projekt Revolution Tour, in 2007

When Saosin returned home they continued their headlining tour with Poison the Well, the Receiving End of Sirens, Fiore and Flight 409. In the later summer of 2007, they were part of Linkin Park's Projekt Revolution tour. After this, they headlined another tour in the US and Canada with Alexisonfire, Envy on the Coast, Norma Jean and the Dear and Departed. Concert footage was recorded during the tour stop on November 3, 2007, at The Theater of Living Arts in Philadelphia, Pennsylvania, which was later compiled for a live album and concert film entitled Come Close.

Saosin toured from January 26 to February 8, 2008, with Armor for Sleep, Meriwether, and the Bled; from February 9 to 16 Fear Before joined the tour. They went to Australia during February and March, after which they performed in Singapore on March 7 as the opening performance for Incubus on their Light Grenades Tour. On their way home they also visited Bali, Hawaii and Mexico. After two final shows at home in California in April, they took a nine-month break from touring.

=== The Grey EP and In Search of Solid Ground (2008–2010) ===
Saosin returned to touring in October 2008 alongside Underoath and the Devil Wears Prada.

In early 2009, they started recording a new album with producer Butch Walker. They partnered with Hurley to broadcast the recording process live on Hurley's website.

Saosin released a new EP titled The Grey EP on October 14, 2008. The EP was sold on tour and on iTunes and featured three new demos, as well as an acoustic version of "Come Close". The purpose of The Grey EP as to show demos they had been recording.

Saosin released In Search of Solid Ground on September 8, 2009. Two songs were released as a download to anyone who bought a shirt, and a digital pre-order. The songs were "On My Own" and "Is This Real". These two songs were released as singles on iTunes August 4, 2009. On August 5 a new song titled "Changing" was made available for streaming on the internet. The single was then put up for download on iTunes August 11.

In May 2010, the band confirmed on Twitter that their relationship with Virgin Records was over. A "DIY" direction was planned. In June, they and Blessthefall joined Story of the Year as the supporting acts on a tour of Australia.

=== The departure of Reber and period of inactivity (2010–2014) ===
On July 21, 2010, guitarist Beau Burchell delivered significant news to Saosin's fans, revealing that the band had decided to part ways with lead singer Cove Reber. This decision was prompted by concerns over Reber's declining stage performance and vocal abilities. In Burchell's words, "We didn't feel he could represent the music that we have recorded well on stage." Following his departure from Saosin, Reber became the lead vocalist for such bands as Patriot, Dead American and lé tired.

Amidst the uncertainty about Saosin's future, guitarist Beau Burchell shared updates on the band's progress in the studio, expressing enthusiasm for their forthcoming record. The departure of Reber left questions about the band's vocal direction and the search for his replacement. Reports surfaced that Charles Furney, lead singer of Secret and Whisper, might fill the vacant vocalist position. However, Saosin quickly denied these claims on their Facebook page, asserting that they had not yet found a new singer.

There were speculations that Tides of Man vocalist, Tilian Pearson, would audition for Saosin's vacant position. Pearson confirmed these rumors and acknowledged his interest in joining Saosin, which ultimately led to his departure from Tides of Man. However, Justin Shekoski clarified that although Pearson expressed a strong desire to join Saosin, the band had not met him in person yet.

During this period, a leaked demo fueled speculation about Pearson's involvement with Saosin. In an interview, Pearson clarified that the leaked demo was for a track that Saosin's bassist, Chris Sorenson, had been working on, and Pearson had provided vocals for it.

On December 16, 2012, Anthony Green joined Burchell and Shekoski on stage for the first time in nearly a decade, performing "Seven Years". In a later interview with Alternative Press, Green expressed openness to the idea of rejoining Saosin if the timing and circumstances were right while reflecting on the band's ten-year anniversary of the Translating the Name EP. On January 25, 2014, Beau Burchell provided further hints of Saosin's activities by tweeting a photo from Hurley Studios, indicating that he was tracking drums with Alex Rodriguez.

=== Anthony Green's return and Along the Shadow (2014–2023) ===
On May 17, 2014, Saosin performed at the Skate and Surf festival and embarked on a West Coast tour in early June 2014, reuniting with Green. During these shows, they unveiled two new songs and announced their progress in creating a new full-length album. During an interview with Alternative Press, the band hinted at the possibility of a future collaborations with Green.

In 2015, after 13 years of collaboration, Justin Shekoski and Saosin parted ways, with Shekoski subsequently becoming the lead guitarist for the Used. To fill the role of lead guitarist during the upcoming East Coast tour, Phil Sgrosso (former As I Lay Dying, Wovenwar) stepped in.

During their 2016 spring tour, Saosin announced their third album, Along the Shadow, would be released on May 20, 2016. Three singles along with music videos were released to support the album: "The Silver String" on March 16, 2016, "Racing Toward A Red Light" on April 6, 2016, and "Control and the Urge to Pray" on April 27, 2016.

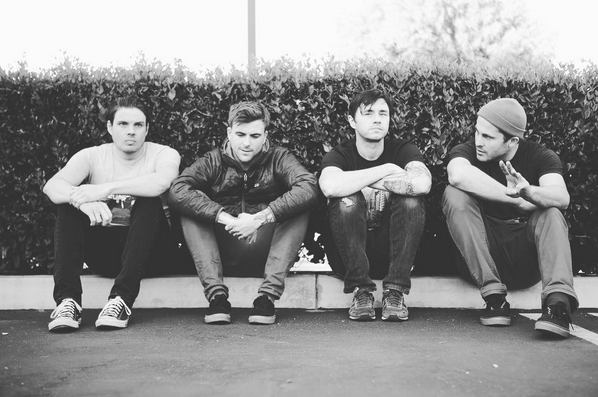
Saosin in 2016 with Anthony Green

On December 16 and 17, 2018, Saosin the band reunited with Reber for two shows. During these performances, they performed "Voices", "You're Not Alone", and a duet of "Seven Years" featuring both Reber and Green. It marked the first time in eight years that the band had performed on stage with Reber.

In 2020, Saosin released five singles. Among these releases were revamped versions of their early demos "I Can Tell There Was an Accident Here Earlier" and "Mookie's Last Christmas", as well as three more renditions of "Mookie's Last Christmas": two remixes by Monogram Sound and Jeremy SH Griffith, and an acoustic version.

On October 20, 2022, Saosin had Green and Reber sharing vocal duties during "Seven Years" and performed "Bury Your Head" and "You're Not Alone" as the encore of the concert at The Regency Ballroom, San Francisco.

On November 10, 2022, it was announced that Saosin would embark on their inaugural headlining tour of Australia in March 2023. This tour subsequently faced public scrutiny due to its promotion under the title "All the Hits, All the Albums", with the band exclusively performing songs that featured Green as the vocalist.

=== Live At The Garden Amphitheater, Reber's return and fourth album (2023–present) ===
On May 3, 2023, Saosin's 2006 single "You're Not Alone" received Gold certification from the RIAA. To commemorate the 20th anniversary of the band and their debut EP, Translating the Name, Saosin staged two shows in Garden Grove, CA, on June 17 and 18. These shows featured a special opening set with Reber returning as vocalist, alongside guest appearances by Donovan Melero and founding member, bassist Zach Kennedy. A live album titled Live At The Garden Amphitheater was released on July 19, 2024, via Born Losers Records.

On August 29, 2023, Saosin announced their second Asian tour would feature Reber taking over the vocal duties.

On February 25, 2024, guitarist Beau Burchell, using his official Discord server, revealed plans to have Reber feature on the band's fourth studio album. Burchell later noted on his Twitch channel that the band are in the process of re-recording the self-titled album for a vinyl release. The band was then announced on several festival line-ups for 2024, including When We Were Young, So What?!, Louder Than Life and Aftershock Festival. Saosin's promotional bio on both Louder Than Life and Aftershock's websites cited Reber's 2024 "triumphant comeback" as a fait accompli.

In March 2024, the band shared a new photo confirming both Reber and longtime touring guitarist Sgrosso as full-time members of the band. The caption of the post read "4.0", referring to both being the fourth major line-up change of the band as well as the line-up for the band's fourth studio album. This was confirmed in April when the band announced that they will release new music and a re-recording of their self-titled album, along with a US tour.

In early 2025, Saosin entered the studio to work on new material, sharing updates via their social media channels. In May 2025, the band launched a tour across Indonesia, performing in Bandung, Jakarta, Surabaya, and Solo. The first show took place on May 24, 2025, at Bikasoga Indoor Hall.

Saosin was also featured at several major festivals in 2025, including Welcome to Rockville, where they joined a lineup that included Underoath and Thursday. On June 15, 2025, the band performed at the Warped Tour 2025 in Washington, DC, with the whole live show recorded and released on the official Saosin YouTube channel. On July 27, 2025, Saosin also performed at the Vans Warped Tour in Long Beach, California.

On April 8, 2026, the band released a teaser on their Instagram page for a single from their upcoming album, which will be the third album to feature Reber as lead vocalist since his return to the band.

The band signed with Sumerian Records, and their single, titled "Starting Over Again", was released on April 14, 2026. The band began touring later that month across New Zealand, Australia, Southeast Asia, the United Kingdom, Mexico, and the United States.

On May 5, 2026 the band's 2006 self-titled was officially certified gold by RIAA with over 500,000 records sold.

== Musical style ==
Saosin has been described as post-hardcore, emo, indie rock, alternative rock, screamo, and heavy metal. Kerrang! categorized them as a "MySpace band", albeit "a more mature and experimental" example of the bands associated with this classification. Their sound has drawn comparisons to Chiodos, Senses Fail and Silverstein. Corey Apar of AllMusic described the band's sound as "powerful," and according to him, the band's name is derived from a Chinese phrase that literally translates to "small heart," which he says is "used to convey caution or a warning."

== Legacy ==
According to Corey Apar of AllMusic, "Saosin were one of the formative bands on the post-hardcore scene, and one of the first to embrace social media as a way of promoting themselves."

== Band members ==
Current members

- Beau Burchell – rhythm guitar, programming, piano, keyboards, backing vocals (2003–present); lead guitar (2003, 2015–2024; in-studio only); lead vocals (2003; on demos only)
- Chris Sorenson – bass, piano, keyboards, backing vocals (2003–present)
- Alex Rodriguez – drums (2004–present)
- Cove Reber – lead vocals, piano, keyboards, auxiliary percussion (2004–2010, 2024–present; touring 2023)
- Phil Sgrosso – lead guitar (2024–present; touring 2016–2024)

Former members

- Justin Shekoski – lead guitar, backing vocals (2003–2015)
- Zach Kennedy – bass (2003; one-off shows 2023, 2024)
- Anthony Green – lead vocals (2003–2004, 2014–2023; one-off show 2012)

Former touring musicians

- Danny King – drums (2003)
- Philip Sneed – lead vocals (2004)
- Ken Floyd – guitars (2010)

Former session musicians

- Pat Magrath – drums (2003, on Translating the Name)
- David Richardson – unclean vocals (2003, on demos only)
- Tilian Pearson – lead vocals (2011, on demos)
- Alex Lawrence – drums (2003–2004)

== Discography ==
Studio albums

- Saosin (2006)
- In Search of Solid Ground (2009)
- Along the Shadow (2016)
