= Senses Fail discography =

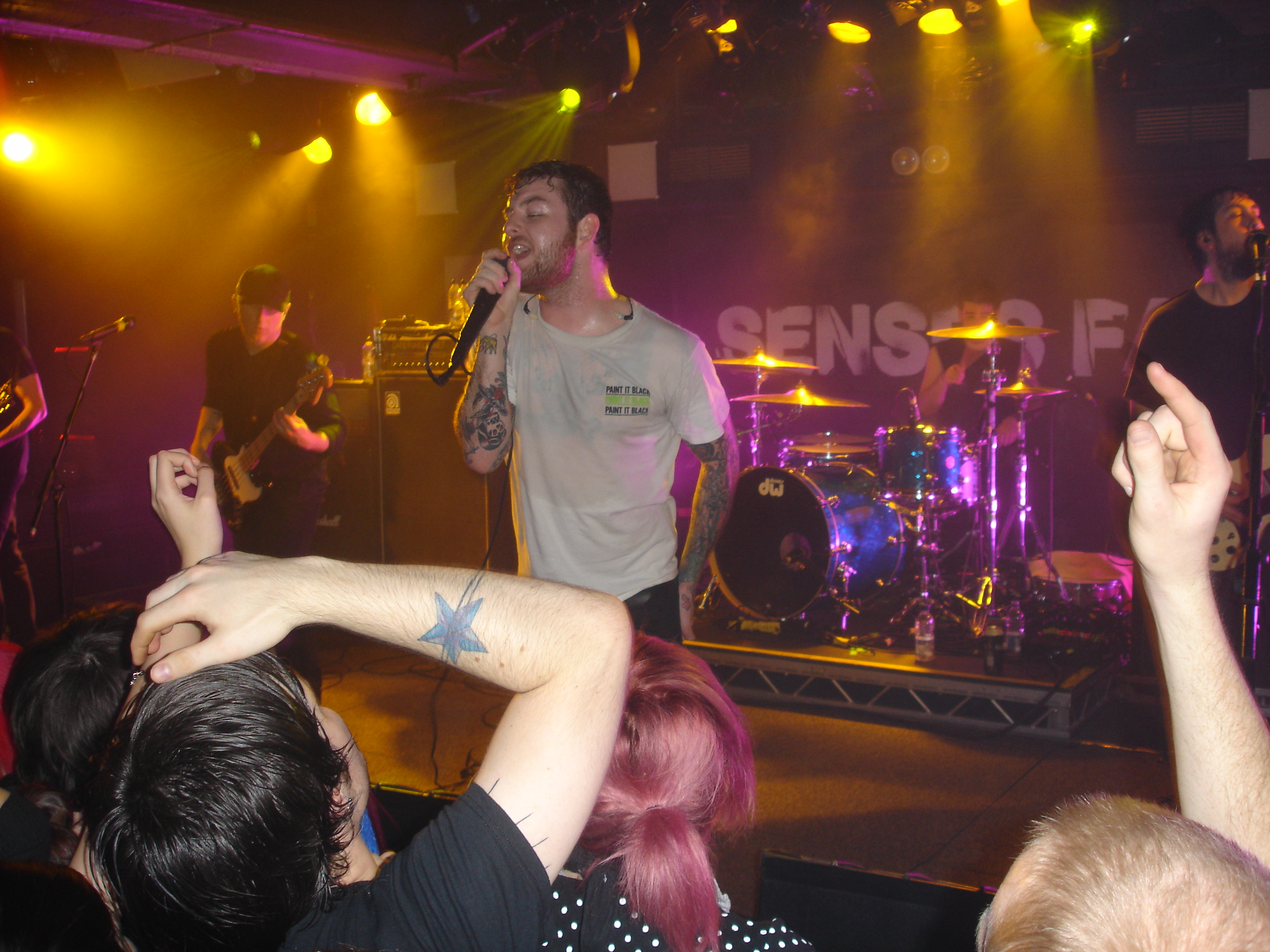
- Studio albums: 8
- EPs: 3
- Live albums: 1
- Compilation albums: 1
- Singles: 14
- Music videos: 20

The discography of Senses Fail, an American rock band, consists of eight studio albums, one compilation album, one live album, three extended plays and 14 singles.

== Albums ==
=== Studio albums ===
List of studio albums
Title	Details	Peak chart positions			Certifications
Title	Details	US	US Indie	UK	Certifications
Let It Enfold You	Released: September 7, 2004; Label: Vagrant; Format: CD, CD+DVD-V, DL, LP	34	2	—	RIAA: Gold
Still Searching	Released: October 10, 2006; Label: Vagrant; Format: CD, CD+DVD-V, DL, LP	15	2	150	
Life Is Not a Waiting Room	Released: October 7, 2008; Label: Vagrant; Format: CD, DL, LP	18	1	—	
The Fire	Released: October 26, 2010; Label: Vagrant; Format: CD, CD+DVD-V, DL, LP	32	2	—	
Renacer	Released: March 26, 2013; Label: Staple; Format: CD, DL, LP	84	15	—	
Pull the Thorns from Your Heart	Released: June 30, 2015; Label: Pure Noise; Format: CD, CS, DL, LP	109	—	—	
If There Is Light, It Will Find You	Released: February 16, 2018; Label: Pure Noise; Format: CD, DL, LP	57	1	—	
Hell Is in Your Head	Released: July 15, 2022; Label: Pure Noise; Format: CD, DL, LP	—	—	—	
"—" denotes a release that did not chart.

=== Compilation albums ===
List of compilation albums
Title	Details
Follow Your Bliss: The Best of Senses Fail	Released: June 19, 2012; Label: Vagrant; Format: CD, DL

=== Live albums ===
List of live albums
Title	Details
Joshua Tree (Live)	Released: October 22, 2021; Label: Self-released; Format: LP, DL

== Extended plays ==
List of extended plays
Title	Details	Peak chart positions	
Title	Details	US	US Indie
From the Depths of Dreams	Released: August 13, 2002; Label: ECA; Format: CD, DL, 12" vinyl	144	2
Senses Fail / Man Overboard (split with Man Overboard)	Released: March 3, 2015; Label: Pure Noise, Rise; Format: DL, 7" vinyl	—	—
In Your Absence	Released: March 3, 2017; Label: Pure Noise; Format: CD, DL, 12" vinyl	171	10
"—" denotes a release that did not chart.

== Singles ==
Title	Year	Album	Certifications
"Buried a Lie"	2005	Let It Enfold You	
"Rum Is for Drinking, Not for Burning"	2005	Let It Enfold You	
"Calling All Cars"	2006	Still Searching	RIAA: Gold
"Can't Be Saved"	2007	Still Searching	RIAA: Gold
"Family Tradition"	2008	Life Is Not a Waiting Room	
"Mi Amor"	2013	Renacer	
"The Importance of the Moment of Death"	2015	Pull the Thorns from Your Heart	
"Lost and Found"	2016	In Your Absence	
"Jets to Peru"	2017	In Your Absence	
"Double Cross"	2017	If There Is Light, It Will Find You	
"Gold Jacket, Green Jacket..."	2018	If There Is Light, It Will Find You	
"Death by Water (feat. Spencer Charnas)"	2021	Hell Is in Your Head	
"I’m Sorry I’m Leaving"	2021	Hell Is in Your Head	
"End of the World"	2022	Hell Is in Your Head	

== Other appearances ==
Title	Year	Album
"Bad Reputation" (Joan Jett cover)	2005	Bad News Bears soundtrack
"Institutionalized" (Suicidal Tendencies cover)	2005	Tony Hawk's American Wasteland
"Bite to Break Skin" (Legion of Doom remix)	2006	Underworld: Evolution: Original Motion Picture Soundtrack
"The Past Is Proof"	2008	Punisher: War Zone Original Motion Picture Soundtrack
"AM:PM" (American Nightmare cover)	2014	The Big Comp II
M1SERY_SYNDROME (featured artist for nothing,nowhere.)	2023	Void Eternal

== Music videos ==
Title	Year	Director	Album
"Bloody Romance"	2003	Lisa Brown	From the Depths of Dreams
"One Eight Seven" (live)	2003	Lisa Brown	From the Depths of Dreams
"Buried a Lie"	2004	Lisa Brown	Let It Enfold You
"Rum Is for Drinking, Not for Burning"	2005	Christopher Mills	Let It Enfold You
"Calling All Cars"	2006	Jay Martin	Still Searching
"Can't Be Saved"	2007	Matt Bass	Still Searching
"The Priest and the Matador"	2007	Daryl Goldberg	Still Searching
"Family Tradition"	2008	Zach Merck	Life Is Not a Waiting Room
"Life Boats" (live)	2010	Lisa Brown	The Fire
"New Year's Eve"	2011	Lisa Brown	The Fire
"The Fire"	2011	Richard Borge	The Fire
"Mi Amor"	2013	Behn Fannin	Renacer
"Between the Mountains and the Sea"	2013	Markus Lundqvist	Renacer
"The Importance of the Moment of Death"	2015	Max Moore	Pull the Thorns from Your Heart
"Jets to Peru"	2017	Michael Higgs & Marlon Brandope	In Your Absence
"Gold Jacket, Green Jacket..."	2018		If There Is Light, It Will Find You
"Elevator to the Gallows"	2019	John Mark	If There Is Light, It Will Find You
"Bastard Son"	2019	John Mark	From the Depths of Dreams (Re-Imagined)
"I'm Sorry I'm Leaving"	2021	Dylan Hryciuk	Hell Is in Your Head
"End of the World / A Game of Chess" Ft. Connie Sgarbossa	2022	Cameron Nunez	Hell Is in Your Head
