= In Your Absence =

EP by Senses Fail
- Released: March 3, 2017
- Genre: Acoustic
- Length: 19:01
- Label: Pure Noise
- Producer: Beau Burchell, Kyle Black

Senses Fail chronology
Pull the Thorns from Your Heart (2015)	In Your Absence (2017)	If There Is Light, It Will Find You (2018)

Singles from In Your Absence
- 1. "Lost and Found" Released: November 26, 2016; 2. "Jets to Perú" Released: January 26, 2017

In Your Absence is an EP by Senses Fail. It was released on March 3, 2017, on Pure Noise Records.

It features 3 brand new songs recorded and produced by Beau Burchell, alongside acoustic renditions of "Lost and Found" from Still Searching, and "Family Tradition" from Life Is Not a Waiting Room recorded and produced by Kyle Black. A music video was released for the single, "Jets to Perú", on January 26, 2017.

== Track listing ==
No.	Title	Writer(s)	Length
1.	"Jets to Perú"	Buddy Nielsen; Beau Burchell; Gavin Caswell	3:52
2.	"In Your Absence"	Nielsen; Burchell; Caswell	3:20
3.	"Death Bed"	Nielsen; Burchell; Caswell	4:32
4.	"Family Tradition"	Nielsen; Jason Black; Brian McTernan; Heath Saraceno; Dan Trapp; Garret Zablocki	3:26
5.	"Lost and Found"	Nielsen; Mike Glita; Saraceno; Trapp; Zablocki	3:51
Total length:			19:01

== Chart performance ==
Chart (2017)	Peak position
US Billboard 200	171
US Top Album Sales (Billboard)	43
US Top Alternative Albums (Billboard)	19
US Independent Albums (Billboard)	10
US Top Rock Albums (Billboard)	33
US Vinyl Albums (Billboard)	6
US Indie Store Album Sales (Billboard)	12
