= Follow Your Bliss: The Best of Senses Fail =

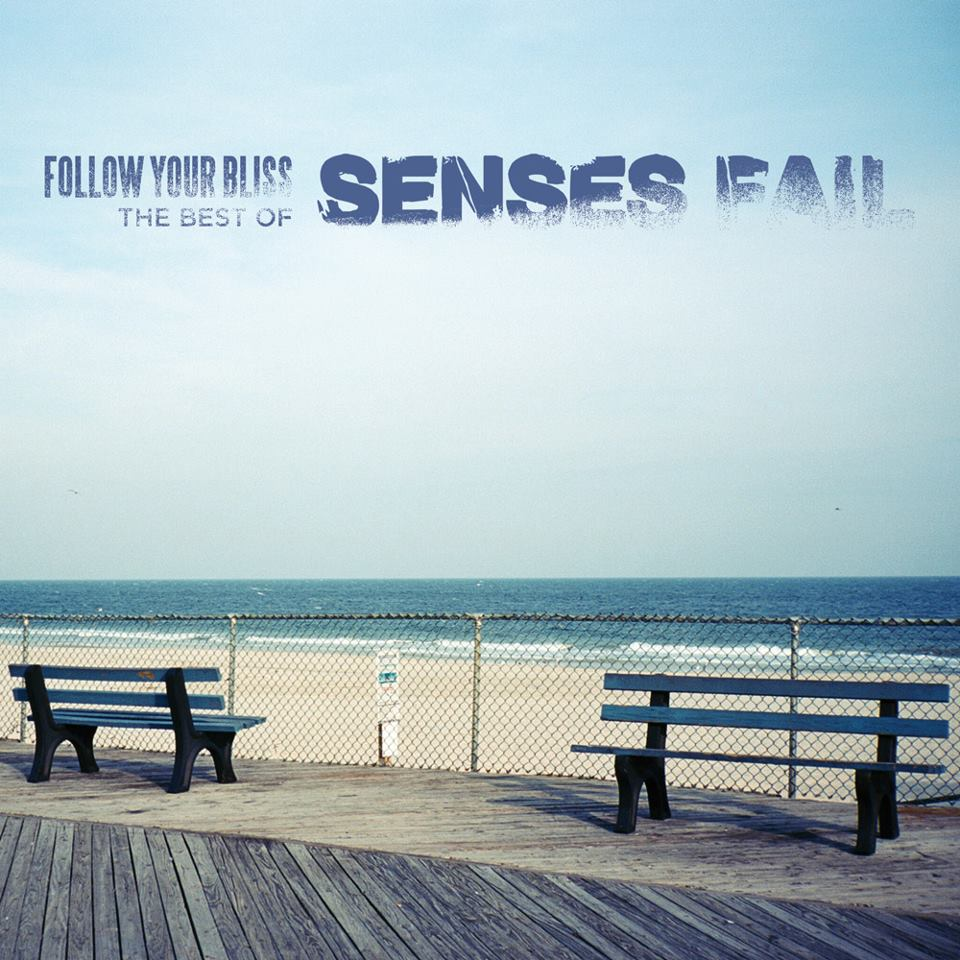

Compilation album by Senses Fail
- Released: June 19, 2012
- Recorded: 2002–2012
- Genre: Emo; post-hardcore
- Length: 67:54
- Label: Vagrant

Senses Fail chronology
The Fire (2010)	Follow Your Bliss: The Best of Senses Fail (2012)	Renacer (2013)

Professional ratings
Review scores
Source	Rating
The Aquarian Weekly	Favorable
PopMatters	6/10 stars

Follow Your Bliss: The Best of Senses Fail is a compilation album from the American post-hardcore band Senses Fail, released on June 19, 2012, through Vagrant Records. The album consists of the band's well-known songs and singles from their previous releases From the Depths of Dreams, Let It Enfold You, Still Searching, Life Is Not a Waiting Room, and The Fire. The album also includes four new songs on the second disc.

== Promotion ==
Senses Fail uploaded several videos to their YouTube channel, like "War Paint" (from the EP), and reposted videos like "The Priest and the Matador." The band has made several announcements on their Facebook page. Senses Fail has also allowed AbsolutePunk.net to review the EP, and the site said: "The urgency flowing through 'Early Graves' showcases the band at its best, especially Nielsen, who has really come into his own as a vocalist." AbsolutePunk.net gave the EP a 75% (7.5 out of 10) rating.

== Track listing ==
Disc 1

1. "Wolves At The Door" - 3:28
2. "Can't Be Saved" - 3:08
3. "Lungs Like Gallows" - 3:08
4. "Buried A Lie" - 3:22
5. "Shark Attack" - 2:54
6. "Lady In A Blue Dress" - 3:19
7. "The Fire" - 3:44
8. "Rum Is for Drinking, Not for Burning" - 2:43
9. "Calling All Cars" - 3:24
10. "Bite To Break Skin" 3:33
11. "The Priest And The Matador" - 4:19
12. "Bloody Romance" - 3:49
13. "Family Tradition" - 3:34
14. "You're Cute When You Scream" - 2:26
15. "New Year's Eve" - 3:15
16. "One Eight Seven" - 4:12

Disc 2

1. "War Paint" - 3:39
2. "Vines" - 3:36
3. "Early Graves" - 3:16
4. "Waves" - 3:19
- Tracks 12 and 16 are from the 2002 EP From the Depths of Dreams
  - These are exchanged for "Lifeboats" and "Garden State" respectively on the Japanese release
- Tracks 4, 6, 8, 10, and 14 are from the 2004 album Let It Enfold You
- Tracks 2, 5, 9, and 11 are from the 2006 album Still Searching
- Tracks 1, 3, and 13 are from the 2008 album Life Is Not a Waiting Room
- Tracks 7 and 15 are from 2010 album The Fire

== Personnel ==
- Buddy Nielsen - lead vocals
- Garrett Zablocki - guitar, backing vocals (Disc 1)
- Matt Smith - guitar (Disc 2)
- Dave Miller - guitar (Disc 1;tracks 4, 6, 8, 10, 12, 14, 16)
- Heath Saraceno - guitar, vocals (Disc 1; tracks 1–3, 5, 9, 11, 13)
- Zach Roach - guitar (Disc 2)
- Mike Glita - bass, backing vocals (Disc 1;tracks 2, 4, 5, 6, 8–12, 14, 16)
- Jason Black - bass (Disc 1;tracks 1, 3, 7, 13, 15; Disc 2)
- Dan Trapp - drums
