= More Songs ... Acoustic =

Acoustic LP

Studio album by Christians & Lions
- Released: June 6, 2006 (US)
- Genre: Indie rock, folk
- Length: 33:50
- Label: ECA Records (US); Floating Garbage Continent

Christians & Lions chronology
Acoustic LP (2006)	More Songs for Dreamsleepers and the Very Awake (2006)

Professional ratings
Review scores
Source	Rating
The Boston Phoenix	5/5 stars
ECA Records	5/5 stars

Acoustic LP is a limited-run, tour-only album by Christians & Lions. It was recorded by Djim Reynolds at The Estate in Leominster, Massachusetts. Art by Conor Morey-Barret. Photos by Athena Moore. Mastered by Justin Shrutz & Jason Finkel at Sterling Sound in NYC. Thanks to Dave Conway.

It was available to download for free on the band's website for a suggested donation.

== Track listing ==
1. Free Radio Post-Apocalyptic Metropolis Blues
2. Stay Warm
3. Landing
4. A Root’s Grave Is Above Ground
5. Longboy
6. Bodega
7. Tender Sparks (October and Over)
8. Some Trees
9. Sexton Under Glass
10. Firebelly Salamander
11. Bones
12. Skinny Fists

== Personnel ==
- Ben Potrykus – vocals, guitar, singing saw.
- Sam Potrykus – bass, vocals.
- Matt Sisto – guitar, organ, piano.
- Chris Mara – drums, aux percussion.
- Chris Barrett – trumpet.
