= More Songs for Dreamsleepers and the Very Awake =

Studio album by Christians & Lions
- Released: November 7, 2006 (US)
- Recorded: Basement 247, Allston, Massachusetts
- Genre: Indie rock, folk
- Length: 30:31
- Label: ECA Records (US); Floating Garbage Continent
- Producer: Jack Younger

Christians & Lions chronology
| Acoustic LP (2006) | More Songs for Dreamsleepers and the Very Awake (2006) | Gimmie Diction Single (2007) |

Professional ratings
Review scores
| Source | Rating |
|---|---|
| The Boston Phoenix | 5/5 stars |
| Absolute Punk | (94%) |
| Stylus Magazine | (B−) |

More Songs for Dreamsleepers and The Very Awake is a studio album by Christians & Lions. It was recorded by Jack Younger at Basement 247 in Allston, Massachusetts. Mastered by Nick Zampiello at New Alliance East in Boston, Massachusetts. Art by Michael Washburn. Design by Matt Sisto. Originally released on ECA Records, thanks to Dave Conway.

It is available to download for free on the band's website for a suggested donation.

== Track listing ==
1. "Longboy"
2. "Stay Warm"
3. "Bones"
4. "Sexton Under Glass"
5. "Gimme Diction"
6. "A Root’s Grave is Above Ground"
7. "Skinny Fists"
8. "Tender Sparks (October and Over)"
9. "Some Trees"
10. "Landing"

== Personnel ==
- Ben Potrykus - vocals, guitar, singing saw.
- Sam Potrykus - bass, vocals.
- Matt Sisto - guitar, organ, piano.
- Chris Mara - drums, aux percussion.
- Chris Barrett - trumpet.
