= Salvation (The Cranberries song) =

1996 single by the Cranberries

Single by the Cranberries

from the album To the Faithful Departed
- B-side: "I'm Still Remembering"; "I Just Shot John Lennon" (live)
- Released: 8 April 1996
- Studio: Windmill Lane (Dublin, Ireland)
- Genre: Punk rock
- Length: 2:24
- Label: Island
- Songwriters: Dolores O'Riordan; Noel Hogan
- Producers: Bruce Fairbairn; the Cranberries

The Cranberries singles chronology
"Ridiculous Thoughts" (1995)	"Salvation" (1996)	"Free to Decide" (1996)

Audio sample
- Cranberries - "Salvation": file; help

"Salvation" is the lead single from Irish rock band the Cranberries' third studio album, To the Faithful Departed (1996). Released on 8 April 1996 by Island Records, the single reached number one on the US Billboard Modern Rock Tracks chart for four weeks and was a chart hit in Europe and Australia, peaking at number four in Iceland, number six in Italy, number seven in New Zealand, and number eight in Australia and Ireland. The music video for the song was directed by Olivier Dahan and filmed in France.

== Content ==
"Salvation" talks about drug abuse, and how one should refrain from falling into it. The directness of the song was regarded as bland and too preachy by the media and critics, but Dolores O'Riordan said that it wasn't supposed to be an anti-drug song per se, but "kind of anti the idea of becoming totally controlled by anything, any substance at all", O'Riordan stated to Kurt Loder—adding that she knew what it was like and that "it wasn't a nice experience and it didn't get me anywhere. It just confused me more". She explained that the meaning behind the song was "reality [being] reality, and unfortunately, no how much you go away, you come back, and it's always here".

== Critical response ==
Professional ratings
Review scores
Source	Rating
Smash Hits	1/5 stars

Daina Darzin from Cash Box named "Salvation" Pick of the Week, viewing it as "a really big edgy, completely memorable sound that just begs to be on the radio." She added, "A clever, ironic look at drug culture from both a kid's and parents' viewpoint, the track is propelled by Dolores O'Riordan's strong, evocative voice, a wailing horn section, and monster drums. Dark and driving with a nearly perfect pop sensibility, "Salvation" should find a happy home at both alternative and heavy music stations." Dan Caffrey of Consequence of Sound noted that the song "features an abrasive horn section and punk rock aesthetic that fit in quite nicely with the remainder of the video, which makes you forget about front-woman Dolores O'Riordan's overreaching words pretty quickly".

Roisin O'Connor of The Independent described it as a "fast-tempo track that served as a scathing condemnation of growing drug abuse in Ireland was taken from the band's 1996 album To the Faithful Departed, around the same time as ecstasy use reached alarming new heights. Kevin Courtney from Irish Times felt it's "less irritating" than "Zombie", "but also less substantial, sounding like secondhand Siouxsie and the Banshees or The Breeders, but it still manages to leave a bit of a sting before abruptly vaporising in an explosion of drums. - Stephen Street's lush, layered production is replaced by a hard, edgy directness, suggesting that Dolores and the boys, have finally found - the confidence to leap fearlessly into the healing flames." A reviewer from Music Week gave the song three out of five, adding that "this is more upbeat than previous offerings. The fans will lap it up."

== Music video ==
The accompanying music video for "Salvation" was directed in March 1996 by Olivier Dahan in France, for the company Bandits Productions.

The video was the last video for the band to gain heavy rotation on MTV, as later singles failed to gain traction on the network. The video featured a crazed clown (a hybrid of horror monsters Freddy Krueger, Pennywise, and Pinhead) floating around a castle and its surroundings and driving a group of young girls around in a car, implied to be in the thralls of drug addiction. The video cuts between images of Dolores O'Riordan singing the song and a pair of adults, who alternate between trying to wake a comatose daughter from her slumber, and the evil clown tying up and terrorizing the couple (who are now in latex catsuits) with the now awake daughter kissing the clown.

"Salvation" was nominated for the MTV Video Music Award for Best Art Direction, held at Radio City Music Hall in New York City, NY, 4 September 1996.

== Track listings ==
- UK, Australasian, and Japanese CD single
1. "Salvation"
2. "I'm Still Remembering" (album version)
3. "I Just Shot John Lennon" (live version)

Note: "I Just Shot John Lennon" was recorded live at The Point, Dublin, on 2 June 1995 for Radio Telefis Eireann. A limited-edition version of this format packaged in a box was also released.

- UK cassette single and European CD single
1. "Salvation"
2. "I'm Still Remembering" (album version)

== Charts ==
=== Weekly charts ===
Weekly chart performance for "Salvation"
Chart (1996)	Peak position
Australia (ARIA)	8
Austria (Ö3 Austria Top 40)	27
Belgium (Ultratop 50 Flanders)	32
Belgium (Ultratop 50 Wallonia)	18
Canada Top Singles (RPM)	30
Canada Rock/Alternative (RPM)	2
Europe (Eurochart Hot 100)	20
Finland (Suomen virallinen lista)	15
France (SNEP)	13
Germany (GfK)	44
Iceland (Íslenski Listinn Topp 40)	4
Ireland (IRMA)	8
Israel (Israeli Singles Chart)	14
Italy (Musica e dischi)	6
Italy Airplay (Music & Media)	4
Netherlands (Dutch Top 40)	39
Netherlands (Single Top 100)	36
New Zealand (Recorded Music NZ)	7
Scottish Singles Sales (Official Charts)	12
Sweden (Sverigetopplistan)	33
Switzerland (Schweizer Hitparade)	35
UK Singles (Official Charts)	13
US Radio Songs (Billboard)	21
US Alternative Airplay (Billboard)	1
US Mainstream Rock Airplay (Billboard)	25
US Pop Airplay (Billboard)	33

=== Year-end charts ===
Year-end chart performance for "Salvation"
Chart (1996)	Position
Australia (ARIA)	79
Belgium (Ultratop 50 Wallonia)	74
Canada Rock/Alternative (RPM)	43
Iceland (Íslenski Listinn Topp 40)	40
US Modern Rock Tracks (Billboard)	29

== Certifications ==
Certifications and sales for "Salvation"
Region	Certification	Certified units/sales
New Zealand (RMNZ)	Gold	5,000^{*}
^{*} Sales figures based on certification alone.

== Release history ==
Release dates and formats for "Salvation"
Region	Date	Format(s)	Label(s)	Ref.
United Kingdom	8 April 1996	CD; cassette	Island	
United States	16 April 1996	Contemporary hit radio	Island	
Japan	19 April 1996	CD	Island	

== Cover versions ==
Earthsuit, a Christian rock group, performed a live cover of this song during their last few tours. Prayer for Cleansing, a vegan straight edge metalcore group, covered the song on their EP The Tragedy released in 2004. Senses Fail, an emo post-hardcore group, covered this song as a bonus track on their 2006 album Still Searching. Ursula, a hardcore crust punk group from California, covered the song on their 2019 second 4-track EP Regurgitate.
