= Christians & Lions =

American band

- Origin: Jamaica Plain, Boston, Massachusetts, United States
- Genres: Indie rock, folk, DIY
- Years active: 2004–present
- Labels: Floating Garbage Continent (2008–present); ECA Records (2004–2006)
- Members: Ben Potrykus; Chris Mara; Greg Tellier; Jonathan Hansard; Kate Potrykus
- Past members: Sam Potrykus; Matt Sisto; Chris Barret

Christians & Lions is a band based out of Jamaica Plain and has been a notable part of the Boston DIY scene.

They released one record, More Songs for Dreamsleepers and the Very Awake, on ECA Records in 2005. They are currently on their self-operated label, Floating Garbage Continent and released an EP called Bird's Milk in 2009.

All of the band's music is available to download for free on the band's website for a suggested donation.

== History ==
Brothers Ben and Sam Potrykus played music together since junior high school. Together with a group of other friends they formed Sharp Teeth. In addition to guitar, the band featured upright bass, mandolin and a trash can and tambourine for percussion. In 2004, Christians and Lions formed in a stripped down version of Sharp Teeth, with Ben and Sam as the only members.

Friends and former roommates, guitarist Matt Sisto and drummer Chris Mara joined the band in 2006. On tour, the band distributed their Acoustic LP which featured acoustic versions of all the songs from More Songs. It includes an up-tempo version of "Sexton Under Glass" and an otherwise unreleased track "Firebelly Salamander."

In 2006, the band released More Songs for Dreamsleepers and the Very Awake. It was recorded at Basement 247 in Allston, MA. It garnered favorable reviews, being called "smart and textured indie-folk" by the Boston Phoenix and "somehow comfortable, yet unsettling...like a Cadillac someone died in" by engineer Jack Younger. The lyrics are philosophical, having been inspired by theorists like Hélène Cixous, Louis Althusser and Marshall McLuhan. It is the musical equivalent of a warm fire on a cold winter night. An album full of memorable melodies and lavish instrumentation, including brass, organ, and singing saw.

In 2007 the band released the Gimmie Diction Single, which featured two unreleased tracks "Free Radio Post Apocalyptic Metropolis Blues" and "Asa Nisi Masa."

Towards the end of 2007, the band's live shows incorporated more effects and digital elements. However, the band broke up in order for its members to pursue other projects. Ben went on to continue experimenting with tape effects in the band BAXIA. Sam went on to form The Needy Visions with friend and DIY promoter Dan Shea.

In 2008 the band reunited and started their own label, Floating Garbage Continent.

In 2009, Sam left the band to pursue other projects including Peace, Loving, a band on The Whitehaus Family Record.

Christians & Lions started touring again and released an EP called Bird's Milk.

The band retains a close friendship with The Whitehaus Family Record, which has organized shows featuring Christians & Lions and label artists such as Gracious Calamity and The Woodrow Wilsons. In 2019, Christians & Lions released Young Familiar on their Floating Garbage Continent label. In August 2021 it was announced that the track "The Keeper" will appear on the CW program The Republic of Sarah.

== Discography ==
- Acoustic (2006)
- More Songs for Dreamsleepers and the Very Awake (2006)
- Gimmie Diction Single (2007)
- Bird's Milk EP (2009)
- Young Familiar (2019)
