= The Whitehaus Family Record =

Coordinates: 42.312°N 71.114°W

- Founded: 2006
- Founder: The Treemausers
- Genre: Indie rock, folk, psychedelic, electronic, tape music, experimental, slam poetry
- Country of origin: U.S.
- Location: Jamaica Plain, Massachusetts
- Official website: whitehausfamilyrecord.com

The Whitehaus Family Record is an independent record label based in the Whitehaus in Jamaica Plain, Massachusetts. It began as a community of artists, poets, and musicians who would gather and throw hootenannies. The label has distributed over 40 releases.

== History ==
In the fall of 2006 the members of an arts collective known as the Treemausers began holding performance events in their tiny apartment in Jamaica Plain. Their goal was to create something unlike anything else they could find in Boston; a weekly performance space, open to the public, sustainable and safe, devoid of social competition, and pushing the boundaries of consciousness, experience and thought. The Treemausers spread their ideas around JP by word of mouth and through their popular publication, the Treemausers Gazette.

As Hootennanies began to grow, the Treemauses moved into a five story mansion that was recently re-built from a state of dilapidation. The carpenters working on the site had nicknamed it “la casa blanca”, so the Whitehaus was born. The house itself has had a strong reputation in the music community for a while as it hosted a show by Nirvana in the late 80's before their first LP came out.

In February 2008, Many Mansions organized a show in the Whitehaus called Psych-Fest and this marked the beginning of the WFR movement away from Hootenannies and toward Happenings. The success of Psych-Fest gave the WFR the impetus to organize their biggest event at that time, Blastfest. Since the Blastfest, the label has had over 40 releases, over 20 artists and has organized shows for Anis Mojgani, Guatemala City, Christians & Lions, The Needy Visions, Baxia, and many other artists.
