= The Fire (Senses Fail album) =

Studio album by Senses Fail
- Released: October 26, 2010
- Recorded: June 2010
- Studio: Salad Days, Baltimore, Maryland
- Genre: Post-hardcore; emo
- Length: 38:33
- Label: Vagrant
- Producer: Brian McTernan

Senses Fail chronology
Life Is Not a Waiting Room (2008)	The Fire (2010)	Follow Your Bliss: The Best of Senses Fail (2012)

Senses Fail studio album chronology
Life Is Not a Waiting Room (2008)	The Fire (2010)	Renacer (2013)

The Fire is the fourth studio album by American rock band Senses Fail and was released on October 26, 2010 through Vagrant Records. It is the first album since Zack Roach replaced Heath Saraceno on guitar, however Garrett Zablocki recorded all the guitar on the album. It is the last album to feature Zablocki as well, as he left the band in 2011.

This album has two tracks that are featured on Senses Fail's greatest hits album Follow Your Bliss: The Best of Senses Fail. The two tracks are "The Fire" and "New Year's Eve".

== Background and production ==
Senses Fail's third studio album Life Is Not a Waiting Room (2008) was released the week following the 2008 financial market crashing. It subsequently impacted the music industry, affecting the money that bands earned through sales. Vocalist Buddy Nielsen said: "[Y]ou started to see this dramatic shift of, 'Oh, this is kind of all gonna fall apart.'" In August 2009, guitarist Heath Saraceno left the band, citing a need to leave the music industry and seek a different career. In January 2010, it was reported that Zack Roach was the group's new guitarist. The band then became embroiled in a legal battle with former guitarist Dave Miller over royalties, which would last a few years.

Recording for their next album took place at Salad Days Studios, close to Baltimore, Maryland with producer Brian McTernan in June 2010. The band spent eight months up to this point working on their next album, coming up with 17 songs. Paul Leavitt acted as the Pro Tools engineer; McTernan mixed the recordings, before they were mastered by Ryan Smith at Sterling Sound in New York City.

== Composition ==
Musically, The Fire has been described as post-hardcore, showcasing an increased capacity of aggressive and heavy tracks, namely "New Year's Eve", "Coward", "Lifeboats" and "Irish Eyes". Discussing the album's title, Nielsen explained that the group when through various rough patches over the previous two years and was representative of how the members were feeling. He said: "Like we felt like we walked through a tragedy… or the fire… and come out on the other side." When asked about the writing process, Nielsen said the band would jam and piece together songs from there. Nielsen stated that the album "is a reaction and a release of a whirlwind of emotions that came from fighting for what we love and dealing with change and growth both personally and creatively".

The album opens with its title-track, which is a mix of post-hardcore and space rock. The pop rock song "Saint Anthony" is named after the patron saint of lost possessions. Nielsen said the song was about his self-doubt: "That's something that everybody feels, but I definitely wanted to address that ... and rid myself of it". The intro guitar riff to "Coward" recalled the Life Is Not a Waiting Room track "Lungs Like Gallows". The alternative rock track "Landslide" musically recalled "Can't Be Saved", from the group's Still Searching (2006) album, and incorporated the use of hardcore punk-esque gang vocals. It talks about Nielsen's resolve to live his life in the moment and not in the future. With "Headed West", Nielsen latched onto the idea that moving somewhere else would solves his problems.

== Release ==
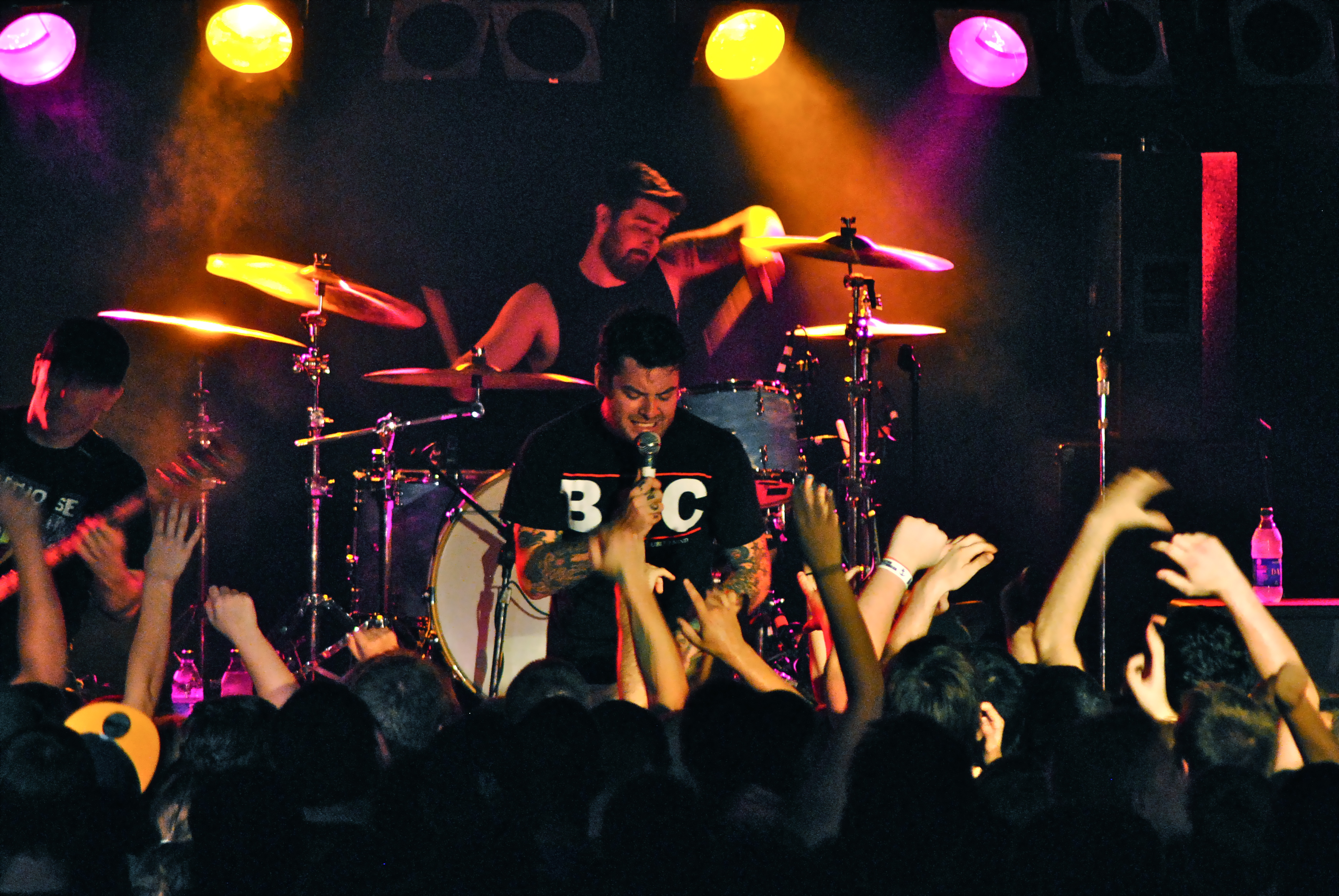
Guitarist Matt Smith, drummer Dan Trapp and vocalist Buddy Nielsen performing, July 14, 2011

On July 26, 2010, The Fire was announced for release in October. In August, the band went on a tour of Australia. On August 26, "Saint Anthony" was on posted on the band's Myspace profile. On September 9, the album's track listing was revealed. On September 27, the band posted "The Fire" online. On October 6, a lyric video was released for "New Year's Eve". The band asked fans to volunteer to be in a music video for the song "The Fire", which was filmed in New York City on October 9 and 10. On October 18, The Fire was made available for streaming on Myspace. It was released on October 26 through Vagrant Records. The iTunes edition included "Ghost Town" as a bonus track. The UK edition was released through Hassle Records. Some copies came with a live DVD, which was filmed at a hometown Halloween show at Starland Ballroom in New Jersey in October 2009. It contains live footage and interviews with the band, and was directed by Adam Rothlein.

In October and November, the group went on a co-headlining US tour with Bayside, dubbed Out with the In Crowd Tour. They were supported by Title Fight and Balance and Composure. In January 2011, guitarist Garrett Zablocki left the group and was replaced by Matt Smith of Strike Anywhere. At the time, Zablocki reasoned that he left to attend college full time. He later revealed he felt burnt out and "didn’t want to be 30 and looking for an entry-level job." In February, the band went on a tour of the UK with support from Man Overboard. On February 18, "The Fire" music video was released. It was directed by Richard Borge. On March 10, a music video was released for "New Years Eve".

In March and April, the band went on a US tour, supported by The Ghost Inside, Man Overboard and Transit. Following this, the band performed a handful of east coast shows, before appearing at The Bamboozle and Groezrock festivals. In November, the group went on a headlining US tour with support from Make Do and Mend, Stick to Your Guns and The Story So Far. The Fire was intended to be released on vinyl, through Mightier Than Sword Records, to coincide with the tour. However, the vinyl edition wasn't released until February 2012.

== Reception ==
Professional ratings
Aggregate scores
Source	Rating
Metacritic	78/100
Review scores
Source	Rating
AbsolutePunk	81%
AllMusic	3.5/5 stars
Alter the Press!	3/5 stars
Beat	Favorable
Big Cheese	3/5
Daily Dischord	4/10 stars
Dead Press!	8/10 stars
Exclaim!	Mixed
Sputnikmusic	4/5
Ultimate Guitar	5/10

The album received generally positive reception. Staff reviewer Davey Boy of Sputnikmusic praised the lyrics as well as the track arrangement, concluding that "in refining the band’s sound and style so effectively, ‘The Fire’ is ultimately a resounding success which meets its objectives." Drew Beringer of AbsolutePunk was positive, commenting "Yes, there are imperfections (a recycled riff here, some flat vocals there), but overall The Fire is the essential Senses Fail record to own" and that it is "Full of aggression and just enough catchiness to please both types of fans". AllMusic also gave a positive review, stating that the album "starts with a small spark that quickly builds itself into an emotional blaze that burns steadily across all 11 tracks, taking the listener on an exceptional musical ride" and that it "shifts gears from good cop to bad cop effortlessly".

Alter the Press! was more negative, saying "Whilst Senses Fail have proved to be consistent, 'The Fire' just about falls into being labelled as being 'safe,'" with a rating of three out of five. Daily Dischord.com also called that album 'safe' and that "Senses Fail have yet again shown no ambition to break out of their comfort zone".

== Track listing ==
All songs written by Senses Fail, lyrics by James 'Buddy' Nielsen.

No.	Title	Length
1.	"The Fire"	3:49
2.	"Saint Anthony"	3:15
3.	"New Year's Eve"	3:14
4.	"Safe House"	3:18
5.	"Coward"	3:30
6.	"Landslide"	3:48
7.	"Headed West"	3:12
8.	"Lifeboats"	3:32
9.	"Nero"	3:52
10.	"Irish Eyes"	3:23
11.	"Hold On"	3:55

iTunes bonus track
No.	Title	Length
12.	"Ghost Town"	4:00

DVD track listing
1. "Steven"
2. "Bonecrusher"
3. "Sick or Sane (Fifty For a Twenty)"
4. "Irony of Dying on Your Birthday"
5. "Lady in a Blue Dress"
6. "Wolves at the Door"
7. "Buried a Lie"
8. "NJ Falls Into the Atlantic"
9. "Rum is for Drinking, Not for Burning"
10. "Bloody Romance"
11. "Calling All Cars"
12. "Bite to Break Skin"
13. "Lungs Like Gallows"
14. "Family Tradition"
15. "Shark Attack"
16. "Can't Be Saved"
17. "187"

== Personnel ==
Personnel per booklet.

Senses Fail

- Garrett Zablocki – guitars
- James "Buddy" Nielsen – lead vocals
- Jason Black – bass
- Dan Trapp – drums
- Zack Roach – touring guitar

Production

- Brian McTernan – producer
- Paul Leavitt – Pro Tools engineer
- Ryan Smith – mastering
- Sons of Nero – design, layout

== Charts ==
Chart (2010)	Peak position
US Billboard 200	32
US Independent Albums (Billboard)	2
US Top Rock Albums (Billboard)	6
US Top Alternative Albums (Billboard)	4
US Digital Albums (Billboard)	10
US Indie Store Album Sales (Billboard)	22
