= Whitehaus =

Performance venue and artistic collective in Boston, Massachusetts

Coordinates: 42.31231°N 71.11354°W

A performer named Balloons Manfriend doing standup comedy at Whitehaus in 2015

Among "Boston's most prolific DIY venues," the Whitehaus was a non-traditional performance venue and artists collective located in an eight-bedroom home at 10 Seaverns Ave. in Jamaica Plain, Massachusetts. Music and poetry made by "the hyper-prolific Whitehaus collective" is distributed under The Whitehaus Family Record independent music label. As described by one source:

One of the most prolific new DIY collectives in Jamaica Plain, the Whitehaus Family Record, brings together folk, indie, and experimental sound to produce a psychedelic world of music, love, and all that other punk/hippie crossover goodness.

Their frequent "hootenannies" were open to anyone to share their musical or poetic talents.

The Whitehaus has not been actively hosting shows for several years.
