= Let It Enfold You =

Studio album by Senses Fail
- Released: September 7, 2004
- Recorded: April–October 2003
- Studios: Trax East, South River, New Jersey; Showplace, Dover, New Jersey; Frankensound, North Brunswick, New Jersey; Evetts' house; Mission Sound, Brooklyn, New York
- Genres: Emo; screamo; post-hardcore
- Length: 44:17
- Label: Vagrant
- Producer: Steve Evetts

Senses Fail chronology
From the Depths of Dreams (2002)	Let It Enfold You (2004)	Still Searching (2006)

Singles from Let It Enfold You
- 1. "Buried a Lie" Released: February 8, 2005; 2. "Rum Is for Drinking, Not for Burning" Released: September 11, 2005

Let It Enfold You is the debut studio album by American rock band Senses Fail, released on September 7, 2004, through Vagrant Records. After finalizing their line-up, the band released their debut EP, From the Depths of Dreams, in 2002, which attracted the attention of Drive-Thru Records. The label signed Senses Fail; it had a distribution deal with MCA Records, which allowed them to acquire acts from Drive-Thru. Recording for the band's debut occurred at several studios in New Jersey in April 2003 with producer Steve Evetts. Additional recording took place at the end of the year. Described as an emo and screamo record, several of the songs on Let It Enfold You were influenced by poetry and literature.

Prior to the release of Let It Enfold You, Senses Fail went on a co-headlining tour of the United States with Moneen, a supporting slot for Hundred Reasons in the United Kingdom, a headlining US tour, and a stint on Warped Tour. Another headlining US tour occurred at the end of the year, and was followed by a European tour with labelmates From Autumn to Ashes and Emanuel. "Buried a Lie" was released as a radio single on February 8, 2005. Senses Fail toured the US three times in 2005: appearing on Taste of Chaos and Warped Tour, and then closing the year with Saves the Day. "Rum Is for Drinking, Not for Burning" was released as a single on September 11, 2005; that same month guitarist Dave Miller was replaced by Heath Saraceno of Midtown.

Let It Enfold You received mixed reviews from critics, some of whom commented on frontman Buddy Nielsen's vocals, and others calling the music derivative. The album peaked at number 34 on the Billboard 200, and number two on the Independent Albums chart. It has since been certified gold in the US by the Recording Industry Association of America. Nearly half of the album's songs have appeared on the compilation album Follow Your Bliss: The Best of Senses Fail in 2012. Senses Fail has performed the album in its entirety in 2014, 2015, 2021, and 2024.

== Background ==
Senses Fail was formed in August 2001 by guitarist Garrett Zablocki and vocalist Buddy Nielsen. Zablocki posted an advert on the message board NJska looking for people to play local VFW halls for fun. Nielsen saw the advert, and the pair began jamming. They struggled to bring in new members and went on a break in October. They returned in February 2002 with the addition of new members. Zablocki recruited drummer Dan Trapp and guitarist Dave Miller after their previous band broke up. Zablocki met the former through a friend, and went to high school with the latter. Bassist James Gill was also brought into the fold. After writing a handful of original songs, the band started playing in VFW halls and small clubs in New Jersey. The band tracked two three-song demos, which were eventually released as From the Depths of Dreams in August 2002 through ECA Records. They supported its release with tours alongside Finch, Millencolin and The Starting Line. Within two months of its release, the band sold all available copies of the EP.

They were soon attracting a bigger fanbase through promotion online, and garnered interest from record labels. Zablocki was then contacted by independent label Drive-Thru Records, to whom he sent a demo. After a month, Drive-Thru owners Richard and Stephanie Reines flew out to watch the band live. Following the performance, the group were offered a contract with them. The band, who were fans of the label, signed with them in late 2002. Before signing with Drive-Thru, Gill was replaced by Mike Glita, formerly of Tokyo Rose. In November, Nielsen said the band were aiming to record their debut album in early 2003. From the Depths of Dreams was reissued through Drive-Thru Records in April 2003. As a partial result of widespread file sharing, the EP charted on the Billboard 200. The reissue was successful with the EP going on to sell over 256,000 copies, which caught the attention of Drive-Thru's major label distributor, MCA Records. They had a distribution deal that allowed MCA to acquire Drive-Thru Records' bands over a period of time.

All of the songs were written by the band with lyrics written by Nielsen. According to Trapp, Zablocki would come up with a riff, lead guitar part or a rough draft of a song. From there, the rest of the band would add their ideas to it and change it into a song.

== Production ==
Sessions were helmed by producer Steve Evetts. Recording took place initially in April 2003 at Trax East in South River, New Jersey, Showplace Studios in Dover, New Jersey, Frankensound Studios in North Brunswick, New Jersey, and Evetts' house. Drive-Thru Records rented a house for Senses Fail to live in while they recorded. According to Miller, the atmosphere was "like a constant party ... inviting girls over and .. smoking weed and drinking all night. The record label wanted to strangle us." Evetts visited the band and told them to take the process more seriously. Following the end of recording, the band appeared at Skate & Surf Fest in April 2003, and toured with Northstar in June, and with Moneen in July.

MCA Records was absorbed by Universal Music Group subsidiary Geffen Records in mid-2003, which resulted in its staff and roster being moved to Geffen. As an effect of this, Senses Fail's debut album was shelved for eight months. Geffen Records wanted them to come up with a hit single. Nielsen said the band were not interested in writing radio-friendly material. In spite of this, they wrote "Buried a Lie" and "Rum Is for Drinking, Not for Burning" while on tour. Both songs were then recorded between October 20 and 22, 2003 at Mission Sound in Brooklyn, New York. Evetts mixed the tracks at the Snuff Factory in Helmetta, New Jersey, while Alan Douches mastered the album at West West Side Studios. Nielsen said of the recording process: "We killed ourselves over and over trying to say what we wanted, and make the record the best it could be."

== Music and lyrics ==
Musically, the album has been classed as emo, screamo, and post-hardcore. It is considered to be a "scene album" by some publications, such as Alternative Press. It sees Nielsen switch from screaming to singing vocals, which were pop-influenced.

Zablocki said the album's opening track "Tie Her Down" is a "sort of in the middle of the 'pop-hard' mix", and is followed by the groove-orientated arena rock song "Lady in a Blue Dress". "You're Cute When You Scream" incorporates metal guitar riffs, mixing in the sound of Iron Maiden. "Buried a Lie", another arena rock song, is the poppiest-sounding track on the album. The song is followed by one of the group's harder-sounding numbers, "Bite to Break Skin", which Zablocki saw as a progression from the From the Depths of Dreams song "Bloody Romance". "Rum Is for Drinking, Not for Burning" features harmonized metal guitar solos from both Miller and Zablocki. "Choke on This", "NJ Falls Into the Atlantic" and "Angela Baker and My Obsession with Fire" all incorporate crowd participation parts, at the start or at the halfway point. "Martini Kiss" is the last harder-edged song as it concludes the album.

A number of songs on the album take influence from poetry and literature. Nielsen said the album's title comes from a Charles Bukowski poem of the same name, in which, "[h]e was a drunk, womanizing, deadbeat lowlife. But I can really relate to his cynical view of the world". Alternative Press stated that the album "showcased the band’s sensitivity toward intense topics alongside their carefree attitude." "Buried a Lie" talks about the protagonist's deceased girlfriend in a manner akin to CSI: Crime Scene Investigation. "Slow Dance" is a ballad that contains lines from the Dao De Jing. Nielsen explained he was fascinated with Daoism for a period and wrote the song to explain what it is, specifically "the idea of living a pacifist path". "Irony of Dying on Your Birthday" was inspired by the works of mythologist Joseph Campbell.

== Release ==
Despite the addition of two new songs, Geffen Records had no interest in releasing the album; because of their previous deal, it meant that Drive-Thru were unable to issue it on their own. Senses Fail decided to leak the album, encouraging fans to download it. They approached Rich Egan, owner of independent label Vagrant Records, with the intention of releasing their debut album. At the time, Vagrant had a deal with major label Interscope Records, who owned Geffen. The band were then moved from Geffen to Interscope to Vagrant. On January 26, 2004, the group posted "Buried a Lie" on their website. On February 3, Melodic reported that the group's debut would follow in the spring. In mid-June 2004, the band filmed a music video for "Buried a Lie" on the set of Guiding Light.

On July 16, 2004, it was announced that the band had signed to Vagrant Records. The "Buried a Lie" music video aired on Fuse's Oven Fresh program in mid-August 2004. It was directed Nielsen's mother Lisa Brown, both of whom came up with the concept for it. They wanted it to be a homage to Scooby-Doo, Where Are You! and The Monkees; it sees the band being framed for killing a woman. On August 13, 2004, the band posted "Buried a Lie", "Let It Enfold You" and "Rum Is for Drinking, Not for Burning" on their PureVolume account. Let It Enfold You was released on September 7, 2004, through Vagrant Records. The album's artwork was created by James Rheem Davis. Alternative Press said it featured "a man staring at the tortured soul that is himself." Initial pressings also contained a bonus DVD.

"Buried a Lie" was released to radio on February 8, 2005. While on tour, the band filmed a music video for "Rum Is for Drinking, Not for Burning" in Toronto, Canada with director Chris Mills. The video was released online on May 26, 2005; it sees the group performing in the belly of a ship, before moving to the upper deck for the chorus section. After suffering from addiction and emotional issues, Miller left the band in early September 2005, and was replaced by Heath Saraceno, formerly of Midtown. Senses Fail called Saraceno, who was aware that their previous guitarist had left. He was told to learn three tracks for a practice session, and subsequently learned all of them as he was unsure if the band was planning to audition anyone else. On September 11, 2005, "Rum Is for Drinking, Not for Burning" was released as a single. On October 16, 2005, "American Death" was posted online. On November 1, 2005, a deluxe edition of the album was released. It included three acoustic versions of previously released songs, "American Death", a cover of "Institutionalized" by Suicidal Tendencies from Tony Hawk's American Wasteland and a DVD.

== Touring ==
In November 2003, Senses Fail supported Millencolin on their headlining US tour. In January and February 2004, the band went on a co-headlining US tour with Moneen. They were supported by the Beautiful Mistake, Boys Night Out and Folly. In March 2004, the group supported Hundred Reasons on their headlining UK tour. Over the next four months, the group supported Rufio on their headlining US tour, appeared at Skate & Surf Fest, and performed on Warped Tour. Following this, the group went on a US tour with My Chemical Romance and the Bled, and appeared at Strhessfest. To promote the album's release, the band did a few in-stores acoustic performances. In September and October 2004, Senses Fail went on a headlining US tour, with support from the Bled, Name Taken, Silverstein and Moneen.

In November and December 2004, Senses Fail went on the Vagrant Europe Tour alongside From Autumn to Ashes, Moneen, and Emanuel. Following this, the group played three US shows with Paulson, Midtown and Moneen. At the start of 2005, the band played at a benefit concert for victims of the 2004 tsunami. From February to April 2005, the band performed as part of the Taste of Chaos tour in North America. Between June and August 2005, the band appeared on Warped Tour again. To close out the year, they embarked on a three-month US tour with Saves the Day, and were supported by the Early November and Emanuel.

== Reception and legacy ==
Professional ratings
Review scores
Source	Rating
AllMusic	2.5/5 stars
The Boston Phoenix	2.5/5 stars
IGN	6.2/10
Melodic	3.5/5 stars

Let It Enfold You was met with mixed reviews from music critics. AllMusic reviewer Alex Henderson said Senses Fail does not "bring anything new or different to the table; originality isn't a high priority on this album. Nonetheless, most of their material is catchy enough ... and Senses Fail does have a knack for coming up with intriguing song titles". He complimented Nielsen's clean vocals, stating he "definitely ha[s] the upper hand", and if the band removed the screaming vocals, they "wouldn't be radically different from Jimmy Eat World, Good Charlotte or the Promise Ring". Melodic's Kaj Roth found the album to be a "screamo emo affair", and stated that with "anthemic songs" such as "Buried a Lie" and "Lady in a Blue Dress", the band were "here to stay whether you like it or not!"

The Boston Phoenix's Sean Richardson said that the band were " perfectly positioned to fill the [Saves the Day] void for the harder, punchier stuff" with Let It Enfold You. Exclaim! writer Sam Sutherland said Nielsen's vocals could "take some getting used to", though they were not "entirely terrible, and at least somewhat original". He added that "much of the record suffers from the 'Where have I heard this before?' syndrome". JR of IGN said he was aware of the band's "derivative pedigree" from his first listen of Let It Enfold You, and said there was "nothing distinctive about it whatsoever". He summarized it as an "interesting-but-somewhat-standard affair", criticized Nielsen's screaming vocals as being "excessively strained and out-of-place".

Let It Enfold You peaked at number 34 on the Billboard 200, selling 25,000 copies during its first week of release. It also charted at number two on the Independent Albums chart. It was certified gold by the Recording Industry Association of America in the US in 2020. In May 2012, the band released a greatest hits compilation Follow Your Bliss: The Best of Senses Fail which featured "You're Cute When You Scream", "Rum Is for Drinking, Not for Burning", "Lady in a Blue Dress", "Bite to Break Skin" and "Buried a Lie". That same month, Let It Enfold You was released on vinyl. In 2014, the group celebrated the album's 10th anniversary with a month-long tour where they performed the album in its entirety. They did additional shows performing the album between February and April 2015. The band performed it again in 2021, alongside their second studio album Still Searching (2006), as a livestreamed event from the Joshua Tree National Park.

In 2020, Alternative Press Magazine wrote that the album contained "some of the best post-hardcore songs of the 2000s." The same year, the staff of Loudwire wrote: "As a full-length debut, this album is impressive enough; its impact can still be seen rippling across the scene."

== Track listing ==
All songs written by Senses Fail, all lyrics written by Buddy Nielsen.

No.	Title	Length
1.	"Tie Her Down"	3:08
2.	"Lady in a Blue Dress"	3:18
3.	"You're Cute When You Scream"	2:25
4.	"Buried a Lie"	2:59
5.	"Bite to Break Skin"	3:31
6.	"Rum Is for Drinking, Not for Burning"	2:43
7.	"Slow Dance"	3:06
8.	"Choke on This"	3:22
9.	"NJ Falls Into the Atlantic"	3:48
10.	"Let It Enfold You"	5:03
11.	"Irony of Dying on Your Birthday"	2:59
12.	"Angela Baker and My Obsession with Fire"	4:04
13.	"Martini Kiss"	3:51
Total length:		44:17

Deluxe edition CD bonus tracks
14. "Institutionalized" (Suicidal Tendencies) – 3:48
15. "American Death" – 3:32
16. "Lady in a Blue Dress (acoustic)" – 3:21
17. "Buried a Lie (acoustic)" – 3:04
18. "Rum Is for Drinking, Not for Burning (acoustic)" – 3:04
DVD track listing

Original release DVD
Then and Now:

1. Original "187"
2. "Steven" Short Cuts
3. Worcester "187"
4. First Tour
5. Oxford
6. Taco Bell Dumpster
7. The Stripper (Buddy's Birthday)
8. "Free Fall Without A Parachute" Video
9. In The Studio
10. "Bastard Son" Video
11. I Want To Pee! (Japanese Video)
12. "Let It Enfold You" - Buddy Explains
13. The U.K. And Shakespeare
14. "Rum Is For Drinking, Not For Burning" Video
15. "Lady In A Blue Dress" Video
16. You're Cute When You Scream: The Movie
17. "You're Cute When You Scream" Video
18. In The Beginning...
19. Credits And Thanks
20. The Future...

Deluxe edition DVD
Live from the Taste of Chaos tour:

- "Bloody Romance"
- "You're Cute When You Scream"
- "Irony of Dying on Your Birthday"

Music Videos:

- "Buried a Lie"
- "Rum Is for Drinking, Not for Burning"

== Personnel ==
Personnel per booklet.

Senses Fail

- Mike Glita – bass guitar, backing vocals
- Dave Miller – rhythm guitar
- Buddy Nielsen – lead vocals
- Dan Trapp – drums, percussion
- Garrett Zablocki – lead guitar, backing vocals

Production

- Steve Evetts – producer, mixing, recording
- Alan Douches – mastering
- James Rheem Davis – artwork
- Jarin Blaschke – band photo

== Charts ==
Chart performance for Let It Enfold You
Chart (2004)	Peak position
US Billboard 200	34
US Independent Albums (Billboard)	2

Chart performance for Let It Enfold You
Chart (2012)	Peak position
US Vinyl Albums (Billboard)	11

== Certifications ==
Certifications for Let It Enfold You
Region	Certification	Certified units/sales
United States (RIAA)	Gold	500,000^{‡}
^{‡} Sales+streaming figures based on certification alone.
