= From the Depths of Dreams =

EP by Senses Fail
- Released: August 13, 2002
- Studio: Nada Engineering Studio (New Windsor, New York)
- Genre: Post-hardcore; screamo; emo
- Length: 25:30
- Label: ECA
- Producer: John Naclerio, Senses Fail

Senses Fail chronology
From the Depths of Dreams (2002)	Let It Enfold You (2004)

Re-release (2003)

From the Depths of Dreams is the debut EP by American rock band Senses Fail. It was recorded at Nada Engineering Studio in New Windsor, New York, with John Naclerio and the band acting as producers. Naclerio served as engineer and mixed the EP, before it was mastered by Steven Marcussen at Marcussen Mastering in Hollywood, California. Only 300 copies were originally released by ECA Records on August 16, 2002, and so it was released with new artwork and two bonus tracks on April 29, 2003 on Drive-Thru Records.

The tracks "One Eight Seven" and "Bloody Romance" were released on Senses Fail's greatest hits album Follow Your Bliss: The Best Of Senses Fail. The EP was re-recorded with the current lineup in 2019 and released as the "re-imagined" version.

== Style ==
The EP contains elements of punk rock, emo and progressive metal, subverting the trend of incorporating elements of pop and pop-punk that was prevalent at the time. According to AllMusic, "There's a seriousness of purpose that's the dominant tone here, and an artful angularity to the production and arrangements."

== Background ==
Senses Fail was formed in August 2001 by guitarist Garrett Zablocki and vocalist Buddy Nielsen when Zablocki posted an advert on the message board NJska looking for people to play local VFW halls for fun. Nielsen saw the advert, and the pair began jamming. They struggled to bring in new members and went on a break in October. They returned in February 2002 with the addition of new members. Zablocki recruited drummer Dan Trapp and guitarist Dave Miller after their previous band broke up. Zablocki met the former through a friend, and went to high school with the latter. Bassist James Gill was also brought into the fold. After writing a handful of original songs, the band started playing in VFW halls and small clubs in New Jersey. The band tracked two three-song demos, which were eventually released as From the Depths of Dreams in August 2002 through ECA Records. They supported its release with tours alongside Finch, Millencolin and The Starting Line. Within two months of its release, the band sold all available copies of the EP.

== Track listing ==
All music by Senses Fail, all lyrics by Buddy Nielsen.

1. "Steven" – 4:25
2. "Free Fall Without a Parachute" – 4:17
3. "Bloody Romance" – 3:55
4. "Dreaming a Reality" – 5:00
5. "The Ground Folds" – 4:00
6. "One Eight Seven" – 4:16

Bonus tracks

In addition to the first six tracks, the Drive-Thru Records re-release of the CD featured the following:

1. "Handguns and Second Chances" – 2:21
2. "The Ground Folds (Acoustic)" – 4:30

== Personnel ==
Personnel per booklet.

Senses Fail

- Buddy Nielsen – lead vocals
- Garrett Zablocki – guitar
- Dave Miller – guitar
- Dan Trapp – drums
- Mike Glita – bass

Production

- John Naclerio – producer, engineer, mixing
- Senses Fail – producer
- Steve Marcussen – mastering
- Francisco Enciso – illustrations
- Joshua M. Ortega – design, layout

== Chart performance ==
Chart (2003)	Peak position
US Billboard 200	144
US Heatseekers Albums (Billboard)	4
