= Renacer (Senses Fail album) =

Studio album by Senses Fail
- Released: March 26, 2013
- Recorded: November–December 2012
- Studio: Red Bull Studio and The Airport Studio, Los Angeles, California
- Genre: Melodic hardcore; metalcore; sludge metal
- Length: 43:04
- Label: Staple
- Producer: Shaun Lopez

Senses Fail chronology
Follow Your Bliss: The Best of Senses Fail (2012)	Renacer (2013)	Pull the Thorns from Your Heart (2015)

Senses Fail studio album chronology
The Fire (2010)	Renacer (2013)	Pull the Thorns from Your Heart (2015)

Singles from Renacer
- 1. "Mi Amor" Released: February 4, 2013

Renacer (Spanish: "to be reborn") is the fifth studio album by American post-hardcore band Senses Fail, released on March 26, 2013.

Renacer is the first album without founding member and guitarist Garrett Zablocki, with Matt Smith (of Strike Anywhere) joining as his replacement. Bassist Jason Black did not participate in the writing/recording of the album due to obligations with Hot Water Music. Instead, Zack Roach performed bass on the album. It is also the final album to feature long time drummer Dan Trapp, as he parted ways with the band in late 2014, leaving Neilsen as the band's sole founding member. The album sees the band exploring heavier sounds, such as metalcore, hardcore punk, and sludge metal.

== Background ==
In January 2011, founding guitarist Garrett Zablocki left the group and was replaced by Matt Smith of Strike Anywhere. After a UK tour in February and a US tour in March, the group mainly hung out in the following season, occasionally playing shows. During this time, they met up to figure out the new writing process between existing guitarist Zach Roach and the newly-added Smith to see how things would play out, rather than actually writing new material. In February 2012, the band started writing for their next album. In April, vocalist Buddy Nielsen revealed that the group planned to record following their stint on the Warped Tour.

They had been writing new material on and off for sometime with co-writer Jeremy Comitas in his Northern New Jersey studio, and were aiming to continue writing during Warped Tour. In addition, they expected to have a new album out by February or March 2013. While on Warped Tour, the group released a best-of compilation Follow Your Bliss: The Best of Senses Fail. On their tour bus, they set up a V-drum kit in the back lounge of their tour bus and would take turns jamming with drummer Dan Trapp and co-writer Jeremy Comitas who filled in as bassist in place of Jason Black on the tour. They shared the rough ideas from each day with the rest of the members and rework them over a period of time.

== Production ==
Sessions for their new album took place in Los Angeles, California with producer Shaun Lopez. The band opted to work with Lopez, as opposed to Brian McTernan, who produced the group's preceding three studio albums, as they "needed to change everything up", according to Nielsen. He theorised they wouldn't have written the songs they did if they knew they'd be using McTernan again. Both Nielsen and Trapp wanted to work with someone else and record in a different studio. Nielsen said Lopez's prior experience with Far, Crosses and Deftones was "perfect for where we were trying to go." Recording started on November 13, 2012; by November 17, they had finished tracking drums at Red Bull Studios. That same day, Smith laid down scratch guitar for the songs.

The group took November 19 off as Lopez wanted to spend the day working on the drums. The following day, they relocated to Lopez's The Airport Studio to track bass, which was done by November 23. Roach remarked they felt like "kids in a candy store" as Lopez's studio had around 30 guitars and hundreds of vintage guitar pedals they could work with. They tracked rhythm guitars and vocals into early December, typically with guitars being done until 8 pm, by which point they'd shift to vocals. With most of the guitars done, the group minus Nielsen would spend time relaxing at their apartment or looking around Los Angeles, before going back to the studio to hear Nielsen's vocals. Eventually, Roach and Smith flew home, leaving Nielsen and Trapp to finish minor parts and supervise the mixing process.

== Composition ==
According to the band's bio-page on Staple Records, the album title Renacer means "to be reborn" in Spanish. This serves as the main theme of the album as Nielsen wanted to take a heavier and more adventurous creative direction. "Mi Amor" is sung mostly in Spanish, Nielsen stated: "We have always wanted to do a song in Spanish... I was searching for a different type of screaming pattern for the song and decided to try to write a line or two in Spanish—just to see if it would spark an idea. I went line by line translating from English to Spanish—all the while making sure the rhyme scheme worked out and it actually made sense. It came together so well that I just rolled with it.”. "The Path" is about approaching life with a positive attitude.

Renacer features a heavier melodic hardcore, heavy hardcore, and metalcore sound, in contrast to earlier albums' post-hardcore sound. They had removed almost all of the pop elements, and replaced them with hardcore riffs and breakdowns. It also has elements of sludge metal. About the sound of the new album, Nielsen stated he had always wanted to move away from the pop-orientated sound to a "heavier and more exploratory [direction]" as he wanted there to be more "space, because we wanted the record to sound heavy and open. If you want something to sound heavy, it’s about the space, not necessarily just the chord structures or the screaming." He said the stylistic change was down to the new song writers in the group, in addition to his urge for a new sound. Nielsen had previously explored hardcore with Bayonet in 2009. It was a side project that served as a collaboration between Nielsen and the Banner guitarist Jeremy Comitas, who co-wrote with the group for Renacer.

On the album's influences, Nielsen said in an interview with The Aquarian, "our new music is influenced by new bands. I mean, I’m definitely influenced by older stuff, but Senses Fail is always influenced by current music. To the joy of some people and to the anger of some people who kind of want us to remain the same, that’s sort of how I go about this band."

== Release ==
On January 14, 2013, Renacer was announced for release in March. "Mi Amor" was released as a single on February 4. On March 1, "The Path" was made available for streaming. A trailer for the album was released on March 15. Renacer was made available for streaming via MTV on March 20, before being released on March 26 through Vagrant Records imprint Staple Records. A music video was released for "Mi Amor" on April 10, directed by Behn Fannin. The video features a panda bear coming to life. Neilsen described the idea behind it as wishing to make something which would "spur people to watch the video more than once." The two ways he thought would accomplish this was by having shock value or being funny, with the latter being chosen. The song's theme, being that "love can change all, whether it is human love or panda love", served as "a funny, cute way to show a visual representation of 'Mi Amor' and what it might mean to others." Nielsen also stated the original plan was for a soft porn/horror movie, but since he thought no one would like it, they opted for pandas.

For touring, Gavin Caswell took over bassist Jason Black's position. In April and May, the band went on a headlining US tour with support from Such Gold, Real Friends and Major League. For the first 500 people that pre-ordered tickets, they were given a three-track EP, which consisted of covers: "Mouth for War" by Pantera, "Suffer" by Bad Religion" and "AM/PM" by American Nightmare. In May and June, the group went on a headlining UK tour with support from Handguns, before embarking on a few European dates. On August 2, a music video was released for "Between the Mountains and the Sea", directed by Markus Lundqvist and filmed in Stockholm, Sweden. The clip features an elderly couple having difficulty with basic tasks, such as eating breakfast and consuming pills. Nielsen said the video's goal was to "show that sadness and hopefulness at times coexist." Following the video, the band went on an Australian tour; they were supported on each date by several local acts. In October and November, the group went on a headlining US tour with support from For the Fallen Dreams, Expire and Being as an Ocean.

== Reception ==
Professional ratings
Aggregate scores
Source	Rating
Metacritic	73/100
Review scores
Source	Rating
Alternative Press	4/5 stars
Alter the Press!	5/5 stars
Dead Press!	8/10 stars
idobi	3.75/5
Mountain Times	Favorable
The Music	Unfavorable
PopMatters	4/10 stars
Ultimate Guitar	7.7/10

The album received mostly positive reception. Edward Strickson of Alternative Press gave Renacer a 4/5, praising the band's contrast in sound in comparison to their other albums. Ultimate Guitar praised the album, calling it "quite possibly the best album they've ever made."

However, in a 4/10 review, Pop Matters criticized the lyrics and stated the album "paints a clear portrait of a band lacking the courage and will to abandon the tendencies they have clearly grown out of and no longer stand behind."

== Track listing ==
No.	Title	Length
1.	"Renacer"	2:27
2.	"Holy Mountain"	3:52
3.	"Mi Amor"	3:29
4.	"Closure/Rebirth"	3:24
5.	"The Path"	3:54
6.	"Canine"	3:27
7.	"Glass"	4:22
8.	"Ancient Tombs"	4:00
9.	"Frost Flower"	2:22
10.	"Snake Bite"	3:45
11.	"Courage of the Knife"	3:15
12.	"Between the Mountains and the Sea"	4:57
Total length:		43:04

== Personnel ==
- Buddy Nielsen – lead vocals
- Zack Roach – guitars, backing vocals, bass guitar
- Matt Smith – guitars, backing vocals
- Dan Trapp – drums, percussion
- Shaun Lopez – producer

== Charts ==
Chart (2013)	Peak position
US Billboard 200	84
US Independent Albums (Billboard)	15
US Top Rock Albums (Billboard)	26
US Top Hard Rock Albums (Billboard)	3
US Top Alternative Albums (Billboard)	16
