= Life Is Not a Waiting Room =

Studio album by Senses Fail
- Released: October 7, 2008
- Recorded: May–June 2008
- Studios: Salad Days, Fells Point, Maryland
- Genres: Post-hardcore; emo; metalcore
- Length: 43:58
- Label: Vagrant
- Producer: Brian McTernan

Senses Fail chronology
Still Searching (2006)	Life Is Not a Waiting Room (2008)	The Fire (2010)

Singles from Life Is Not a Waiting Room
- 1. "Family Tradition" Released: August 26, 2008

Life Is Not a Waiting Room is the third studio album by American post-hardcore band Senses Fail, released on October 7, 2008 through Vagrant Records. Following the release of the band's second studio album Still Searching (2006), bassist Mike Glita left the band. He was replaced by Jason Black of Hot Water Music shortly afterwards. In early 2008, they were demoing new songs, and by April 2008, they had recorded their next album at Salad Days Studios in Fells Point, Maryland with producer Brian McTernan. Life Is Not a Waiting Room is a post-hardcore and metalcore album about the end of frontman Buddy Nielsen's relationship and dealing with his alcoholism and depression.

Life Is Not a Waiting Room received generally favorable reviews from critics, some of whom praised the musicianship, while others commented on Nielsen's lyricism. It reached number 18 on the Billboard 200, as well as the top 20 on various Billboard component charts, including topping the Independent Albums chart. "Family Tradition" was released as the album's lead single in August 2008; the band went on a headlining tour of the United States to close out the year. In early 2009, the band performed on the Saints & Sinners tour and embarked on a tour of Europe, prior to an appearance on the Warped Tour. Guitarist Heath Saraceno left the band after the latter; they ended the year with another headlining US tour.

== Background and production ==
Sense Fail's second studio album Still Searching, produced by Brian McTernan, was released in October 2006. In August 2007, it was reported that the band was in a studio. In October and November 2007, they went on a co-headlining tour of the US with New Found Glory. During this, Senses Fail wrote some new guitar riffs for future material. In December 2007, it was announced that bassist Mike Glita left the group on mutual terms. In addition, the band revealed they had started writing for their next album the week before. Throughout January and February 2008, the band wrote material in guitarist Garrett Zablocki's basement; during this period, they started demoing what they had.

On January 27, 2008, it was reported that Jason Black of Hot Water Music was filling in on bass. Black heard of Glita's departure and called McTernan, who had previously produced Hot Water Music. Black queried if the band needed a bassist and asked for contact information. At the time, Brendan Brown, vocalist/bassist for The Receiving End of Sirens, was planning to join Senses Fail. Brown lived close by and was able to practice with the band whenever, whereas Black lived far away. However, Brown was unable to join when he had a kid. Nielsen subsequently contacted Black and invited him to jam. Guitarist Heath Saraceno had previously met Black at the 2002 Warped Tour; he said Hot Water Music was one of his favorite bands.

After a week's break following writing in the basement, they decided to visit McTernan to show him what they had up to this point, namely, "Wolves at the Door", "Garden State" and "Chandelier". After re-working those songs, they wrote some additional songs while at McTernan's residence. The majority of March 2008 was spent working towards finished material. On April 1, 2008, the band went to Salad Days Studios in Fells Point, Maryland, where they would do further refining and wrote around ten more songs. In May and June 2008, the band recorded what would become Life Is Not a Waiting Room at the aforementioned studio. Paul Leavitt acted as Pro Tools engineer. Around this time, Alternative Press stated that Black, still dubbed temporary bassist, was fulfilling that role during the recording.

== Music and lyrics ==
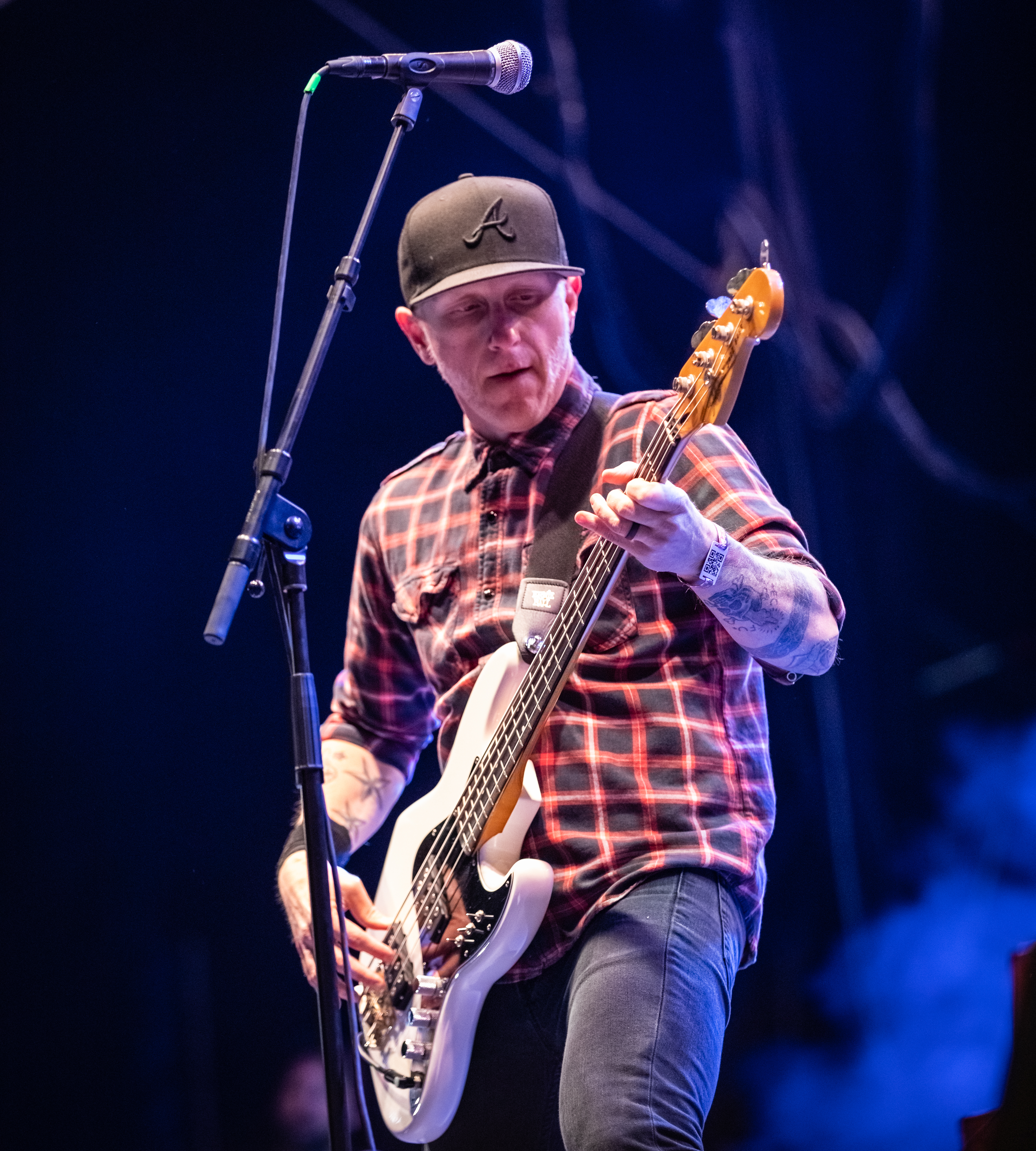
Frontman Buddy Nielsen felt that Jason Black (pictured) provided the band with more intricate basslines, something they did not have previously.

Musically, Life Is Not a Waiting Room has been classed as post-hardcore and metalcore, drawing comparison to Further Seems Forever. Alternative Press described the album as representing "scene music". While the making-of Still Searching saw McTernan offer little input, as the songs were largely done in Zablocki's basement, he was present throughout the writing sessions for Life Is Not a Waiting Room. Upon hearing a guitar riff that he felt show potential, McTernan would leave the room and let the band write a song around it. After returning, McTernan would steer the song in a particular direction so that they could deem it completed. Nielsen mentioned that McTernan helped to "try and change things up" within the verse–chorus–verse structure. The album featured some of the band's heaviest and slowest songs. Nielsen said this was an intentional inclusion: "We always try to balance [between having heavy and catchy songs on] it as best as we can." However, he found difficulty in it: "The hardest part is trying to find the best mix of what you wanna do and what you think Senses Fail are."

Saraceno's guitar parts worked as a counterpart to Zablocki's; the pair bounced ideas off each other. The album features more shredding than their past releases. Saraceno was aware that listeners are drawn to the vocals and made sure to "lend texture and melody to the composition, but not overcrowd the vocals". With Black, he added the dynamic of intricate bass parts to the band, something that Nielsen said they never had previously. Nielsen said there was "a real sense of urgency" in the songs. He added that they have "a lot of grit and power" and reminded him of how he felt when he was writing the From the Depths of Dreams (2002) EP. The album's title, Life Is Not a Waiting Room, comes from a Charles Bukowski poem. Nielsen explained that he felt he "had been living as if I was waiting for something to happen … [it] sums up the direction I want to go in, and what I want to get away from". Saraceno said it refers to the "realisation that your past is your past, and that you should begin to actually live your life - you only grow older, and life passes you by".

Life Is Not a Waiting Room chronicles Nielsen's hardship in breaking up with his long-time girlfriend, and his downward spiral into a life of alcoholism and depression. A terminally ill fan of Nielsen named Marcel helped him get through his depression and also "opened his eyes to some hard truths about the reality of the human condition." He had met Marcel during a show in Dallas, Texas. "Fireworks at Dawn" is a slow-tempo track that transitions into "Lungs Like Gallows". The guitar parts in "Hair of the Dog" recalled U2 guitarist The Edge with its usage of delay. Marcel influenced the creation of "Four Years" and "Yellow Angels". The former is about the reaction to meeting Macel and needing to live in the moment. Nielsen said the latter is about being influenced by "such a life-changing [experience]" and making new decisions with his relationship. "Map the Streets" toys with pop punk in the verse sections, becoming reminiscent of the group's earlier material.

== Release ==
In early May 2008, the band appeared at The Bamboozle festival. On June 25, Life Is Not a Waiting Room was announced for release in October. In addition, the album's track listing was revealed, followed the album's artwork on July 31. On August 19, "Family Tradition" was posted on the group's Myspace account; it was released as the album's lead single on August 26, 2008. In addition, it was also released as an EP on iTunes bundled with "Wolves at the Door", "Life Is Not a Waiting Room" and clips of every song on the album. On September 15, when fans bought any item of Atticus Clothing, they were given a free download of "Wolves at the Door", which was then posted on the band's Myspace the following day. On September 23, "Garden State" was posted on the group's Myspace. Life Is Not a Waiting Room was made available for streaming on their Myspace on October 2, 2008, before being released four days later through Vagrant Records. The artwork was done by design company Sons of Nero; it shows a person in a waiting room wearing a mask. Saraceno said in contrast to the band's previous albums, they wanted something "slightly more organic" as the concept of a "singular, striking matte image proved more appealing". The idea for it originated from Nielsen, who then detailed it to the rest of the band. Matt Hay of NORA, who formed Sons of Nero, contacted the band a few weeks after this and showed them some photographs. One of the images, of a kid holding black balloons on a park bench was included in the booklet. The iTunes and UK editions included bonus tracks.

On the same day as the album's release, "Family Tradition" was released to radio. In October and November, the band went on headlining US tour with support from Dance Gavin Dance, the Number Twelve Looks Like You and Foxy Shazam. On October 24, a music video for "Family Tradition" premiered through Yahoo! Music. On November 13, the band appeared on The Daily Habit. Between late February and early April 2009, the band performed on the Saints & Sinners tour. Further dates were added, extending the tour into mid-April. Following an appearance at Groezrock festival, the band toured Europe in April and May. Between late June and late August, the band performed on the Warped Tour. Following the tour's conclusion, Saraceno left the band. Nielsen said Saraceno wanted to "leave the music business and pursue a career in another field." In September and October, the group went on a headlining US tour with support from A Skylit Drive, Closure in Moscow and Fact. Etay Pisano joined the band as a touring guitarist for the tour. Saraceno returned to play the Hawlloween show of the tour, which was filmed and later released with some copies of their next album The Fire (2010).

Three songs off of this album—"Family Tradition", "Lungs Like Gallows", and "Wolves at the Door"—are featured on the band's greatest hits album Follow Your Bliss: The Best of Senses Fail. On September 4, 2013, the band announced the first ever vinyl pressings of the album. 500 blue and gray swirl and 500 tye-dye splatter copies of the album were released on October 8, 2013.

In October 2022, the album received a second vinyl pressing, this time as a double 10” LP. The second pressing of the record featured silver, sky blue/white splatter, orange, and silver/blue/purple variants, following a 15th anniversary tour for the album where it was played in full alongside a greatest hits setlist.

== Reception ==
Professional ratings
Review scores
Source	Rating
AbsolutePunk	76%
AllMusic	3.5/5 stars
PopMatters	4/10 stars
Rock Hard	8/10
Ultimate Guitar	8/10

Life Is Not a Waiting Room was met with generally favourable reviews from music critics. AbsolutePunk staff member Drew Beringer said the band "does little tinkering with their successful formula" of their past release, as McTernan helped to mesh the twelve tracks into a seamless journey". He said they "created a consistent product without resorting to the trends that are abundant in the scene today". AllMusic reviewer Andrew Leahey noted that there was a "good deal of harmony here, from the dual guitar solos" of Zablocki and Saraceno to Senses Fail's "use of vocal harmonies". PopMatters contributor Bill Stewart said from a "purely musical standpoint, the album, while still not exactly interesting, fares better" than the lyrics, as it displays a band at their "most powerful when they drop the weepy soul-searching and allow their visceral, metal-influenced hardcore to take center stage". Rock Hard writer Buffo Schnädelbach said amongst several of the album's tracks, the band "will not only score big in the under 20 age group," but also envisioned success for them at radio and MTV.

Stewart wrote that listeners should give the band "some mercy" as the album is, "in every respect, is a melodramatic and awkward". He went on call the lyrics "lazy, stock images", offered with a "coupling of self-important gravitas and a complete lack of all but the most rudimentary poetic grace". Beringer, meanwhile, felt that Nielson had "made incredible strides in both his writing and delivery" as his words had "become his own form of self-medication of anxiety and depression". The staff at Ultimate Guitar said Nielson did his "best to deliver a fresh perspective on topics that have been covered before". They noted that some songs had a "descriptive style," while other tracks "tend to have more of a straightforward, honest feel to them."

Life Is Not a Waiting Room peaked at number 18 on the US Billboard 200. Alongside this, it topped Independent Albums, and reached number five on Alternative Albums, number six on Top Rock Albums, and number 13 on Tastemaker Albums.

== Track listing ==
All songs written by Senses Fail. Lyrics by Buddy Nielsen.

No.	Title	Length
1.	"Fireworks at Dawn"	2:09
2.	"Lungs Like Gallows"	3:20
3.	"Garden State"	3:38
4.	"Family Tradition"	3:34
5.	"Wolves at the Door"	3:27
6.	"Hair of the Dog"	3:50
7.	"Four Years"	4:15
8.	"Ali for Cody"	4:02
9.	"Yellow Angels"	3:42
10.	"Chandelier"	3:40
11.	"Map the Streets"	3:27
12.	"Blackout"	4:54

Bonus tracks
No.	Title	Length
13.	"Life Is Not a Waiting Room" (UK bonus track)	3:18
14.	"DB Cooper" (iTunes/UK bonus track)	3:01
15.	"Coming Up Short" (iTunes bonus track)	2:14

== Personnel ==
Personnel per booklet.

Senses Fail

- Buddy Nielsen – lead vocals
- Garrett Zablocki – lead guitar
- Heath Saraceno – rhythm guitar, backing vocals
- Dan Trapp – drums
- Jason Black – bass

Production

- Brian McTernan – producer
- Paul Leavitt – Pro Tools engineer
- Sons of Nero – layout, design, concept
- Buddy Nielsen – concept
- Phill Mamula – photography

== Charts ==
Chart performance for Life Is Not a Waiting Room
Chart (2008)	Peak position
Canadian Albums (Nielsen SoundScan)	86
UK Independent Albums (Official Charts)	21
UK Rock & Metal Albums (Official Charts)	19
US Billboard 200	18
US Independent Albums (Billboard)	1
US Tastemaker Albums (Billboard)	13
US Top Alternative Albums (Billboard)	5
US Top Rock Albums (Billboard)	6
