= Can't Be Saved =

2006 single by Senses Fail

Single by Senses Fail

from the album Still Searching
- Released: February 26, 2007
- Recorded: 2006
- Genre: Emo
- Length: 3:07
- Label: Vagrant
- Songwriter(s): James "Buddy" Nielsen, Senses Fail
- Producer(s): Brian McTernan

Senses Fail singles chronology
"Calling All Cars" (2006)	"Can't Be Saved" (2007)	"Family Tradition" (2008)

Music video
- "Can't Be Saved" on YouTube

"Can't Be Saved" is the second single from Senses Fail's second album, Still Searching. The music video was first introduced through AOL Music on May 22, 2007. The song has been certified gold by the RIAA.

The song is included as a playable track in the video game Guitar Hero III: Legends of Rock. This song is also included in the hit game Tap Tap Revenge 2 for iPod Touch and iPhone.

The song was later included on Follow Your Bliss: The Best of Senses Fail.

== Music video ==
The music video, which revolves around a male high school student, begins with a presumably English teacher handing out a failing grade to the protagonist. Subsequently, he is shown being suspended from his lacrosse team. The video then displays shots of the athlete studying with a fellow student among clips of the athlete's presumed girlfriend and typical friends. The athlete begins to warm up to his student tutor, also male, despite social boundaries and the next paper handed to the protagonist displays a grade of "B+". The video concludes with a beach bonfire party, where the athlete and his student tutor are shown kissing each other in a secluded location.

The video was filmed at Canyon Crest Academy, a high school in San Diego, California.

== Certifications ==
Region	Certification	Certified units/sales
United States (RIAA)	Gold	500,000^{‡}
^{‡} Sales+streaming figures based on certification alone.
