= Family Tradition (Senses Fail song) =

Single by Senses Fail

from the album Life Is Not a Waiting Room
- A-side: "Family Tradition"
- Released: August 25, 2008
- Genre: Emo
- Length: 3:34
- Label: Vagrant
- Songwriters: James "Buddy" Nielsen, Senses Fail
- Producer: Brian McTernan

Senses Fail singles chronology
"Can't Be Saved" (2007)	"Family Tradition" (2008)	"Mi Amor" (2013)

Music video
- "Family Tradition" on YouTube

"Family Tradition" is the first single and fourth song on Senses Fail's third studio album Life Is Not a Waiting Room. Family Tradition is the seventh single released from Senses Fail. It has become one of the band's most successful singles to date. It was released on iTunes on August 26, 2008. "Family Tradition" was released to radio on October 7, 2008.

This song and others off the same album is featured in Senses Fail's greatest hits album entitled "Follow Your Bliss: The Best of Senses Fail".

Lead singer Buddy Nielsen discusses the story behind the song:

I find myself at times doing things to live up to other peoples expectations or cutting myself down because I assume that will make me look more humble to the world, so this song is one part a reaction to that and also about following the footsteps of a family member you don't really know but who has had a huge influence on you.

— Buddy Neilsen,

A music video had been filmed for the song displaying a rather scrawny young boy who does not seem to add up to his father's expectations. Constantly harassed by his older brother throughout the video, he enters a chest in his room only to come out in the form of a large gremlin-looking character. The video ends with the transformed son frightening his parents in their sleep. Scenes of the band playing the song in front of an audience in a tent are intercut with the storyline of the video.

== Track listing ==
1. "Family Tradition" – 3:34
2. "Wolves At the Door" – 3:27
3. "Life Is Not a Waiting Room" – 3:19
4. "Waiting Room Album Clips" – 4:20

== Personnel ==
- Buddy Nielsen – Vocals
- Garrett Zablocki – Lead Guitar, Vocals
- Dan Trapp – Drums, percussion
- Heath Saraceno – Guitar, Vocals
- Jason Black (from Hot Water Music) – Bass guitar
