= Still Searching =

Studio album by Senses Fail
- Released: October 10, 2006
- Recorded: May 2006
- Studios: Bearsville, Bearsville, New York
- Genres: Post-hardcore; emo; screamo
- Length: 40:43
- Label: Vagrant
- Producer: Brian McTernan

Senses Fail chronology
Let It Enfold You (2004)	Still Searching (2006)	Life Is Not a Waiting Room (2008)

Singles from Still Searching
- 1. "Calling All Cars" Released: September 12, 2006; 2. "Can't Be Saved" Released: February 26, 2007

Still Searching is the second studio album by American rock band Senses Fail, released October 10, 2006 through Vagrant Records. A month after the release of their debut studio album Let It Enfold You (2004), the band had enough material for their next album. Guitarist Heath Saraceno, formerly of Midtown replaced Dave Miller in late 2005. They spent the next several months writing more material and demoing songs. They recorded over six weeks from May 2006 with producer Brian McTernan at Bearsville Studios in Bearsville, New York. Still Searching is an emo, post-hardcore and screamo album, though it featured less screaming overall compared to past works. It is a concept album that follows a character dealing with faith, heartbreak, and depression.

Still Searching received generally favorable reviews from critics, some of whom praised Saraceno's addition to the band, while others commented on the variety of style incorporations. It peaked at number 15 on the Billboard 200 in the United States, selling over 49,000 copies in its first week. Prior to the album's release, the band spent a few months on the 2006 Warped Tour. "Calling All Cars" was released as the album's lead single in September 2006, which was promoted with an appearance on the international iteration of the Taste of Chaos tour. In early 2007, the band went on tours of the US and United Kingdom; "Can't Be Saved" was released as the album's second single in February 2007. After performing on the Zumiez Couch Tour, the band went on a co-headlining US tour with New Found Glory.

== Background ==
The group's debut album Let It Enfold You was released in September 2004, and was a commercial success, going on to sell over 650,000 copies. Within a month of release, the band had accumulated upwards of 12 songs for their next album. In September 2005, guitarist Heath Saraceno, formerly of Midtown, joined the band, replacing Dave Miller. Between November 2005 and May 2006, the band wrote material and demoed songs for their next album. They would spend 8–10 hours a day writing. Around this time, vocalist Buddy Nielsen stopped taking antidepressants and started suffering from major anxiety attacks. In an effort to distract himself, the band went on tour. However, he would have panic attacks onstage. With no improvement in his condition, he was prescribed anxiety medication. Despite it helping his nerves, it left him unable to be excited. During this period, Nielsen began thinking about his goals and regrets, and determined to write material based on both.

== Production ==
Senses Fail started pre-production with 14 tracks that required a little re-working; they spent two days re-arranging the songs and three days writing new ones. Still Searching was recorded at Bearsville Studios in Bearsville, New York with producer Brian McTernan. The studio is a converted barn, which the band lived in a house across from; sessions lasted over six weeks from May 2006. McTernan, who also engineered the sessions, was assisted by Chris Laidlaw and Chris Hansen. During some occasions, Nielsen had to stop recording due to his anxiety attacks. According to guitarist Garrett Zablocki, despite them owning a number of guitars, only two were used for recording: a 1978 Gibson Les Paul Custom and a 1991 Gibson Les Paul Standard.

Drummer Dan Tapp used a custom C&C drum kit throughout the recording, unlike when they made Let It Enfold You, where he used different pieces from several kits. Nielsen said McTernan helped find the sonic depth they had been looking for: "We don’t want the songs to be flat planes; we want movement." He named "All the Best Cowboys Have Daddy Issues" and "The Priest and the Matador" as two examples where McTernan "worked extremely hard to make them sound a certain way." Paul Leavitt and Saraceno did Pro Tools editing. Chris Lord-Alge mixed the recordings, with assistance from Keith Armstrong, at Resonate Music in Burbank, California. Ted Jensen then mastered the recordings at Sterling Sound. A 40-minute "making of" video of the album sessions was later released via Alternative Press.

== Composition ==
=== Overview ===
Musically, the album has been described as "tighter, fuller, and more honest" than its predecessor, Let It Enfold You. It has been categorized as emo, post-hardcore and screamo. According to Corey Apar of AllMusic, "The focus here is more on tense emo rock with a hard pop edge than scream-bloody-murder screamo. [...] the guttural shrieks are more purposefully integrated and less like crutches to fall back on." Additionally, the album incorporates elements of Southern rock and "traditional" emo. Some consider it to be a "scene album".

The writing process was more of a group effort compared to Let It Enfold You with every member contributing something. The group initially wanted to move away from the screaming metal-influenced sound of Let It Enfold You. However, after seeing the number of bands attempt to recreate Let It Enfold You musically, the group decided to simply build upon that sound. The band came up with 30–40 song ideas, and 25–30 of those were complete. According to guitarist Heath Saraceno, they ranged from cock rock to 1990s alternative rock to metal. The band demoed all of these and picked the ones they felt would make a cohesive record. Buddy Nielsen improved his singing and screaming technique since their debut, the latter evolving into a deep growl, though the album features less screaming overall.

The album's lyrics have been described as "distraught." According to Apar, "instead of killing exes, he explores the personal." Nielsen explaineded "I wrote a lot about my family … and the anger I had when I started to grow up. ... I'm really still searching for some sort of happiness or resolution to the things I've gone through." The record is a concept album, detailing the story of a character's battles with faith, heartbreak and depression. Describing his experience with sexuality and dissociation, Nielsen explained his "experiences with therapy had been a disaster", which would find its way into the album. Zablocki and Saraceno wanted to add another layer to their songs, and used digital audio workstations such as Reason 3.0, GarageBand and Pro Tools. These software programs were used to make samples and program additional instrumentation to develop the layers. Zablocki's playing was influenced by southern rock and blues acts he grew up on, namely Lynyrd Skynyrd, The Allman Brothers Band and Eric Clapton. He mentioned that having Saraceno in the group "definitely propelled" the number of lead parts featured in the songs. Nielsen also praised Saraceno, saying that he "really helped" mould a lot of the tracks, utilizing shredding.

=== Tracks ===
The opening track "The Rapture" begins with a space rock intro, before leading into "Bonecrusher", which sees Nielsen discuss his alcoholism. "Sick or Sane (Fifty for a Twenty)", which is the first track on the record to feature screaming, and "Shark Attack" both feature guitar solos. The first part of each solo would be played by Zablocki, and the remainder by Saraceno. "Can't Be Saved" deals with suicide and the need to end one's own life. It was musically reminiscent to "Buried a Lie", a track from their debut. "Calling All Cars" was reminiscent of Taking Back Sunday, specifically the Where You Want to Be (2004)-era.

The title-track is about struggling with depression, anxiety, going through therapy, and being on-and-off medication. The track's music was a went through the different areas of the group's sound, ranging from heavy parts to melodic parts, and incorporating gang vocals. "To All the Crowded Rooms" sees Nielsen harmonizing with Saraceno during the chorus sections. "All the Best Cowboys Have Daddy Issues" is an industrial-indebted track that opens with an electronic intro, which is then mimicked by the guitars. "Negative Space" is an interlude that repeats the same guitar line, eventually segueing into the closing track "The Priest and the Matador". Discussing the latter, Nielsen said the members were all fans of various instrumental acts and wanted to do their own take on a "beautiful, moving song."

== Release ==
On July 25, 2006, Still Searching was announced for release in three months' time. On August 4, 2006, the album's track listing and artwork were revealed. The artwork was created by James Rheem Davis. "Calling All Cars" was made available for streaming through AOL Radio on August 29, 2006. Shortly afterwards, the band filmed a music video for the track with director Jay Martin. On September 11, 2006, "Shark Attack" was posted on the band's Myspace profile. The following day, "Calling All Cars" was released as a single with "Stretch Your Legs to Coffin Length" as the B-side. "Calling All Cars" was released to Modern rock radio stations on September 19. On October 6, 2006, the "Calling All Cars" music video was released through AOL. That same day, Still Searching was made available for streaming through the group's Myspace, before being released four days later through Vagrant Records.

Some copies of Still Searching came with a making-of DVD. Best Buy and Target both had versions with their own exclusive bonus tracks; the former had acoustic versions of "Can't Be Saved", "Calling All Cars" and "Lost and Found", while the latter had "Cinco De Mayo" and a live version of the Let It Enfold You track "Lady in a Blue Dress". Wayne Pighini, Vagrant's head of marketing, said these companies were the two major retailers for the band, and the two that were the most successful with Let It Enfold You. On January 7, 2007, the band filmed a music video for "Can't Be Saved" at Canyon Crest Academy in San Diego, California. "Can't Be Saved" was released as a single on February 26, 2007. On March 1, 2007, the band held a contest for a fan to write the storyline for a music video for "The Priest and the Matador".

In early May 2007, the band filmed a music video for "The Priest and the Matador". On May 18, 2007, the "Can't Be Saved" music video premiered through AOL. The band had shot another video for it with Nielsen's mother Lisa Brown acting as a director but it was canned following miscommunication. They felt the story elements did not make any sense; the live footage was then repurposed for the final video. On October 9, 2007, a music video was released for "The Priest and the Matador". The band do not appear in the video, except for Nielsen who is arguing with a woman. A deluxe edition of Still Searching was released on November 13; "Battle Hymn" was posted online ahead of its release. It featured six bonus tracks (two originals that were recorded previously in August, three B-sides and a cover of the Cranberries song "Salvation") and a DVD with behind-the-scenes tour footage.

== Touring ==
Between mid-June and mid-August 2006, Senses Fail performed on the Warped Tour. They performed two sets: one on the main stage and an acoustic set on the Vagrant stage alongside other acts from the label. In September and October 2006, the band performed a handful of club shows. In October and November 2006, the group went on the international edition of the Taste of Chaos tour, visiting New Zealand, Australia, Japan and Europe. In November and December 2006, the band went on tour with Saosin, Bleeding Through, Drive By and I Am the Avalanche.

In January and February 2007, the band went on a US tour with Saosin, Alexisonfire, the Sleeping, and Set Your Goals. Following this, they went on a brief headlining UK tour with the Sleeping. From mid-February to early April 2007, Senses Fail went on the North American leg of the Taste of Chaos tour. Later in April 2007, the band performed in Europe as part of the Groezrock and Give it a Name festivals. In June 2007, the band headlined the Zumiez Couch Tour in the US, and went on tour with From Autumn to Ashes. In October and November 2007, Senses Fail went on a co-headlining tour of the US with New Found Glory. They were supported by Set Your Goals and the Receiving End of Sirens.

== Reception and legacy ==
Professional ratings
Review scores
Source	Rating
AbsolutePunk	75%
AllMusic	4/5 stars
Gigwise	9/10 stars
Melodic	3.5/5 stars
Sputnikmusic	4/5
Ultimate Guitar	7.7/10

Still Searching was met with generally favourable reviews from music critics. AbsolutePunk staff member Drew Beringer commented on the album's lyrics and musicianship, and concluding by saying it was "quite the improvement, and while it leaves some to be desired, it shows that Senses Fail are on the right path to fully discovering themselves". Kaj Roth of Melodic shared a similar sentiment, saying that they have "matured both lyrically and with song arrangements. The band feels more melodic but still with the same tight performance". The staff at Ultimate Guitar said the lyrics were a "mix of the impressive and mediocre" as some of the track themes "seem contrived and predictable, but then the next song could throw a curveball with some unique thoughts". Sputnikmusic staff member Atari said that "[n]ot only are the lyrics painfully honest, but the music is heavier as well".

Exclaim! writer Ariana Rock said the addition of Saraceno gave them a "fuller sound; shredding on the guitar, crowd sing-along, and a more layered and complex arrangement of sound". Gigwise's Shane Richardson added to this, stating that the band "have taken the prime cuts of emo, screamo and punk-rock and produced a genre-crossing gem of an album". Beringer felt with Saraceno the "musicianship, most notably the guitars, have improved tenfold, thus strengthening all thirteen songs". AllMusic reviewer Corey Apar praised the improvement of the album over its predecessor; "The focus here is more on tense emo rock with a hard pop edge than scream-bloody-murder screamo -- since there is less emphasis on screaming -- yet the music remains wholly Senses Fail". The staff at Ultimate Guitar found the band to have "plenty of promise when it doesn't stick to just the screamo genre".

Still Searching charted at number 15 on the Billboard 200 after selling over 49,000 copies in its first week. The songs "Can't Be Saved", "The Priest and the Matador", "Shark Attack", and "Calling All Cars" are featured on the band's greatest hits album Follow Your Bliss: The Best of Senses Fail, released in May 2012. In August of that year, Still Searching was released on vinyl. In March and April 2017, the group celebrated 15 years as a band with a tour where they played Still Searching in its entirety.

== Track listing ==
All songs written by Senses Fail, all lyrics written by Buddy Nielsen.

Standard edition
No.	Title	Length
1.	"The Rapture"	1:57
2.	"Bonecrusher"	2:33
3.	"Sick or Sane (Fifty for a Twenty)"	2:45
4.	"Can't Be Saved"	3:07
5.	"Calling All Cars"	3:23
6.	"Shark Attack"	2:54
7.	"Still Searching"	4:18
8.	"To All the Crowded Rooms"	3:05
9.	"Lost and Found"	3:50
10.	"Every Day Is a Struggle"	3:04
11.	"All the Best Cowboys Have Daddy Issues"	4:05
12.	"Negative Space"	1:22
13.	"The Priest and the Matador"	4:21
Total length:		40:43

Deluxe edition bonus tracks
No.	Title	Length
14.	"Battle Hymn"	3:43
15.	"Champagne"	3:23
16.	"Stretch Your Legs to Coffin Length"	3:02
17.	"Mason's Revenge"	4:26
18.	"Cinco De Mayo"	2:58
19.	"Salvation" (The Cranberries cover)	2:19

Best Buy bonus tracks
No.	Title	Length
14.	"Can't Be Saved (acoustic)"	3:07
15.	"Calling All Cars (acoustic)"	3:28
16.	"Lost and Found (acoustic)"	3:51

Target bonus tracks
No.	Title	Length
1.	"Cinco De Mayo"	3:02
2.	"Lady in a Blue Dress (live)"	3:20

== Personnel ==
Personnel per booklet.

Senses Fail

- Mike Glita – bass guitar, backing vocals
- Buddy Nielsen – lead vocals
- Dan Trapp – drums, backing vocals
- Heath Saraceno – rhythm guitar, backing vocals
- Garrett Zablocki – lead guitar, backing vocals

Production

- Brian McTernan – producer, engineer
- Chris Lord-Alge – mixing
- Paul Leavitt – Pro Tools editing
- Heath Saraceno – Pro Tools editing
- Chris Laidlaw – assistant recording engineer
- Chris Hansen – assistant recording engineer
- Keith Armstrong – assistant mix engineer
- Ted Jensen – mastering
- James Rheem Davis – album artwork

== Charts ==
Chart performance for Still Searching
Chart (2006)	Peak position
Australian Hitseekers Albums (ARIA)	8
Canadian Albums (Nielsen SoundScan)	55
UK Albums (Official Charts)	150
UK Independent Albums (Official Charts)	9
UK Rock & Metal Albums (Official Charts)	10
US Billboard 200	15
US Independent Albums (Billboard)	2
US Tastemaker Albums (Billboard)	9
US Top Rock Albums (Billboard)	7
