= Senses Fail =

American post-hardcore band

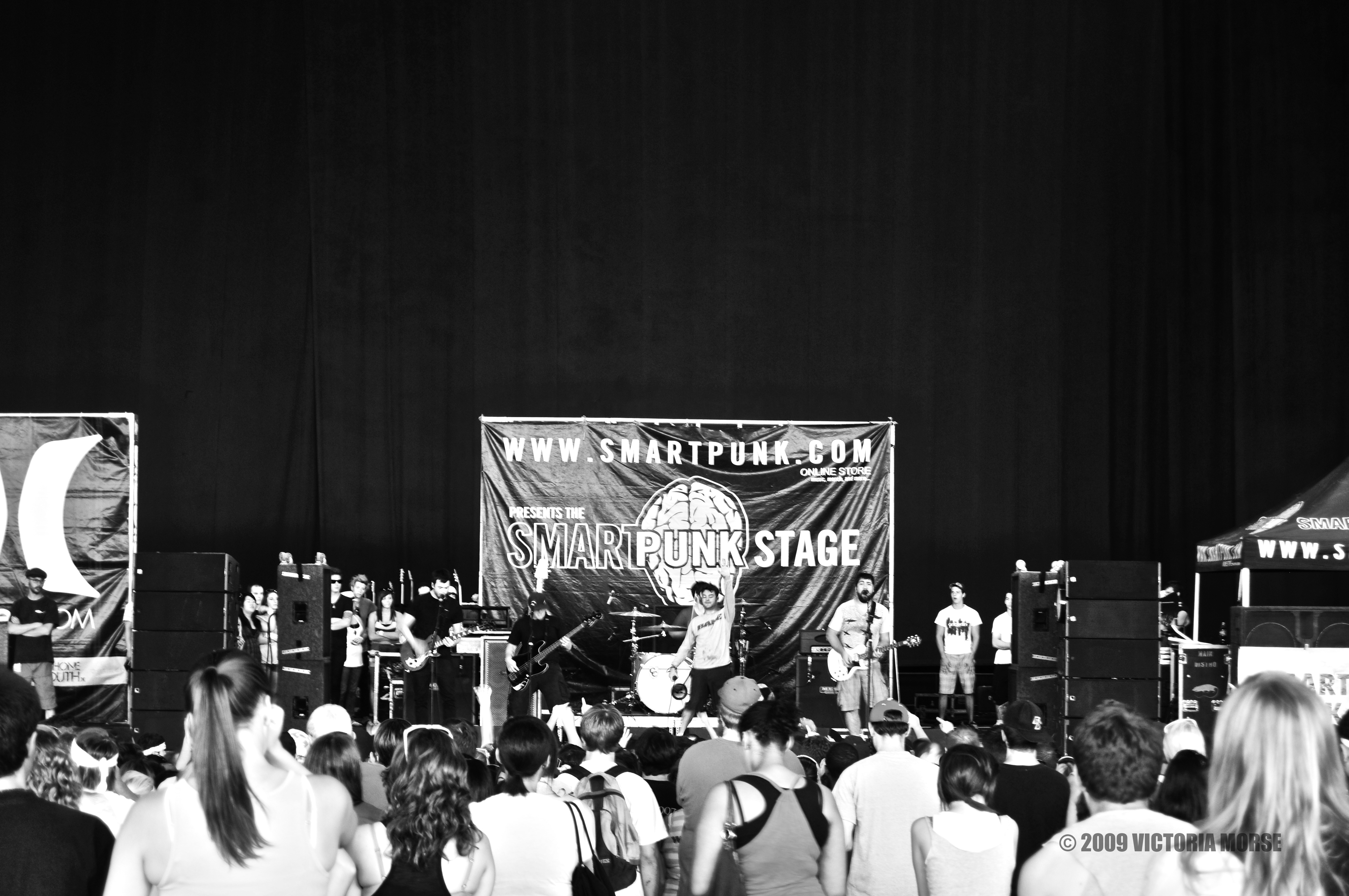
- Senses Fail performing at Warped Tour in 2009

Background information
- Origin: Ridgewood, New Jersey, U.S.
- Genres: Emo; pop screamo; post-hardcore; screamo
- Years active: 2001–present
- Labels: ECA; Drive-Thru; Vagrant; Hassle; Staple; Pure Noise
- Members: Buddy Nielsen; Gavin Caswell; Steve Carey; Daniel Wonacott
- Past members: Garrett Zablocki; Dan Trapp; James Gill; Mike Glita; Dave Miller; Heath Saraceno; Jason Black; Zack Roach; Matt Smith; Chris Hornbrook; Greg Styliades; Jason Milbank
- Website: sensesfail.com

Senses Fail is an American post-hardcore band formed in Ridgewood, New Jersey, in 2001. Founded by vocalist Buddy Nielsen, drummer Dan Trapp, guitarists Garrett Zablocki and Dave Miller, and bassist James Gill (replaced by Mike Glita shortly after); the band has seen many lineup changes, with Nielsen being the only consistent member. The band has released eight studio albums, one live album, and several EPs.

== History ==
=== Formation and From the Depths of Dreams EP (2001–2003) ===
Senses Fail's beginnings started in October 2001 after James "Buddy" Nielsen posted an advertisement on the Internet to recruit members for the band. The advertisement attracted attention from Garrett Zablocki, who then began writing with Nielsen. Later Zablocki contacted Dave Miller to join the band who also brought along his friend, James Gill. After a short time with another drummer the band came across Dan Trapp, who was only 14-years-old at the time. Before the band signed to Drive-Thru Records, James Gill was kicked out of the band due to irreconcilable differences; he was replaced by former Tokyo Rose drummer Mike Glita.

Nielsen explained the band name, stating: "In Hinduism, they believe that being alive is hell, and the only way to reach Nirvana is to ultimately have no attachments to anything. So, people go out and live in the middle of the woods and they don't eat and don't drink. They just meditate because they've reached such a high level where they're not attached to love, relationships or anything. And if you want to reach the highest level of being and see God, you have to have all your senses fail."

Under the guidance of their first manager and then local promoter, Heath Miller, the band built a local fan base by playing any gig they could find, from skate parks (Rexplex) and clubs such as Club Krome & to churches, they soon entered the studio and started to record. Their first release, From the Depths of Dreams, was a six-track EP that was originally released on ECA Records on August 16, 2002. It originally started as two three-song demo CDs, but was later joined together to make one release by producer John Naclerio. The independent release did very well and caught the attention of some record labels. They signed to Drive-Thru Records, and reissued their EP on April 29, 2003, with two extra tracks, remastering, and new cover art. The b-side "Bastard Son" was also recorded during this time. The release saw much success, and sold enough copies to peak at No. 144 on the Billboard chart. In support of the EP, Senses Fail toured with such bands as The Used, Millencolin, The Starting Line, and Drive-Thru labelmates Finch.

=== Let It Enfold You (2004–2005) ===
Senses Fail started working on their debut album, Let It Enfold You in April 2003. During this time, lead singer and songwriter Buddy Nielsen was 18–19 years old. They worked with producer Steve Evetts (Saves the Day, A Static Lullaby, Every Time I Die) on their new label Vagrant Records. The lyrics were derived from a wide variety of sources. The title of the album was taken from a poem written by Charles Bukowski, the song "Irony of Dying on Your Birthday" is about the work of mythologist Joseph Campbell, and parts of the song "Slow Dance" include lines of the Dao De Jing. Nielsen stated that, "We just love making music and writing good songs. I feel like I've got a lot more to say and we've got a lot more to contribute. But even if things ended tomorrow, we've gotten 10 times further than we ever expected to get and that makes us feel like we've succeeded regardless of what happens from here on." Let It Enfold You was released on September 7, 2004, on Vagrant and Drive Thru Records. The album was certified gold by the RIAA, and has sold over 600,000 copies worldwide.

Let It Enfold You saw the release of two singles: "Buried a Lie" and "Rum Is for Drinking, Not for Burning." The music video for "Buried a Lie" was filmed on the set of the soap opera Guiding Light. Nielsen's mother, who shot the video, used to act in the show. The release of the video started attracting mainstream success for the band. During this period, Senses Fail were featured in magazines such as Kerrang!, Rolling Stone, Spin and appeared on the cover of Alternative Press.

The band toured extensively in support of the release. They were added to Warped Tour in 2004, 2005, and 2006, and 2009, and played on the main stage for the 2005 and 2006 editions of the tour. They were also included on the first Taste of Chaos tour in 2005 with such notable acts as The Used, My Chemical Romance, and Killswitch Engage. They also headlined a few tours of their own during this time with The Early November from Drive Thru and Emanuel from Vagrant.

The band performed on Conan O'Brien's show in early 2005. Nielsen forgot the lyrics to the first verse of "Rum is for Drinking, Not for Burning" during this performance due to a panic attack.

The album was reissued in November 2005 with bonus tracks and new album art. In addition to the original track listing, it featured acoustic versions of songs from the album, an unreleased track, and a cover of the Suicidal Tendencies song "Institutionalized."

In 2005, the band's web site announced the departure, by mutual agreement, of guitarist Dave Miller. He was replaced by Heath Saraceno, previously the guitarist and vocalist of the band Midtown. Miller started his own record label called DMI (Dave Miller Industries) in September 2006.

The song "Lady in a Blue Dress," from this album, was released as a downloadable track on the Rock Band Network on March 4, 2010.

=== Still Searching (2006–2007) ===
After taking a break from touring, and acquiring a new lineup, Senses Fail began to write their second studio album. The new album, titled Still Searching was produced by Brian McTernan (Thrice, Cave In) and mixed by Chris Lord-Alge. This album eased up on the aggression on previous albums and showed more emotion. On the subject of the new songs, Nielsen explained, "I like my lyrics to be open to interpretation, but I didn't want to paint pictures of things no one was going to understand; I want our fans to be able to relate. At some point, we all start examining our lives. If you don't, there's something wrong with you."

In support of the new album, the band toured on the Taste of Chaos again. In 2006 they toured with the Taste of Chaos International, and in 2007 Senses Fail returned to North America for the 2007 Taste of Chaos tour. In the summer of 2007 they also participated in a few dates of the Zumiez Couch Tour alongside From Autumn to Ashes. They headlined in late 2006 with Saosin and Bleeding Through as supporters. On October 5, 2007, Senses Fail began a 33-city co-headlining tour with New Found Glory which started in Las Vegas, Nevada. Also on the tour was Set Your Goals. The tour ended on November 24, 2007, in San Diego, California.

On November 13, 2007, Senses Fail released a deluxe version of Still Searching, which featured new art, behind-the-scenes DVD featuring footage from the band's headlining tour last fall, two new songs, three b-sides, and a cover of The Cranberries' song "Salvation."

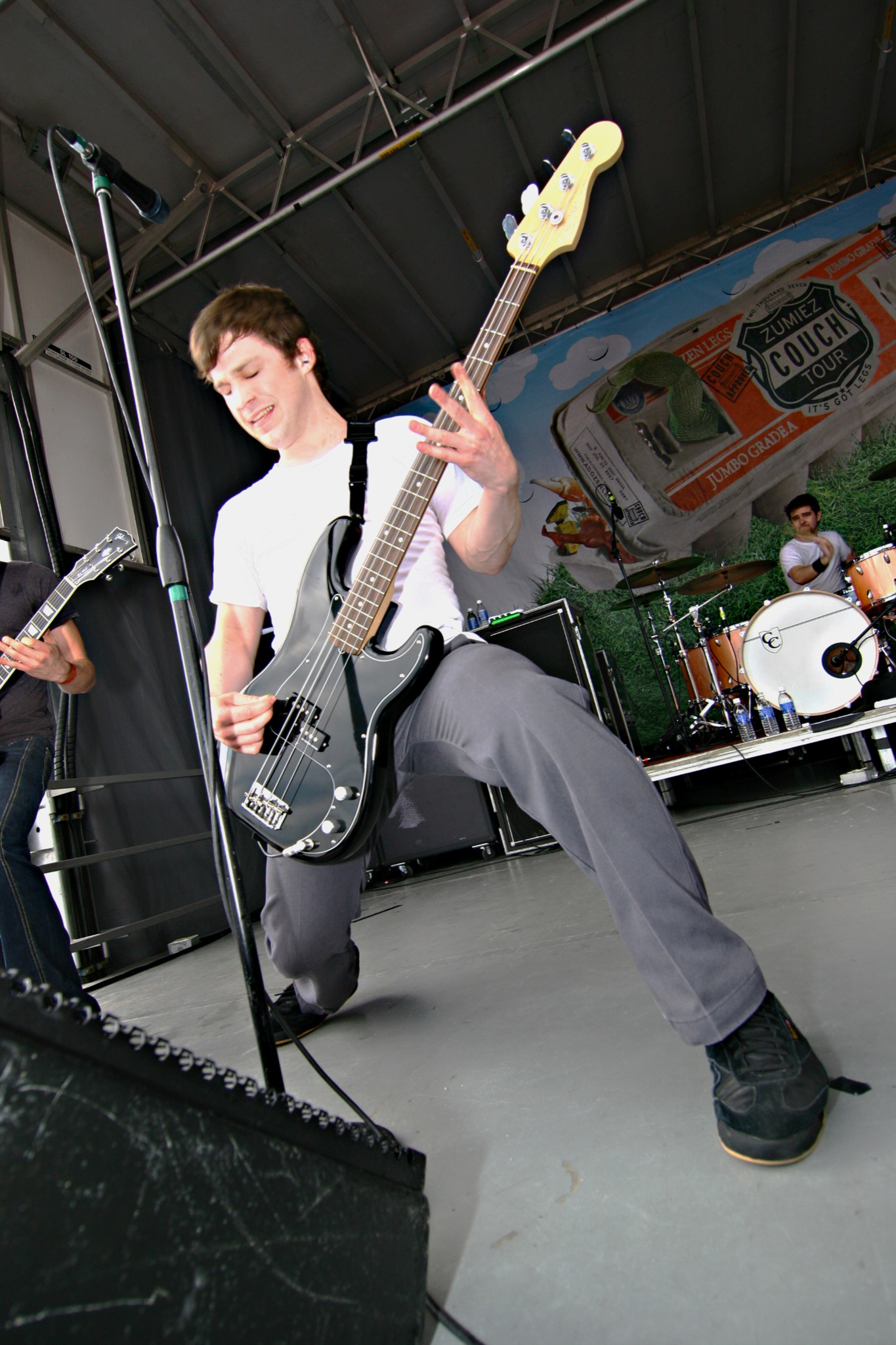
Former bassist and backing vocalist Mike Glita in 2007.

On December 8, 2007, bassist Mike Glita left the band to pursue his side project Knights In Paris. Jason Black joined as a temporary replacement, though he later became a permanent member.

The song "Can't Be Saved," from this album, is featured in the game Guitar Hero III: Legends of Rock. One of their other singles, "Calling All Cars," is featured in the game Burnout Paradise.

=== Life Is Not a Waiting Room (2008–2009) ===
The band's third full-length album Life Is Not a Waiting Room was released on October 7, 2008 through Vagrant Records, and was followed by a nationwide tour the day after. On November 21, Senses Fail did an online interview with Ultimate Guitar, talking about the evolution of the band, their new bassist and the album.

On June 30, 2009, it was announced that guitarist Heath Saraceno would be leaving the band after the 2009 Warped Tour, stating: "I've shared many great times with these guys over the past four years or so. We've made two records I'm very proud of, toured the world and the States countless times, and I've made friends with people I would not have met otherwise. These guys from Jersey (and Atlanta by way of Florida) have turned into some of my closest friends, and I will miss seeing them as often as I've been able to." He was replaced by Zack Roach.

=== The Fire (2010) ===
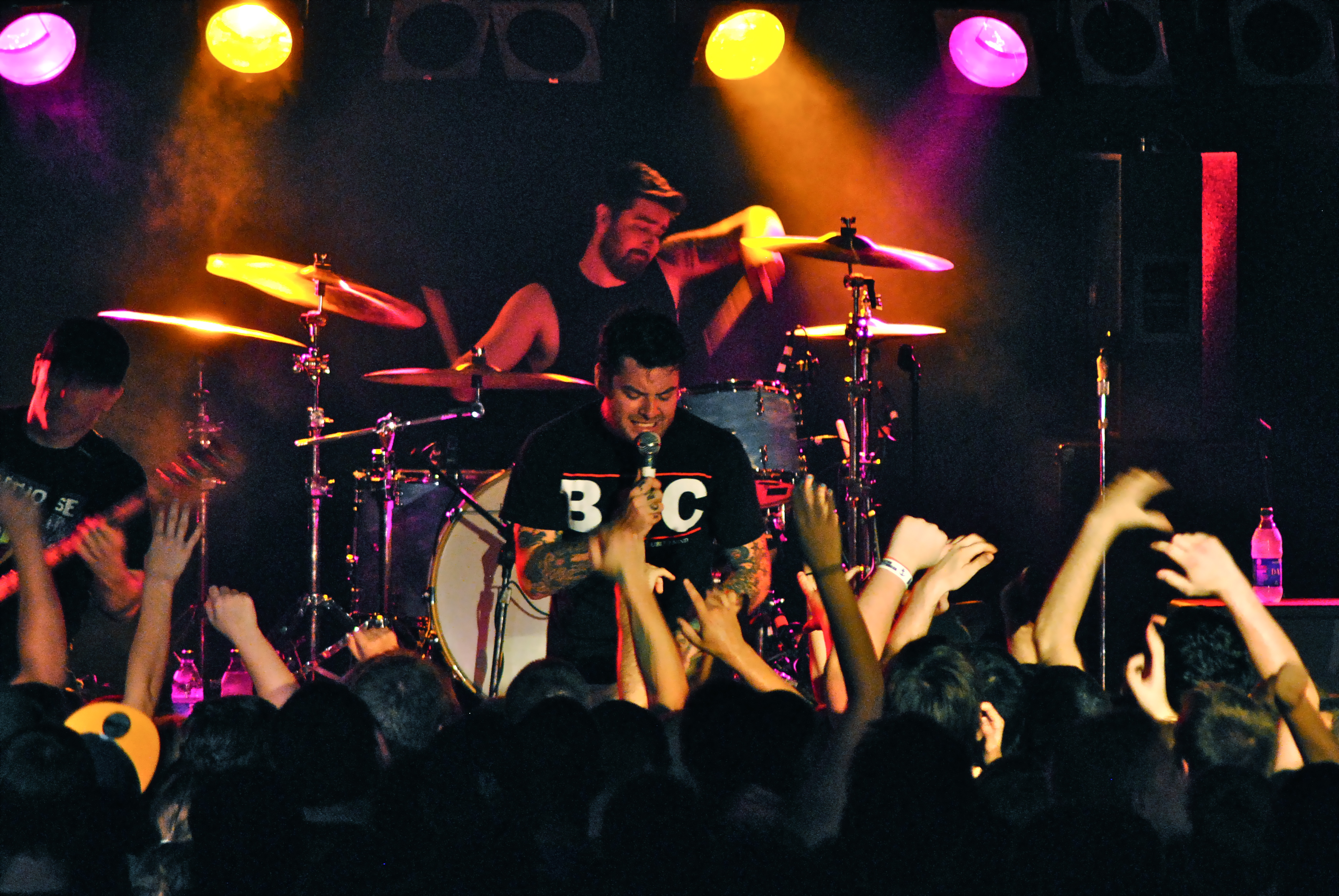
Senses Fail in 2011

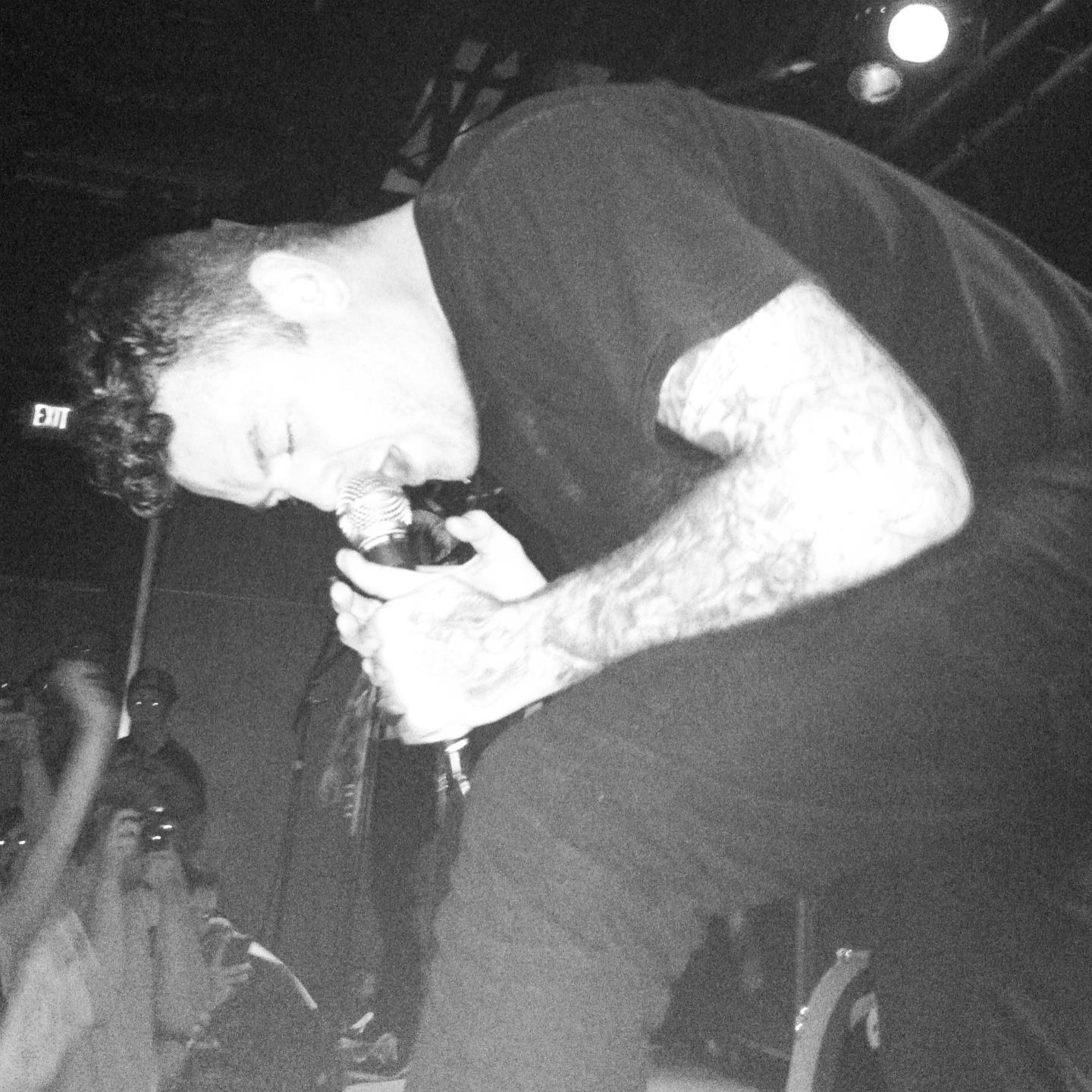
Buddy Nielsen performing at the Social in April 2013

The band began recording their new album, titled The Fire, at Salad Days Studio with Brian McTernan in June 2010 hoping to release later that year. The Fire was released in the UK on October 25, 2010, through Hassle Records and elsewhere on October 26 through Vagrant Records to generally positive reviews. The album does not feature Zack Roach on guitar, replacing Heath Saraceno after leaving in 2009, but instead has Garrett Zablocki playing both guitar roles. In February 2011, Garrett Zablocki left the band to attend college; however, he will be composing music for various films and videos.

=== Follow Your Bliss: The Best of Senses Fail (2012) ===
Senses Fail announced that they would be going on tour with Stick to Your Guns, Make Do and Mend, and The Story So Far in November 2011.

The band then released The Fire on vinyl through Mightier Than Sword Records.

Senses Fail played again on the 2012 Vans Warped Tour. They released a greatest hits album entitled Follow Your Bliss: The Best of Senses Fail which featured music from all of their previous albums and came with an added four-track EP of new songs. The album was released on June 19, 2012, in a double-CD package and it is limited to 10,000 copies.

On June 15, they released "War Paint" from their Greatest Hits album.

=== Renacer (2013–2014) ===
On November 13, 2012, Senses Fail posted on their Facebook page that "We begin recording our fifth full-length album this week in Los Angeles, California. We will be working with producer Shaun Lopez (Far, Deftones) at The Airport Studio and Red Bull Studio. The recording is expected to wrap up in mid-December with a Spring 2013 release planned." The resulting album, Renacer, was released on March 26, 2013. On February 4, 2013, the first single, "Mi Amor" was released, along with pre-orders for the album. On March 1, 2013, a second single was released, "The Path."

The band played at the UK Slam Dunk Festival in May 2013.

The music video for "Between the Mountains and the Sea" was released on August 2, 2013.

It was announced on June 2, 2014, via the band's Facebook page that Senses Fail would be doing a 10th Anniversary tour playing their record "Let It Enfold You" from start to finish and that ex-Poison the Well, current Big Black Delta live drummer, Chris Hornbrook would be replacing long time drummer, Dan Trapp.

=== Pull the Thorns from Your Heart, touring replacements, side projects (2014–2016) ===
On February 2, 2015, the band released a tease of their split EP on their Facebook. The EP was released on March 3, 2015. Pull the Thorns from Your Heart was released on June 30, 2015. The touring cycle for the record kicked off by playing the entirety of the 2015 Vans Warped Tour. The band then embarked on a winter co-headlining tour with Silverstein. On this tour, guitarist Matt Smith was absent due to the birth of his first child. Greg Styliades, who had previously toured with the band after Zack Roach returned home for the birth of his child, performed with the band on this tour. At this time, the band was classified by AbsolutePunk as screamo and "alternative".

On May 17, 2016, frontman Buddy Nielsen announced that he had formed a new band called Speak The Truth... Even If Your Voice shakes. The band also includes drummer Alex Pappas and guitarists Alex "Grizz" Linares and Daniel Wonacott, all formerly of the band Finch. They released their debut, self-titled 7" on November 4, 2016, via Bad Timing Records. The release features the songs Crash My Car and Go For The Throat. Senses Fail bassist Gavin Caswell was later recruited to play bass at the outfits first ever live performance.

In 2016, the band performed at the recently revived Taste of Chaos festival in San Bernardino, California. After returning as a single day festival in 2015, Taste of Chaos returned as a full United States tour in 2016, culminating in the festival date. The festival took place on July 16, and also featured performances from The Starting Line, The Get Up Kids, and Quicksand, as well as 2016 Taste of Chaos full tour acts Saosin, Taking Back Sunday, and Dashboard Confessional.

The future of the band was left uncertain after it was revealed that guitarists Zack Roach and Matt Smith would no longer be touring with the band, with both choosing to focus on their families after the recent births of their children. Despite almost breaking up, the band took the rest of the summer of 2016 off to regroup. In late 2016, the band supported Sum 41 on their "Don't Call it a Sum Back" full United States tour. Bassist Gavin Caswell took over rhythm guitar duties live, with Styliades returning on bass guitar, and Jason Milbank filling the role of lead guitarist.

=== In Your Absence, Quince Años Tour and If There Is Light, It Will Find You (2016–2019) ===
On November 15, 2016, the band announced that in celebration of its upcoming fifteenth anniversary, they would be embarking on the Quince Años Tour in March and April 2017, with support from Counterparts, Movements, and Like Pacific. To commemorate the event, the band performed its 2006 album Still Searching in full, alongside a collection of career spanning songs.

On the same day, the band announced the release of their long teased acoustic EP, In Your Absence. It featured three brand new songs recorded and produced by Beau Burchell, alongside acoustic renditions of "Lost and Found" from Still Searching, and "Family Tradition" from Life Is Not A Waiting Room recorded and produced by Kyle Black. A music video was released for the lead single, "Jets to Peru", on January 26, 2017. The EP released on March 3, 2017, alongside the beginning of the Quince Años Tour.

The band entered the studio with Saosin guitarist Beau Burchell, who also handled recording duties on In Your Absence, to begin recording their seventh full-length album on June 27, 2017, to be titled If There Is Light, It Will Find You. Nielsen commented that the album would feature a style more akin to earlier releases, such as Let It Enfold You.

On August 2, it was revealed that former drummer Dan Trapp would be performing drums on the album, although current drummer Chris Hornbrook would still be performing and touring with the band. However, on January 8, 2018, Hornbrook announced his departure from the band. Hornbrook had been touring with Dhani Harrison during the recording sessions. On February 1, 2018, Steve Carey of The Color Morale was announced as the band's new drummer, following the announcement that The Color Morale would be entering a hiatus.

On November 30, the lead single "Double Cross" was released. A second single, "Gold Jacket, Green Jacket..." was released on January 11, 2018. On February 1, 2018, a third single, "New Jersey Makes, the World Takes" was released. The album was released on February 16, 2018.

On August 29, 2019, a re-recorded version of 2004's "Bastard Son" was released with a video, and the band announced the release date of a "reimagined" From the Depths of Dreams EP on September 6, 2019.

=== Hell Is in Your Head (2020–present) ===
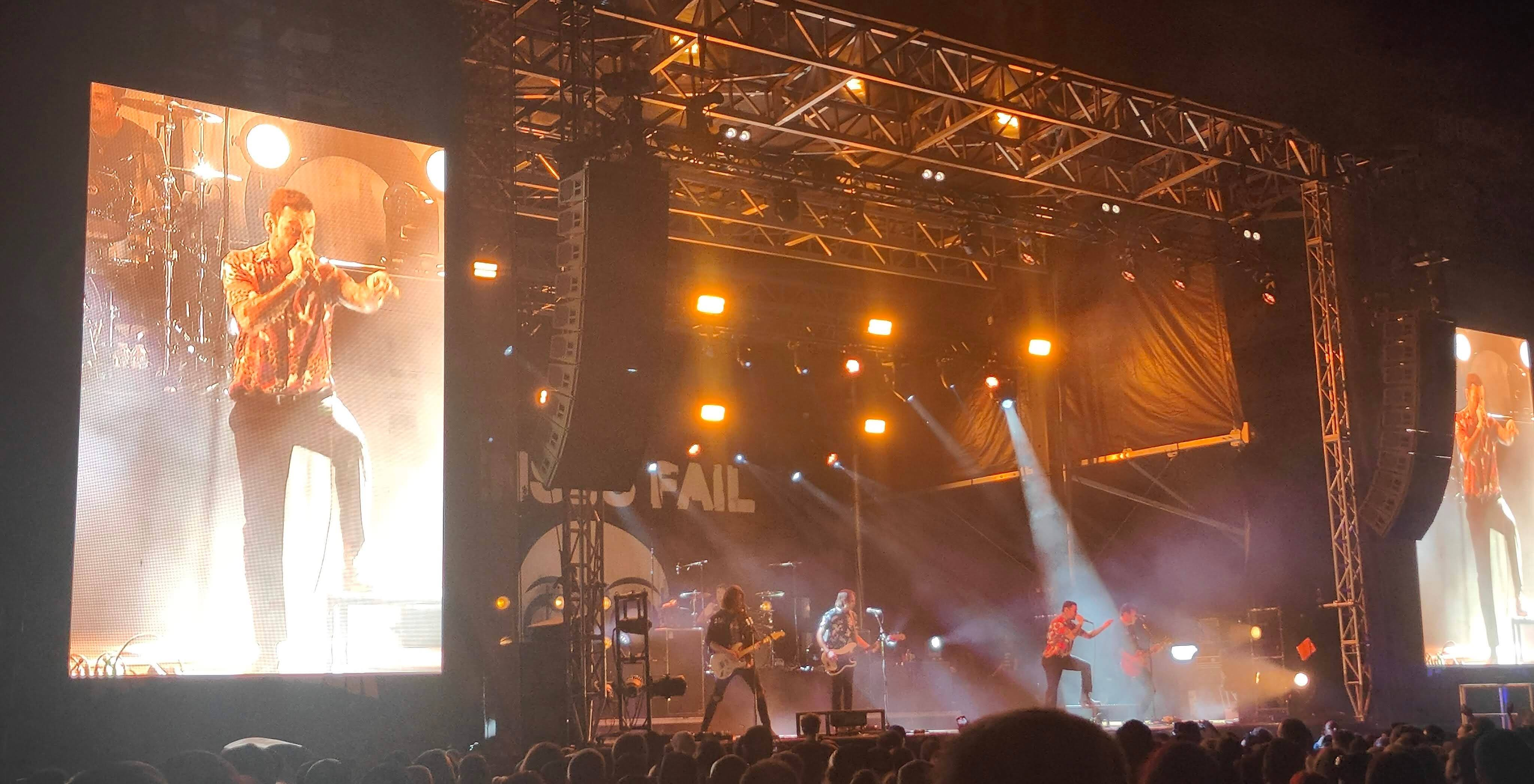
Senses Fail playing at Aftershock 2023

In January 2020, Senses Fail announced that they had begun recording their eighth record, tentatively titled Hell Is In Your Head, and that it would follow the character from Still Searching after the events of the song "The Priest and the Matador." In March, they updated the working title to What the Thunder Said, Hell Is in Your Head.

On October 30, 2020, two Misfits covers were released as part of a split covers EP with the band Saves the Day titled Through Being Ghoul. On November 25, 2020, the band released an EP titled Christmas Has Been Canceled Due to Lack of Hustle which features two songs, a cover of Saturday Night Live's "I Wish It Was Christmas Today" and "Donde Esta Santa Clause".

On February 17, 2021, the band released "Lush Rimbaugh," coinciding with the death of conservative news pundit Rush Limbaugh. On August 18, a second single titled "Death by Water" was released alongside a music video, and featured Ice Nine Kills vocalist Spencer Charnas. On November 4, 2021, another new single was released alongside a music video titled "I'm Sorry I'm Leaving." The release of the song also saw the official announcement that Hell Is in Your Head would be released on July 15, 2022.

In September 2022, it was announced that bassist Greg Styliades would be only a part time touring member of the band so he could focus on his real estate career and raising his family.

Senses Fail were listed as a band to watch on day 1 of the 2023 Aftershock Festival by The State Hornet.

The band was confirmed to be performing at the 2026 Sonic Temple music festival in Columbus, Ohio. The band are also confirmed to be making an appearance at Welcome to Rockville, which will take place in Daytona Beach, Florida in May 2026.

In June 2026, after having not played at any Senses Fail shows since their performances at the Emo's Not Dead Cruise in January 2026, lead guitarist Jason Milbank announced his departure from the band, and according to a band photo released at the same time, the band will continue on as a four-piece.

On June 23, 2026, the band announced a 21-date North American headlining tour with Koyo and Initiate to celebrate the 20th anniversary of their album Still Searching, where the album will be performed in its entirety on the tour.

== Musical style and influences ==
Senses Fail's traditional sound is characterized by "a slick amalgam of post-hardcore muscle and emo heartbreak," along with "unusually esoteric" lyrics. In addition to post-hardcore and emo, the band has also been categorized as screamo, metalcore, pop screamo, pop-punk, and hardcore punk, and punk rock. According to AllMusic, "Unlike many bands flying punk's pirate flag in the early '00s, Senses Fail don't go in for the jokey pop-punk sound favored by so many of their peers (especially on the West Coast). Nor do they trade in the ubiquitous emo sound, or Rancid-style retro. Instead they pursue their own course; while melodic, they don't go for obvious pop hooks." According to Alternative Press, "The band exquisitely balance their post-hardcore and metalcore elements by providing ample attention to each aspect of the genres."

Nielsen's vocal style utilizes both screaming and singing, drawing influence from hardcore punk, emo and pop music. He has retroactively self-described his lyrics on early Senses Fail releases as misogynistic. He said: "There are definitely things I said on there that I’d never say now. Specifically, sort of misogynistic, overtly misogynistic things. Songs just that lack a level of depth. Overall, there’s a couple lines where I’ll cringe, like 'whore.' Or I have a song about pushing a girl off a building. [...] I wouldn’t say when I look at it as a whole I’m, like, cringing or upset about it. But there are specific instances when I look at it, and I’m like, 'What? What was going on back then that that’s what came out?'"

The band have cited Grade, Grayarea, Poison the Well, Planes Mistaken for Stars, Saetia, Pg. 99, Hot Water Music, Cursive, Orchid, American Nightmare, Bane, Turning Point, Jimmy Eat World, the Get Up Kids, the Promise Ring, Appleseed Cast, Saves the Day, Thursday, the Casket Lottery, Lifetime, Metallica, Megadeth and Deftones as their influences.

== Personal life and ideology ==
Frontman Buddy Nielsen has stated that he has struggled with anxiety, sexual addiction, substance abuse and alcoholism at earlier periods in his life. He identifies as queer and has stated he has found himself attracted to people of all gender identities. He has been an outspoken proponent for LGBT rights in the United States, healthcare reform and socialism. He is married and has a daughter and a son. His wife has multiple sclerosis, which nearly cost her life during childbirth.

Nielsen practices Buddhist meditation and ju jitsu. In a 2012 Warped Tour interview with BryanStars, Nielsen stated that he did not believe in God or heaven.

== Band members ==
Current

- James "Buddy" Nielsen – lead vocals, piano, programming, additional percussion (2002–present)
- Gavin Caswell – lead guitar (2026–present); rhythm guitar, backing vocals (2016–present); bass (2013–2016)
- Steve Carey – drums (2018–present)
- Daniel Wonacott – bass, backing vocals, part-time guitar (2022–present)

Former

- Garrett Zablocki – lead guitar, backing vocals (2002–2011)
- Dan Trapp – drums, percussion (2002–2014 official, 2017–present session)
- Mike Glita – bass, backing vocals (2002–2008)
- Dave Miller – rhythm guitar (2002–2005)
- James Gill – bass (2002)
- Heath Saraceno – rhythm guitar, backing vocals (2005–2009)
- Jason Black – bass (2008–2012)
- Zack Roach – rhythm guitar (2009–2011); lead guitar (2011–2016); backing vocals (2009–2016); bass (2012–2013); died 2026
- Matt Smith – rhythm guitar, backing vocals (2011–2016)
- Chris Hornbrook – drums (2014–2018)
- Greg Styliades – bass (2016–2022 official, 2022–present part-time/touring); rhythm guitar (2015 touring)
- Jason Milbank – lead guitar, backing vocals (2016–2026)

Former touring musicians

- Etay Pisano – rhythm guitar (2009–2010)
- Jeremy Comitas – bass, backing vocals (2012)

Timeline

== Discography ==
Studio albums

- Let It Enfold You (2004)
- Still Searching (2006)
- Life Is Not a Waiting Room (2008)
- The Fire (2010)
- Renacer (2013)
- Pull the Thorns from Your Heart (2015)
- If There Is Light, It Will Find You (2018)
- Hell Is in Your Head (2022)
