= ECA Records =

Record label

ECA Records.
- Industry: Music & Entertainment
- Headquarters: New York, NY, U.S. US
- Website: http://www.ecarecords.com/

ECA Records is a record label based in New York City. Its most notable artists are The Number 12 Looks Like You and its alumni artist Senses Fail, of whom they released the debut EP.

== Artists ==
This list was compiled based on the label's website and other sources.

=== Active artists ===
- Christians & Lions
- Ramona Cordova
- Denver in Dallas
- Kay Kay and His Weathered Underground
- The Lido Venice
- The Number 12 Looks Like You
- Tunnel of Love
- Weatherbox
- Zulu Pearls
- Jason Anderson
- Dave Conway
- Pascalle
- The Prize Fight

=== Alumni ===
- Senses Fail
- There for Tomorrow
- Weatherbox

== See also ==
- List of record labels
