= The Used discography =

American rock band

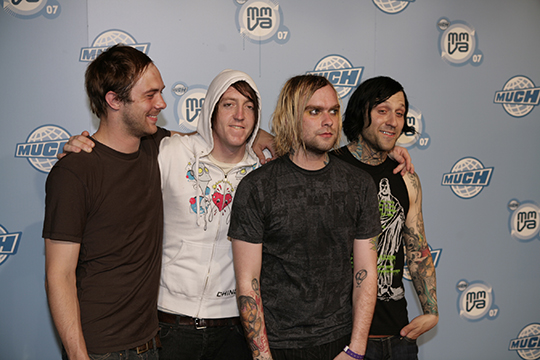
- The Used, from left to right: Quinn Allman, Dan Whitesides, Bert McCracken and Jeph Howard
- Studio albums: 9
- Extended plays: 3
- Live albums: 2
- Compilation albums: 2
- Singles: 26
- Video albums: 3
- Music videos: 32
- Demo albums: 1

The discography of the Used, an American rock band, consists of nine studio albums, two live albums, two compilation albums, three extended plays, one demo, three video albums, twenty-six singles and thirty-two music videos. After releasing their eponymous debut album in 2002, the Used become one of the leaders of their era and have enjoyed much success with many of their albums being certified gold and platinum by the RIAA and selling over 10 million albums combined worldwide.

== Albums ==
=== Studio albums ===
List of studio albums, with selected chart positions and certifications
Title	Album details	Peak chart positions										Certifications
Title	Album details	US	AUS	AUT	CAN	GER	NLD	NZ	SCO	SWE	UK	Certifications
The Used	Released: June 25, 2002 (US); Label: Reprise; Formats: CD, CS, LP, digital download	63	34	—	192	87	—	—	—	—	—	RIAA: Platinum; ARIA: Gold; BPI: Silver; MC: Gold
In Love and Death	Released: September 28, 2004 (US); Label: Reprise; Formats: CD, LP, digital download	6	32	—	4	—	100	—	—	—	106	RIAA: Platinum; ARIA: Gold; BPI: Silver; MC: Platinum
Lies for the Liars	Released: May 22, 2007 (US); Label: Reprise; Formats: CD, CD+DVD, LP, digital download	5	5	48	7	61	—	38	45	—	39	RIAA: Gold; MC: Gold
Artwork	Released: August 31, 2009 (US); Label: Reprise; Formats: CD, CD+DVD, LP, digital download	10	17	—	10	—	—	—	97	—	63	
Vulnerable	Released: March 26, 2012 (US); Label: Hopeless; Formats: CD, LP, digital download	8	18	—	21	—	—	—	—	58	65	
Imaginary Enemy	Released: April 1, 2014 (US); Label: Hopeless; Formats: CD, LP, digital download	14	12	—	—	—	—	—	—	—	78	
The Canyon	Released: October 27, 2017; Label: Hopeless; Formats: CD, LP, digital download	50	69	—	—	—	—	—	—	—	—	
Heartwork	Released: April 24, 2020; Label: Big Noise; Formats: CD, LP, digital	87	—	—	—	—	—	—	68	—	—	
Toxic Positivity	Released: May 19, 2023; Label: Big Noise; Formats: CD, LP, digital	—	—	—	—	—	—	—	—	—	—	

=== Live albums ===
List of live albums, with selected chart positions and certifications
Title	Album details	Peak chart positions					Certifications
Title	Album details	US	US Rock	AUS	CAN	UK	Certifications
Berth	Released: February 6, 2007 (US); Label: Reprise; Formats: CD+DVD, digital download	71	16	39	29	177	RIAA: Gold
Live & Acoustic at the Palace	Released: April 1, 2016 (US); Label: Hopeless; Formats: CD+DVD, LP+DVD, digital download	30	—	—	—	—	

=== Compilation albums ===
List of compilation albums, with selected chart positions and certifications
Title	Album details	Peak chart positions			Certifications
Title	Album details	US	AUS	CAN	Certifications
Maybe Memories	Released: July 15, 2003 (US); Label: Warner Reprise, Reprise; Formats: CD+DVD, digital download	84	95	133	RIAA: Platinum
Medz	Released: June 21, 2024; Label: Big Noise; Formats: CD, LP, digital	—	—	—	

=== Video albums ===
List of video albums, with selected chart positions and certifications
Title	Album details	Peak chart positions					Certifications
Title	Album details	US	US Rock	AUS	CAN	UK	Certifications
Maybe Memories	Released: July 15, 2003 (US); Label: Warner Reprise, Reprise; Formats: CD+DVD	84	—	95	133	—	RIAA: Platinum
Berth	Released: February 6, 2007 (US); Label: Reprise; Formats: CD+DVD	71	16	39	29	177	RIAA: Gold
Live & Acoustic at the Palace	Released: April 1, 2016 (US); Label: Hopeless; Formats: CD+DVD, LP+DVD	30	—	—	—	—	

=== Demos ===
Title	Album details
USED (often referred to by fans as Demos from the Basement)	Released: June 2001; Label: Self-released; Formats: CD-R

== Extended plays ==
List of extended plays
Title	Extended play details
Shallow Believer	Released: February 18, 2008 (US); Label: Reprise; Formats: LP, digital download
The Ocean of the Sky	Released: July 9, 2013 (US); Label: Hopeless; Formats: CD, LP, digital download
Live from Maida Vale	Released: April 13, 2019; Label: Hopeless; Formats: LP

== Singles ==
Single	Year	Peak chart positions									Album
Single	Year	US	US Alt.	US Main. Rock	US Pop	US Rock	AUS	SCO	UK	UK Rock	Album
"The Taste of Ink"	2002	—	19	—	—	—	—	57	52	3	The Used
"Buried Myself Alive"	2003	—	13	—	—	—	—	—	—	—	The Used
"Blue and Yellow"	2003	—	23	—	—	—	—	—	—	—	The Used
"Take It Away"	2004	—	13	—	—	—	—	43	44	4	In Love and Death
"All That I've Got"	2004	—	19	—	—	—	35	66	105	6	In Love and Death
"I Caught Fire"	2005	—	—	—	—	—	43	—	191	9	In Love and Death
"Under Pressure" (with My Chemical Romance)	2005	41	28	—	28	—	—	—	—	—	In Love and Death
"The Bird and the Worm"	2007	— (Note: "The Bird and the Worm" did not enter the Billboard Hot 100, but peaked at number seven on the Bubbling Under Hot 100 Singles chart.)	9	—	92	—	35	54	130	4	Lies for the Liars
"Pretty Handsome Awkward"	2007	—	37	—	—	—	—	75	—	—	Lies for the Liars
"Blood on My Hands"	2009	—	27	36	—	37	—	—	—	—	Artwork
"I Come Alive"	2012	—	29	—	—	42	—	—	—	—	Vulnerable
"Put Me Out"	2012	—	—	—	—	—	—	—	—	—	Vulnerable
"Hands and Faces"	2013	—	—	—	—	—	—	—	—	—	Vulnerable
"Cry"	2014	—	—	38	—	— (Note: "Cry" did not enter the Hot Rock & Alternative Songs chart, but peaked at number 11 on the Hard Rock Digital Song Sales chart.)	—	—	—	—	Imaginary Enemy
"Revolution"	2014	—	—	—	—	—	—	—	—	—	Imaginary Enemy
"Over and Over Again"	2017	—	—	—	—	—	—	—	—	—	The Canyon
"Rise Up Lights"	2017	—	—	—	—	—	—	—	—	—	The Canyon
"The Nexus"	2018	—	—	—	—	—	—	—	—	—	The Canyon
"Blow Me"	2019	—	—	—	—	—	—	—	—	—	Heartwork
"Paradise Lost, a poem by John Milton"	2020	—	—	28	—	—	—	—	—	—	Heartwork
"Cathedral Bell"	2020	—	—	—	—	—	—	—	—	—	Heartwork
"Fuck You"	2022	—	—	—	—	—	—	—	—	—	Medz
"People Are Vomit"	2023	—	—	—	—	—	—	—	—	—	Medz
"Numb"	2023	—	—	—	—	—	—	—	—	—	Toxic Positivity
"Giving Up"	2023	—	23	—	—	—	—	—	—	—	Toxic Positivity
"MEDZ"	2024	—	—	—	—	—	—	—	—	—	Medz
"—" denotes a recording that did not chart or was not released in that territory.

== Other songs ==
This is a list of non-album tracks by The Used.

Title	Year	Notes
"801 Underground"	2001	A non-album track released via The Used's first website.
"Untitled Instrumental"	2004	A non-album track found on the original The Used Nation fan club website.
"Under Pressure" (Queen and David Bowie cover)	2005	Recorded with My Chemical Romance for tsunami relief.
"All That I've Got" (acoustic version)	2005	Acoustic version of the song.
"Lunacy Fringe" (acoustic version)	2005	Acoustic version of the song.
"Tunnel" (alternative version)	2007	A bonus track on the Target edition of Lies for the Liars, this version has more violin and the complete band singing the chorus than the version that was released on Shallow Believer.
"Smother Me" (demo)	2007	A demo version released on the band's Myspace page with the song only containing vocals and piano as well as an additional verse omitted from the album version.
"Burning Down the House" (Talking Heads cover)	2009	Recorded for Covered, A Revolution in Sound: Warner Bros. Records.
"For You I Would"	2009	Unreleased song that was originally recorded for the soundtrack but was not used on the album and was never released.
"Sold My Soul (Time Lapse Mix)"	2009	A remix version of the song posted to the band's YouTube page.
"On The Cross (Save Yourself Mix)"	2009	A different version of the song released as a pre-order bonus track.
"On My Own" (PureVolume session)	2009	An acoustic live studio version of the song recorded for PureVolume website and released as a bonus track on iTunes version of Artwork.
"Lunacy Fringe" (PureVolume session)	2009	An acoustic live studio version of the song recorded for PureVolume website and released as a bonus track on iTunes version of Artwork.
"Empty With You" (PureVolume session)	2009	An acoustic live studio version of the song recorded for PureVolume website and released as a bonus track on iTunes version of Artwork.
"Paradise Lost (Acoustic)"	2021	An acoustic version released to the band's YouTube page as an unlisted video.

=== B-sides ===
This is a list of b-sides from The Used studio albums.

Album	B-sides
The Used	"Choke Me"; "Just a Little"
In Love and Death	"The Back of Your Mouth"; "Into My Web"
Lies for the Liars	"Dark Days; "Devil Beside You"; "Silt Your Own Throat"; "My Pesticide"; "Sun Comes Up"; "Sick Hearts"; "Pain"; "Tunnel"
Artwork	"Mosh n Church"; "In a Needle"; "Something Safe"
Vulnerable	"Surrender"; "The Lonely"; "Machine"; "Disaster"
Imaginary Enemy	"Money Monster"
The Canyon	none
Heartwork	"Night-Sea Journey"; "The Brothers Karamazov"; "River Stay"; "Mi Medicina, Mi Heroína"; "Blood Meridian"; "Brain Unguent"; "Playing the Victim"; "Operation Me"; "Love Heart"; "Sing Out of Tune"; "See You in Hell"
Toxic Positivity	"MEDZ"; "Fuck You"; "People Are Vomit"; "Sisyphus"; "Depression Personified"; "Terrified"; "Before I Leave"; "Take Yourself Out"; "Tell Me"; "Pain Is My Therapy"

== Music videos ==
Title	Year	Director(s)
"A Box Full of Sharp Objects"	2002	John Feldmann
"The Taste of Ink"	2002	The Malloys
"Buried Myself Alive"	2003	Arni and Kinski
"Blue and Yellow"	2003	
"Take It Away"	2004	Motion Theory
"All That I've Got"	2005	Marc Webb
"I Caught Fire"	2005	Kevin Kerslake
"The Bird and the Worm"	2007	Lisa Mann
"Paralyzed"	2007	CW Mihlberger
"Pretty Handsome Awkward"	2007	Lisa Mann
"Blood on My Hands"	2009	Lisa Mann
"Empty with You"	2009	Nate Weaver
"I Come Alive"	2012	Aaron Hymes
"Put Me Out"	2012	Justin Potter and JK Pincosy
"Hands and Faces"	2013	DJay Brawner
"Iddy Biddy"	2013	James Lano
"Quixotica"	2013	
"The Ocean of the Sky"	2013	
"Thought Criminal"	2013	
"Cry"	2014	Gus Black
"Revolution"	2014	Brendan Donahue
"The Bird and the Worm" (Acoustic)	2016	
"Over and Over Again"	2017	Lisa Mann
"Rise Up Lights"	2017	Lisa Mann
"The Nexus"	2018	Lisa Mann
"Blow Me"	2019	Pix3lface
"My Cocoon" / "Paradise Lost, a poem by John Milton"	2020	Brian Cox
"Cathedral Bell"	2020	
"The Lighthouse"	2020	Hidden Road Studios
"Fuck You"	2022	Anthony Tran
"Giving Up"	2023	Gabriel Russo
"MEDZ"	2024	Hunter Garrett
