= Cry (The Used song) =

Single by The Used

from the album Imaginary Enemy
- Released: January 27, 2014
- Recorded: 2013
- Genre: Post-hardcore
- Length: 3:26
- Label: Hopeless
- Songwriter(s): Quinn Allman: John Feldmann; Jeph Howard; Bert McCracken; Dan Whitesides
- Producer(s): John Feldmann

The Used singles chronology
"Hands and Faces" (2012)	"Cry" (2014)	"Over and Over Again" (2017)

Music video
- "Cry" on YouTube

"Cry" is a song by American rock band the Used, and was released as the first single for their sixth studio album Imaginary Enemy. It was released to radio and music video in January 2014.

== Release ==
On January 20, 2014, the Used released a sample of "Cry" on their Instagram page. The song was released with an accompanying music video a week later on January 27, 2014.

== Background ==
The Used's lead singer, Bert McCracken, explained that "Cry" was about the fight between love and conflict and that he believed everyone has experienced a loss of control while in a relationship.

== Reception ==
Professional ratings
Review scores
Source	Rating
AAA Music	4/5 stars
Bring the Noise UK	7/10

AAA Music said that while Cry departed from the band's "cry-hard songs" of the 2000s, the lyrics aligned with The Used's image. Similarly, Bringthenoiseuk praised McCracken's alternating vocals by saying they were performed "in a way only veterans of the style can".

Nick Antone, of Mindequalsblown, critiqued McCracken for having a "pop-sounding voice" on the lyrics in comparison to the rawness of The Ocean of the Sky. On the other hand, Antone praised the usage of Auto-Tune to create a Depeche Mode-like track.

== Music video ==
The Used released a music video for "Cry" directed by Gus Black on January 27, 2014. The music video takes place in a post-apocalyptic desert where a heroine, whose face is covered by a gas mask, goes against a villain who burns books.

Bert McCracken, lead singer of The Used, said that the video was to remind people to embrace the present and to avoid the constrictions of the future. In his statement, McCracken quoted Georg Wilhelm Friedrich Hegel's Elements of the Philosophy of Right and said "The owl of Minerva spreads its wings only with the falling of the dusk".

== Charts ==
Chart (2014)	Peak position
US Mainstream Rock (Billboard)	38
