= Vulnerable (The Used album) =

Studio album by the Used
- Released: March 26, 2012
- Recorded: 2010–2011
- Genre: Emo; post-hardcore; alternative rock
- Length: 43:47
- Label: Anger; Hopeless
- Producer: John Feldmann

The Used chronology
Artwork (2009)	Vulnerable (2012)	The Ocean of the Sky (2013)

Singles from Vulnerable
- 1. "I Come Alive" Released: January 10, 2012; 2. "Put Me Out" Released: August 14, 2012; 3. "Hands and Faces" Released: February 21, 2013

Alternative cover
- Re-issue cover (2013)

Professional ratings
Aggregate scores
Source	Rating
Metacritic	(69/100)
Review scores
Source	Rating
AbsolutePunk	(60%)
AllMusic	3.5/5 stars
Alternative Press	3.5/5 stars
Audiopinions	(9/10)
Blare Magazine	3/5 stars
Melodic	3/5 stars
The Metal Forge	7/10 stars
PopMatters	6/10 stars
Punknews.org	2/5 stars
Q	3/5 stars

Vulnerable is the fifth studio album by American rock band the Used. It was released on March 26, 2012, via Hopeless Records. The album was produced by John Feldmann, who also produced the band's first three studio albums, The Used (2002), In Love and Death (2004), and Lies for the Liars (2007), and their Maybe Memories (2003) compilation album.

== Background ==
In late April 2010, the group cancelled all upcoming shows in Europe and Russia, citing circumstances rising from a split with their management team. In addition, they mentioned they had started writing for their next album.

== Musical style ==
Lead singer Bert McCracken said of the album: "This record's really about becoming more than just who you are, and allowing yourself that vulnerability to be a more powerful person. It's a lot more positive than a lot of records we’ve written in the past. I think everyone could use some positivity nowadays."

McCracken also said about the music: "There's a lot of hip-hop influence, beats and drum and bass kind of stuff, but it's also still a Used record, by all means. Just like any other Used record, it's a horse of many colors: There are a lot of soft and heavy sounds, there are a lot of brutal, sharp, bright sounds, and the tempos are anywhere from ultra-slow to super fast and heavy. There are a lot of different conceptual feelings on the record."

== Release ==
"I Come Alive" was made available for streaming on January 5, 2012 through KROQ-FM, before being released as a single on January 10. The album's track listing was revealed on January 19. The following day, a lyric video was released for "I Come Alive". "I Come Alive" was released to alternative radio stations on February 14. "Hands and Faces" was released as a single on February 21. The group appeared at the Alternative Press' South by Southwest showcase on March 17 performing an acoustic set. In the days leading up to the release of the album, the band streamed several tracks through a variety of music websites: "Shine" (through Alternative Press) and "Put Me Out" (through Hurley International) on March 20, "Moving On" (through Revolver) and "Hurt No One" (through Noisecreep) on March 22, and "Getting Over You" and "This Fire" on March 23. Vulnerable was released on March 26 as joint release between Anger Music Group and Hopeless Records. On the same day, the group made an outtake "Machine" available for streaming.

On April 6, a music video was released for "I Come Alive". It was followed by streams of acoustic renditions of "I Come Alive" and "Put Me Out" on April 12. In April, the group embarked on a UK tour with support from Marmozets. In May and June, the group went on a headlining US tour, before appearing on the Warped Tour in June and July. On July 18, a lyric video was released for "Put Me Out". The track was released to alternative radio stations on August 14. The band released a music video for "Put Me Out" on September 17, before embarking on a headlining west coast US tour with support from Twin Atlantic and Stars in Stereo. In November, the band headlined Warped Tour UK before supporting Evanescence on their UK arena tour. On January 21, 2013, a deluxe edition was released featuring an extra disc of recordings and new artwork. Between January and March, the group headlined the Take Action Tour. On March 8, the band released a music video for "Hands and Faces". In May, the band co-headlined the AP Tour in Japan with Silverstein and Crossfaith.

== Track listing ==
All tracks are written by the Used, except where noted.

Standard edition
No.	Title	Writer(s)	Length
1.	"I Come Alive"		3:16
2.	"This Fire"	John Feldmann	3:14
3.	"Hands and Faces"	Feldmann	3:25
4.	"Put Me Out"	Feldmann	4:02
5.	"Shine"	Evan Taubenfeld	4:03
6.	"Now That You're Dead"	Feldmann	4:06
7.	"Give Me Love"		3:18
8.	"Moving On"		4:01
9.	"Getting Over You"	Martin Johnson	3:45
10.	"Kiss It Goodbye"	Feldmann	3:23
11.	"Hurt No One"	Feldmann	3:20
12.	"Together Burning Bright"	Feldmann	3:54
Total length:			43:47

=== Additional track information ===
The Used recorded 16 songs during the Vulnerable recording session. The 4 b-sides from the session are titled "Surrender", "The Lonely", "Machine", and "Disaster". Some were released as bonus tracks and were all later included on the reissue of the album along with acoustic and remix versions of some of the album's songs.

Japanese bonus tracks
No.	Title	Length
13.	"The Lonely"	3:29
14.	"I Come Alive" (Acoustic)	3:03
Total length:		50:27

Deluxe edition bonus tracks
No.	Title	Writer(s)	Length
13.	"Machine"		4:02
14.	"Disaster"		3:19
15.	"Put Me Out" (Acoustic)	Feldmann	3:50
16.	"I Come Alive" (Acoustic)		3:03
17.	"Together Burning Bright" (Acoustic)	Feldmann	3:59
Total length:			61:57

iTunes deluxe edition bonus tracks
No.	Title	Length
13.	"Machine"	4:02
14.	"Disaster"	3:19
15.	"I Come Alive" (Acoustic)	3:03
Total length:		54:14

Reissue second disc
No.	Title	Writer(s)	Length
1.	"Surrender"		4:04
2.	"The Lonely"		3:26
3.	"Machine"		4:01
4.	"Disaster"		3:18
5.	"I Come Alive" (Revolvr and Danny Mihai remix)		3:15
6.	"Hands and Faces" (Bobby Alt remix)	Feldmann	4:57
7.	"Put Me Out" (Kraddy remix)	Feldmann	3:00
8.	"I Come Alive" (Acoustic)		3:02
9.	"Put Me Out" (Acoustic)	Feldmann	3:49
10.	"Together Burning Bright" (Acoustic)	Feldmann	3:59

== Personnel ==
The Used

- Bert McCracken – lead vocals, programming
- Quinn Allman – guitar, additional vocals
- Jeph Howard – bass guitar, additional vocals
- Dan Whitesides – drums, additional vocals

Performers

- William Control – co-lead vocals on "Now That You're Dead"
- Landon Newsom – additional vocals on "The Lonely"

Design

- Frank Maddocks – artwork, design, photography

Technical and production

- John Feldmann – producer, mixing
- Brandon Hall Paddock – engineering, additional production
- Jeremy Hatcher – additional engineering
- Spencer Hoad – additional engineering
- Courtney Ballard – additional engineering
- Joe Gastwirt – mastering

== Charts ==
Chart performance
Chart (2012)	Peak position
Australian Albums (ARIA)	18
Canadian Albums (Billboard)	21
Swedish Albums (Sverigetopplistan)	58
UK Albums (OCC)	65
UK Independent Albums (OCC)	8
UK Rock & Metal Albums (OCC)	6
US Billboard 200	8
US Independent Albums (Billboard)	1
US Indie Store Album Sales (Billboard)	1
US Top Alternative Albums (Billboard)	3
US Top Hard Rock Albums (Billboard)	2
US Top Rock Albums (Billboard)	3

== Release history ==
Release dates and formats
Region	Date	Label	Format	Catalogue
United States	March 26, 2012	Hopeless, Anger	12" vinyl	HR749-1
United States	March 26, 2012	Hopeless, Anger	CD	HR749-2
Japan	April 11, 2012	Kick Rock	CD	EKRM-1212
