= I Come Alive =

Single by The Used

from the album Vulnerable
- Released: January 10, 2012
- Recorded: 2011
- Genre: Alternative rock
- Length: 3:26
- Label: Hopeless
- Songwriters: Quinn Allman; Jeph Howard; Bert McCracken; Dan Whitesides
- Producer: John Feldmann

The Used singles chronology
"Blood on My Hands" (2009)	"I Come Alive" (2012)	"Put Me Out" (2012)

"I Come Alive" is a single by American rock band the Used, from the fifth studio album Vulnerable. The song impacted radio on February 14, 2012 along with a music video.

The music video, directed by Aaron Hymes, depicts a boy getting bullied by other kids and getting abused by his own father. At the end, he gets revenge on his enemies by chasing and eventually killing the bullies with a baseball bat, stabs his father to death (graphic) and then stares at the body in anger. The band does not appear in this video.

== Chart performance ==
The single debuted and peaked at number 29 on the Billboard Alternative songs chart, and it was the last single to appear on the chart until "Giving Up" in 2023.

Chart (2012)	Peak position
US Rock Songs (Billboard)	42
US Alternative Songs (Billboard)	29
