= Imaginary Enemy (album) =

Studio album by The Used
- Released: April 1, 2014
- Genre: Alternative rock; post-hardcore; pop punk
- Length: 54:09
- Label: GAS Union; Hopeless
- Producer: John Feldmann

The Used chronology
The Ocean of the Sky (2013)	Imaginary Enemy (2014)	Live & Acoustic at the Palace (2016)

Singles from Imaginary Enemy
- 1. "Cry" Released: February 4, 2014; 2. "Revolution" Released: September 17, 2014

Imaginary Enemy is the sixth studio album by American rock band the Used. It is the first album released on, and the second label the band created and own, GAS Union.

Imaginary Enemy is the final album to feature guitarist Quinn Allman before he parted from the band in November 2015.

== Recording ==
The album was produced by John Feldmann, who also produced all of the band's studio albums with the exception of Artwork.

In an interview with Jeph, he stated that they recorded the album "backwards" by having the vocals recorded first and then having the music written to the vocals. It is the first time they have recorded like this and did so because they were unhappy with the sound of the songs when recording the music so they scrapped the dozen songs they had written and tried something new.

== Release ==
On January 20, 2014, Imaginary Enemy was announced for release in April; its track listing and artwork were revealed. A week later, a music video was released for "Cry". The track was released to alternative radio stations on February 4. Following a performance at South by So What?! festival, the band went on a co-headlining US tour with Taking Back Sunday in March and April. They were supported by Sleepwave and Tonight Alive. Imaginary Enemy was made available for streaming on March 26, before being released on April 1 through Hopeless Records and the band's label GAS Union. The band performed at the Download Festival in the UK in June. The group toured Australia with Taking Back Sunday in August and the US in September and October with support from Frank Iero.

Partway through the tour, the group released a split 10" vinyl EP, which featured two songs by Taking Back Sunday, and "Revolution" and "Money Monster" from the Used. On September 18, a music video was released for "Revolution". The track was released to alternative radio stations on September 30. On February 2, 2015, the band announced that guitarist Quinn Allman would be taking a temporary year of absence; Justin Shekoski of Saosin filled in Allman's role. Following this, the group went on a headlining UK tour with support from Decade and Landscapes. In April and May, the group went on a headlining US tour with support from Every Time I Die, Marmozets and the Eeries, before embarking on a co-headlining US tour with Chevelle later in May. In October, the band appeared at the Taste of Chaos festival.

== Reception ==
Professional ratings
Review scores
Source	Rating
AllMusic	4/5 stars
Alternative Press	3.5/5 stars
Dead Press!	6/10 stars
HM Magazine	4/5 stars
Punknews.org	3/5 stars

At Alternative Press, Evan Lucy rated the album three-and-a-half stars out of five, writing that "Whether the band's fanbase latches on to the politicism is yet to be seen, but these songs will sound great from the pit regardless."

The album charted at number 14 on the Billboard 200 and number 1 on the Independent albums chart.

== Track listing ==
No.	Title	Length
1.	"Revolution"	4:04
2.	"Cry"	3:30
3.	"El-Oh-Vee-Ee"	3:32
4.	"A Song to Stifle Imperial Progression (A Work in Progress)"	4:05
5.	"Generation Throwaway"	3:05
6.	"Make Believe"	3:27
7.	"Evolution"	4:38
8.	"Imaginary Enemy"	3:24
9.	"Kenna Song"	4:20
10.	"Force Without Violence"	5:23
11.	"Overdose" (ends at 3:52, hidden track "Red Heart" starts at 7:41)	14:41

=== Additional track information ===
The Used released 13 tracks from the Imaginary Enemy recording session. The only two b-sides released to date is "Money Monster" and "Red Heart", "Money Monster" which was released as a bonus track on the limited edition of the album. A hidden track titled "Red Heart" also appears at the end of the album.

Limited edition bonus track
No.	Title	Length
12.	"Money Monster"	3:02

== Limited edition ==
A limited edition of 15,000 numbered copies will be made featuring deluxe artwork and a bonus track titled "Money Monster".

== Personnel ==
The Used

- Bert McCracken – lead vocals
- Quinn Allman – guitar
- Jeph Howard – bass
- Dan Whitesides – drums

Technical and production

- John Feldmann – producer, mixing
- Zakk Cervini – programming, additional mixing, engineering
- Ago Teppand – programming, additional mixing, engineering
- Kenny Carkeet – programming, additional mixing, engineering
- Chris Qualls – additional engineering
- James Clarke – additional engineering

== Chart performance ==
Chart (2014)	Peak position
US Billboard 200	14
US Billboard Rock Albums	5
US Billboard Alternative Albums	5
US Billboard Independent Albums	1

== Live debut of the songs ==
Song	Venue	Date	Tour	Source
Cry	QuikTrip Park, Grand Prairie, Texas, U.S.	Mar 14, 2014	2014 Spring Tour	
Revolution	Kool Haus, Toronto, Canada	April 8, 2014	2014 Spring Tour	
A Song to Stifle Imperial Progression (A Work in Progress)	Egyptian Room at Old National Centre, Indianapolis, Indiana, U.S.	Sep 14, 2014		
Overdose	Palace Theatre, Los Angeles, California, U.S.	Oct 11, 2015	Live and Acoustic At The Palace (special event)	

== Release history ==
Region	Date	Format(s)	Edition(s)	Label	Ref.
United Kingdom	March 31, 2014	CD; LP; digital download	Standard	GAS Union; Hopeless	
United States	April 1, 2014	CD; LP; digital download	Standard; limited	GAS Union; Hopeless	
Japan	April 2, 2014	CD; digital download	Standard	GAS Union; Hopeless; Kick Rock Invasion	
Australia	April 4, 2014	CD; digital download	Standard; limited	GAS Union; Hopeless	
Germany	April 4, 2014	CD; LP; digital download	Standard	GAS Union; Hopeless; Soulfood	
