= Heartwork (The Used album) =

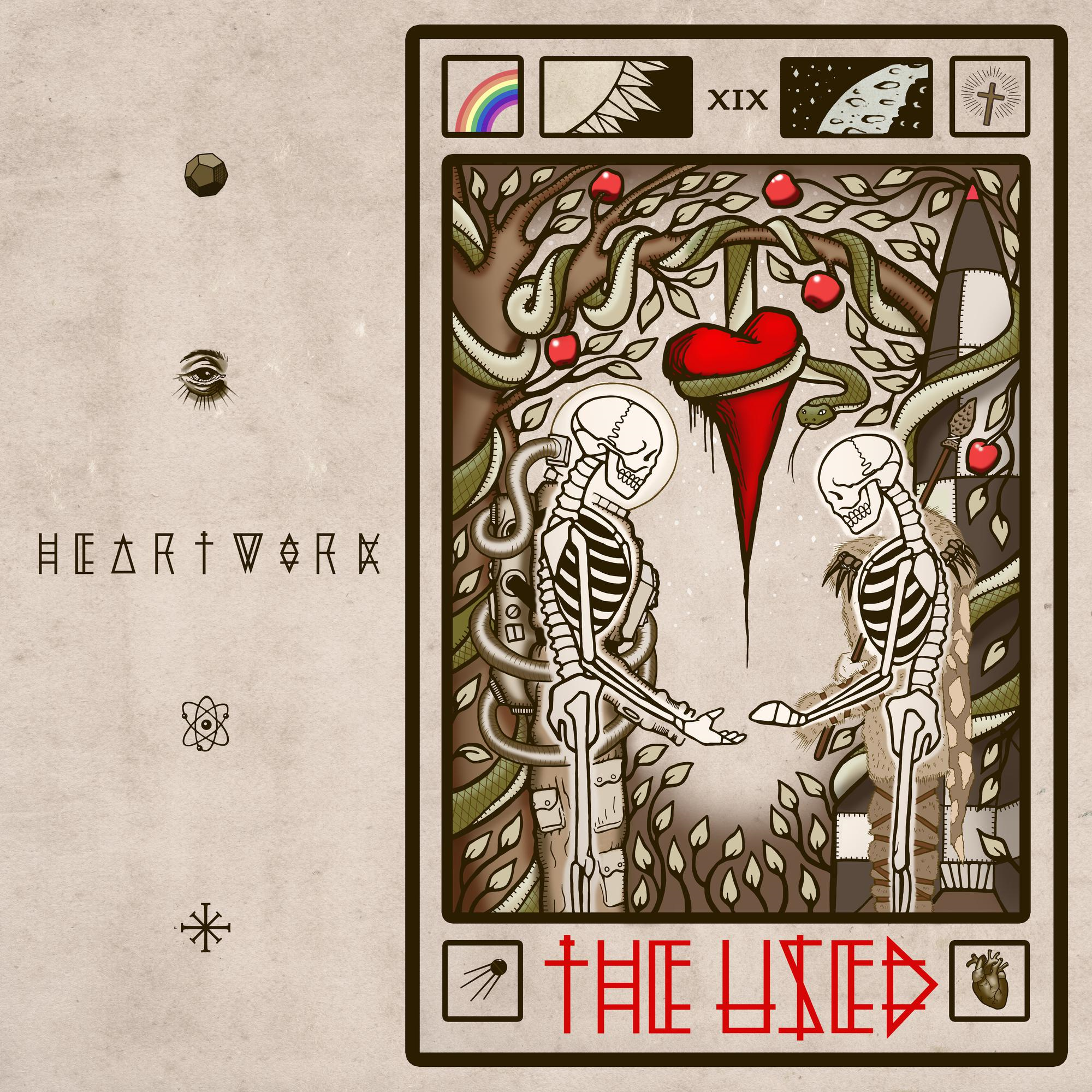

Studio album by the Used
- Released: April 24, 2020; September 10, 2021 (Deluxe Reissue)
- Recorded: 2019
- Studio: Foxy Studios, Los Angeles
- Genre: Post-hardcore; pop rock; alternative rock
- Length: 46:18
- Label: Big Noise; Hassle
- Producer: John Feldmann

The Used chronology
The Canyon (2017)	Heartwork (2020)	Toxic Positivity (2023)

Singles from Heartwork
- 1. "Blow Me" Released: December 6, 2019; 2. "Paradise Lost, a poem by John Milton" Released: February 7, 2020; 3. "Cathedral Bell" Released: April 17, 2020; 4. "The Lighthouse" Released: May 18, 2020

Heartwork is the eighth studio album by American rock band the Used. It was released on April 24, 2020, on Big Noise.

== Background ==
In mid-2019, the Used signed to their long-time friend and producer John Feldmann's record label Big Noise. They started recording the album in June 2019, took a break to headline the Disrupt Festival tour, and finished recording the album in November 2019. A music video for the single "Blow Me" was released in December 2019, "Paradise Lost, a poem by John Milton" in February, and "Cathedral Bell" in April. This is the first album to feature Joey Bradford on guitar after Justin Shekoski left in 2018. The band recorded 27 songs during the Heartwork sessions, 16 of these featured on the original release, and the remaining 11 were released on the deluxe edition of the album on September 10, 2021.

== Reception ==
Professional ratings
Review scores
Source	Rating
AllMusic	3.5/5 stars
Gigwise	8/10 stars
Kerrang!	4/5 stars
NME	4/5 stars
Wall of Sound	9.5/10

The album appears in Alternative Press's The 50 best albums of 2020 list, with the following justification: "The Used rarely shy away from tugging at your heartstrings, and the sonically and stylistically diverse album more than does the trick in the emotion department. [...] This release is certainly their most consistent front-to-back album since 2009's Artwork".

Ali Shutler of NME rated the album four out of five stars, writing that the Used returned to their heart-pounding choruses and pop sensibilities after their experimental work with The Canyon. She wrote that "Heartwork is full of dark, brooding songs" that are familiar but daring.

At gigwise.com, Laviea Thomas gave it eight out of ten stars. She noted that the album started with flying riffs and swirling energy that becomes a joyous ride ending with an emotional goodbye as McCracken pleads, "I just wanna feel something, anything is better than this." Thomas also wrote that the return of Feldmann was "an undeniable part of the magic behind this album."

"Paradise Lost, a poem by John Milton" is one of the 68 best rock songs of 2020 according to Loudwire and it is described as follows: "A strummy start gives way to more fleshed out aggression as The Used vocalist Bert McCracken belts about the angst of not being able to cut ties while knowing a situation is still bad for you. The singer taps into the pain of knowing something but being reluctant to acknowledge it".

== Track listing ==
No.	Title	Length
1.	"Paradise Lost, a poem by John Milton"	2:47
2.	"Blow Me"	3:20
3.	"Big, Wanna Be"	3:30
4.	"Bloody Nose"	3:04
5.	"Wow, I Hate This Song"	2:56
6.	"My Cocoon"	1:00
7.	"Cathedral Bell"	3:04
8.	"1984 (Infinite Jest)"	2:44
9.	"Gravity's Rainbow"	4:14
10.	"Clean Cut Heals"	2:51
11.	"Heartwork"	1:22
12.	"The Lighthouse"	2:51
13.	"Obvious Blasé"	2:52
14.	"The Lottery"	2:44
15.	"Darkness Bleeds, FOTF"	4:01
16.	"To Feel Something"	2:56
Total length:		46:18

Deluxe edition bonus tracks
No.	Title	Length
1.	"Night-Sea Journey"	4:29
2.	"The Brothers Karamazov"	3:24
3.	"River Stay"	3:05
4.	"Mi Medicina, Mi Heroína"	2:26
5.	"Blood Meridian"	2:46
6.	"Brain Unguent"	1:28
7.	"Playing the Victim"	2:23
8.	"Operation Me"	3:01
9.	"Love Heart"	3:45
10.	"Sing Out of Tune"	3:12
11.	"See You in Hell"	3:15
Total length:		33:34

== Personnel ==
- Bert McCracken – vocals
- Jeph Howard – bass, backing vocals
- Dan Whitesides – drums, backing vocals
- Joey Bradford – guitars, backing vocals

Additional musicians

- Jason Aalon Butler – on "Blow Me"
- Mark Hoppus – on "The Lighthouse"
- Travis Barker – on "Obvious Blasé"
- Caleb Shomo – on "The Lottery"

Production

- John Feldmann – producer, mixing, string arrangements
- Dylan McLean – engineer, additional production
- Scot Stewart – engineer, mixing, additional production
- Dave Kutch – mastering
- Michael Bono – assistant engineer
- Jacob Magness – assistant engineer
- Josh Thornberry – assistant engineer
- Cam Rackam – cover art and art direction
- Damien Lawson – additional design

== Charts ==
Chart performance for Heartwork
Chart (2020)	Peak position
Scottish Albums (OCC)	68
UK Album Downloads (OCC)	41
UK Album Sales (OCC)	37
UK Physical Albums (OCC)	53
UK Rock & Metal Albums (OCC)	8
US Billboard 200	87
US Top Alternative Albums (Billboard)	4
US Top Hard Rock Albums (Billboard)	4
US Top Rock Albums (Billboard)	11
