= Blood on My Hands =

"Blood On My Hands"

Single by The Used

from the album Artwork
- Released: June 30, 2009
- Recorded: 2009
- Genre: Hard rock; post-hardcore
- Length: 3:18
- Label: Reprise
- Songwriters: Quinn Allman; Jeph Howard; Bert McCracken; Dan Whitesides
- Producer: Matt Squire

The Used singles chronology
"Pretty Handsome Awkward" (2007)	"Blood On My Hands" (2009)	"I Come Alive" (2012)

"Blood on My Hands" is the first single from the Used's fourth studio album Artwork. The single was released on June 30, 2009 via 12-inch picture disc vinyl and digital download, and began airing on the radio starting July 14, 2009. The music video for "Blood on My Hands" premiered on the band's MySpace on July 28, 2009.

== Track listings ==
=== 12-inch picture disc vinyl ===
No.	Title	Length
1.	"Blood on My Hands"	3:18
2.	"Blood on My Hands (instrumental)"	3:18

== Music video ==
The music video of "Blood on My Hands" premiered on MySpace and theused.net on July 28, 2009. It was directed by Lisa Mann, who also directed the band's video for "The Bird and the Worm" in 2007. The video begins with Bert smoking at a desk. It then features newspaper articles stating that Bert is an alleged killer. The video continues to show various scenes of the band performing in a room, and scenes of Bert walking in a prison. However, it soon becomes clear that Bert is not in fact the killer, but another man is, possibly a pedophile whom Bert kills. His head is covered with a dark black bag, and the noose is tied around his neck. A priest gives Bert the Last Rites, while he is executed by hanging.

An uncensored version of the video appears on the ticket pre-sale edition of the album Artwork. This version shows more gruesome scenes of girls who were killed by the pedophile such as one whose face was cut off and worn by the killer. When Bert kills the pedophile, he is shown stabbing him multiple times and bloodying his own face. As he's walked out of the prison to be hanged, the faces of the pedophile are flashed onto Bert's face showing that people assume he was the killer.

== Charts ==
Chart (2009)	Peak position
U.S. Billboard Alternative Songs	27
U.S. Billboard Mainstream Rock Tracks	36
U.S. Billboard Rock Songs	38
