= Blue and Yellow =

Single by the Used

from the album The Used
- Released: May 20, 2003
- Recorded: 2002
- Genre: Emo
- Length: 3:21
- Label: Reprise
- Songwriters: Bert McCracken; Quinn Allman; Jeph Howard; Branden Steineckert
- Producer: John Feldmann

The Used singles chronology
| "Buried Myself Alive" (2003) | "Blue and Yellow" (2003) | "Take It Away" (2004) |

"Blue and Yellow" is the third single from the Used's self-titled debut album The Used. It was released to radio on May 20, 2003 and a music video was released around the same time. This song is about the friendship between Bert and Quinn.

== Music video ==
The music video was not filmed at a video shoot but instead is a compilation of video clips of the band over the previous 2 years. It starts with the band playing in a small room. It transfers between Bert singing in a blue room and clips of the band live and touring. The video is included on the Maybe Memories DVD.

== Track listing ==
US promotional single

1. "Blue and Yellow" (Album Version) – 3:21

== Personnel ==
- John Feldmann – engineer, mixed by, producer

== Charts ==
| Chart (2003) | Peak position |
|---|---|
| US Alternative Airplay (Billboard) | 23 |

== Release history ==
| Region | Date | Format | Label |
|---|---|---|---|
| United States | May 20, 2003 | Modern rock radio | Reprise |
