= Meds (disambiguation) =

Meds may refer to:

- Medications, drugs to treat or prevent diseases
- Meds (album), by Placebo
  - "Meds" (song), the title song, featuring Alison Mosshart
- The Med people of South Asia

== See also ==
- Medz, an album by rock band the Used
