= Maybe Memories =

Compilation album by the Used
- Released: July 15, 2003
- Studio: Foxy Studios, Marina del Rey, Branden's Bedroom
- Length: 34:37
- Label: Reprise
- Director: Evan Aaronson
- Producer: John Feldmann; Branden

The Used chronology
The Used (2002)	Maybe Memories (2003)	In Love and Death (2004)

Professional ratings
Review scores
Source	Rating
AllMusic	2.5/5 stars

Maybe Memories is a compilation album by American rock band the Used. It was released on July 15, 2003 and has since been certified platinum. The album consists of live songs from their self-titled album, demos from Demos from the Basement, and previously unreleased material.

== Track listing ==
All tracks are written by the Used except "Alone This Holiday" written by the Used and John Feldmann.

CD
No.	Title	Length
1.	"Maybe Memories" (Live at the Henry Fonda Music Box Theatre, March 21, 2003)	3:12
2.	"A Box Full of Sharp Objects" (Live at the Henry Fonda Music Box Theatre, March 21, 2003)	2:56
3.	"On My Own" (Live at the Henry Fonda Music Box Theatre, March 21, 2003)	2:46
4.	"Say Days Ago" (Live at the Henry Fonda Music Box Theatre, March 21, 2003)	5:41
5.	"Just a Little" (Unreleased track from debut album)	3:29
6.	"It Could be a Good Excuse" (Home demo)	2:52
7.	"Zero Mechanism" (Home demo)	2:36
8.	"Bulimic" (Home demo)	3:23
9.	"Alone This Holiday" (Recorded for KROQ Christmas album)	2:57
10.	"Sometimes I Just Go for It" (Unreleased music for song idea from debut album)	4:46
Total length:		34:33

DVD
No.	Title	Length
1.	"Maybe Memories" (A video diary)	36:42
2.	"A Box Full of Sharp Objects" (Music video)	3:05
3.	"The Taste of Ink" (Music video)	3:22
4.	"Buried Myself Alive" (Music video)	3:36
5.	"Blue and Yellow" (Music video)	3:27
6.	"Buried Myself Alive" (The making of)	9:10
7.	"The Taste of Ink" (The making of)	8:59
8.	"Maybe Memories" (Live at the Henry Fonda Music Box Theatre, March 21, 2003)
9.	"A Box Full of Sharp Objects" (Live at the Henry Fonda Music Box Theatre, March 21, 2003)
10.	"On My Own" (Live at the Henry Fonda Music Box Theatre, March 21, 2003)
11.	"Say Days Ago" (Live at the Henry Fonda Music Box Theatre, March 21, 2003)
12.	"Bert" (Band video bio)	2:57
13.	"Jeph" (Band video bio)	2:48
14.	"Branden" (Band video bio)	3:23
15.	"Quinn" (Band video bio)	2:41
16.	"COPS" (Hidden easter egg; home video of Branden, Jeph, and Quinn doing a COPS-like chase on skateboards. This can be seen by going to "the band" and pressing left on Jeph.)	9:31
Total length:		75:00

== Personnel ==
The Used

- Bert McCracken – vocals
- Branden Steineckert – drums
- Quinn Allman – guitar
- Jeph Howard – bass

Visuals

- Justin Wambolt-Reynolds – design

Technical and production – Album

- John Feldmann – production, engineering, mixing
- Mark Blewett – additional engineering
- Joe Gastwirt – mastering

Technical and production – Video

- Evan Aaronson – producer, editor, director
- Paul Heiman – editor
- Hello Media – producer, director
- John Feldmann – audio mixing
- Hello Media – producer, editor
- Ken Blaustein – additional camera work
- Seth Manheimer – additional camera work
- The Used – additional camera work
- David May – producer
- Penny Marciano – production director
- Raena Winscott – graphic coordinator
- Spencer Chrislu – DVD authoring
- Craig Aaronson – DVD authoring
- David Dieckman – DVD authoring

Managerial

- Craig Aaronson – executive producer, A&R

== Charts ==
Chart performance for Maybe Memories (album)
Chart (2003–2005)	Peak position
Australian Albums (ARIA)	95
Canadian Albums (Nielsen SoundScan)	133
US Billboard 200	84

Chart performance for Maybe Memories (video)
Chart (2003)	Peak position
US Music Video Sales (Billboard)	2

== Certifications ==
Certifications for Maybe Memories
Region	Certification	Certified units/sales
United States (RIAA) video	Platinum	100,000^{^}
^{^} Shipments figures based on certification alone.

== Release history ==
Region	Date	Label	Format	Catalogue
United States	July 15, 2003	Reprise	CD+DVD	48503-2
Japan	August 6, 2003	Reprise	CD+DVD	WPZR-30015-6
