= The Ocean of the Sky =

The Ocean of The Sky

EP by The Used
- Released: July 9, 2013
- Genre: Post-hardcore; alternative rock
- Length: 40:29
- Label: Anger; Hopeless

The Used chronology
Vulnerable (2012)	The Ocean of The Sky (2013)	Imaginary Enemy (2014)

Professional ratings
Review scores
Source	Rating
Dead Press!	1/10 stars

The Ocean of the Sky is an EP by American rock band the Used, released on July 9, 2013. It is available as a digital download and in compact disc format. A vinyl format was released in September 2013. It peaked at No. 20 on the alternative chart and No. 108 on the Billboard 200 chart.

== Release ==
In July, the group played two weeks on the Warped Tour. Around this, the band surprise released The Ocean of the Sky EP on July digitally with physical copies available on the Warped Tour. The following day, a music video was released for "Iddy Biddy". On August 15, the band released a documentary on the making of the EP. On September 19, music videos were released for "Quixotica", "Thought Criminal" and "The Ocean of the Sky". Following this, the group went on a west coast US tour with support from William Control in October. The band then performed as part of Warped Tour Australia in November and December.

== Track listing ==
No.	Title	Length
1.	"Iddy Biddy"	3:21
2.	"Quixotica"	3:37
3.	"Thought Criminal"	4:46
4.	"The Ocean of the Sky"	8:15
5.	"Tethys"	20:28
Total length:		40:29

== Live debut of the songs ==
Song	Venue	Date	Tour	Source
"Iddy Biddy"	The Flats at Molson Canadian Amphitheatre, Toronto, Canada	July 5, 2013	Vans Warped Tour 2013	
"The Ocean of the Sky"	Hawthorne Theatre, Portland, Oregon, U.S.	January 26, 2020	North America Tour 2020	

== Personnel ==
=== Band ===
- Bert McCracken – lead vocals, keyboards
- Quinn Allman – guitar, additional vocals
- Jeph Howard – bass guitar, additional vocals
- Dan Whitesides – drums, additional vocals

Additional performers

- Ryan Muirhead – gang vocals on "Iddy Biddy"
