= The Canyon (The Used album) =

Studio album by the Used
- Released: October 27, 2017
- Recorded: 2017
- Studios: Studio 606, Los Angeles, Valentine Recording Studios, North Hollywood, California
- Genres: Post-hardcore; alternative rock
- Length: 78:58
- Label: Hopeless
- Producer: Ross Robinson

The Used chronology
Live & Acoustic at the Palace (2016)	The Canyon (2017)	Heartwork (2020)

Singles from The Canyon
- 1. "Over and Over Again" Released: September 7, 2017; 2. "Rise Up Lights" Released: November 3, 2017; 3. "The Nexus" Released: May 2, 2018

The Canyon is the seventh studio album by American rock band the Used.

The album was released as double album on October 27, 2017, through Hopeless Records and is dedicated to Tregen Lewis, a friend of singer Bert McCracken's, who shot himself in Provo Canyon about a week after ceasing use of anti-depressants. It is the only studio album to feature guitarist Justin Shekoski since Quinn Allman's departure in 2015.

The Canyon was highly acclaimed by critics and fans alike and appeared on many best-of-the-year lists, though sales were relatively disappointing as the album peaked at 50 on the Billboard 200.

== Background and production ==
On February 2, 2015, the band announced that guitarist Quinn Allman took a temporary leave of absence for a year, with Justin Shekoski of Saosin stepping in as guitarist. On November 19, the group officially parted ways with Allman and made Shekoski a full-time member. Following this, the group went a short tour in April and May 2016 to celebrate their 15th anniversary. Further dates were added extending it into June, before a second leg in August and September was added.

The Canyon is the group's first album to feature production from Ross Robinson. Previous albums utilized John Feldmann (with the exception of Artwork, produced by Matt Squire). The album was the band's first recorded using entirely analog equipment, with no click-tracks or backing vocals, to achieve a raw sound. Some of the song titles reference David Foster Wallace, Syria and The Odyssey, among others.

The Canyon is also the group's first and only studio album with guitarist Justin Shekoski. On Shekoski's addition to the band, in an interview with Billboard, lead singer Bert McCracken stated Shekoski's "lust for life and passion for art is inspiring. It's been a fire underneath The Used. It's a new chapter of a brand new book" and "since Justin became a part of the Used it's been nothing but exciting for the next step." The band members were inspired following the live recording of Live and Acoustic at the Palace (2016), and wanted to reflect the live experience in their new album.

== Release ==
On September 7, 2017, The Canyon was announced for release the following month; alongside this, a music video was released for the first single, "Over and Over Again." The music video was directed by Lisa Mann and included dance choreography with bright visuals. In October and November 2017, the group went on a headlining US tour with support from Glassjaw. A lyric video was released for "Rise Up Lights" on October 23, 2017. The Canyon was released on October 27, 2017 through Hopeless Records. A music video was released for "Rise Up Lights" on November 3, 2017 which also depicted interpretive dancing "seemingly meant for their avant-garde dystopian anthem."

The group were due to go on a European tour in February 2018, but the shows were postponed until August 2018 due to a "family death."

Following this, the group went on a headlining US tour with support from Red Sun Rising and Fever 333 in April and May 2018. On May 1, a music video was released for "The Nexus". Directed by Lisa Mann, the video is a love story between two "identities battling for supremacy and independence only to be locked in patterned loops together throughout time told through experimental movement." The band then performed on the Warped Tour in June and July. The group also appeared at the Reading and Leeds Festivals in August 2018.

== Reception ==
Professional ratings
Aggregate scores
Source	Rating
Metacritic	75/100
Review scores
Source	Rating
AllMusic	4/5 stars
Alternative Press	4/5 stars
Drowned in Sound	4.5/5 stars
New Noise	4.5/5 stars

The album received positive reception following its release, with Alternative Press claiming the album has "A vibrancy and vulnerability not felt since the Used's 2002 self-titled debut," and stating that the band's new guitarist Justin Shekoski "has breathed new life into the songwriting." McCracken's delivery of the lyrics coupled with Shekoski's melodies and riffs, showed "The Used have fully realized their wild imagination" and critics noted "this collection of songs are more compelling and moving than anything heard previously from the band."

The album appears in AllMusic's 2017 Year In Review: Favorite Punk Albums, Alternative Press's The 40 best albums of 2017, Drowned in Sound's Album of 2017: Staff edit and Kerrang!'s Albums of 2017 lists.

== Track listing ==
Disc One
No.	Title	Length
1.	"For You"	4:35
2.	"Cold War Telescreen"	4:41
3.	"Broken Windows"	4:45
4.	"Rise Up Lights"	3:28
5.	"Vertigo Cave"	4:25
6.	"Pretty Picture"	4:11
7.	"Funeral Post"	5:19
8.	"Upper Falls"	5:34
9.	"The Divine Absence (This Is Water)"	5:00
Total length:		41:58

All tracks are written by Justin Shekoski, Bert McCracken, Jeph Howard, Dan Whitesides.

Disc Two
No.	Title	Length
10.	"Selfies in Aleppo"	4:33
11.	"Moving the Mountain (Odysseus Surrenders)"	4:16
12.	"Over and Over Again"	5:14
13.	"The Quiet War"	4:11
14.	"Moon-Dream"	4:45
15.	"The Nexus"	4:41
16.	"About You (No Songs Left to Sing)"	3:47
17.	"The Mouth of the Canyon"	5:33
Total length:		37:00

== Live debut of the songs ==
Song	Venue	Date	Tour	Source
About You (No Songs Left to Sing)	SeaLegs Live at the Beach, Huntington Beach, California, U.S.	August 9, 2017	-	
For You	Masonic Auditorium, San Francisco, California, U.S.	October 27, 2017	The Canyon Tour	
Over and Over Again	Masonic Auditorium, San Francisco, California, U.S.	October 27, 2017	The Canyon Tour	
Rise Up Lights	Masonic Auditorium, San Francisco, California, U.S.	October 27, 2017	The Canyon Tour	
The Nexus	Uptown Theater, Kansas City, Missouri, U.S.	October 31, 2017	The Canyon Tour	
Selfies in Aleppo	Starland Ballroom, Sayreville, New Jersey, U.S.	November 12, 2017	The Canyon Tour	

== Personnel ==
The Used

- Bert McCracken – lead vocals, piano (tracks 8 & 12), solina strings on "The Quiet War"
- Justin Shekoski – guitars, backing vocals, fretless guitar, banjo, Hammond B-3, harmonica, piano arrangement, programming, solina strings, album cover design
- Jeph Howard – bass guitar
- Dan Whitesides – drums, percussion

Additional personnel

- Jeph Howard, Rob McCracken, Justin Shekoski, Dan Whitesides, Brittni Whitesides, Erin Balboa, Michael Balboa, Danny Payne and Travis Pavur - group vocals on tracks 4,6,10
- Charlene Huang, Nicole Garcia - violins on tracks 1,2,7,8,12,14,17
- Hiro Goto - viola and strings arrangements on tracks 1,2,7,8,12,14,17
- April Guthrie - cello on tracks 1,2,7,8,12,14,17
- Edie Lehmann Boddicker, Luke Edgemon, Missi Hale - backing vocal ensemble on tracks 2,7,8,11,12,17
- Ron Manaog - percussion (all tracks except 1,14)
- The Used and Farrah Whitesides - percussion on "Vertigo Cave"
- Cleopatra Rose McCracken - vocals on "Moon-Dream"
- Michael Lehmann Boddicker - piano and synthesizer production on "Moon-Dream"

Production

- Ross Robinson – producer, mixing
- Michael Balboa - engineering
- Mike Frase - mixing
- Travis Pavur - additional engineering

== Charts ==
Chart (2017)	Peak position
Australian Albums (ARIA)	69
US Billboard 200	50
US Top Alternative Albums (Billboard)	6
US Top Hard Rock Albums (Billboard)	3
US Top Rock Albums (Billboard)	8
