= The Taste of Ink =

Single by the Used

from the album The Used
- Released: September 2002
- Recorded: 2002
- Studio: Foxy Studios in Marina del Rey, California, US
- Genre: Emo; pop-punk
- Length: 3:28
- Label: Reprise
- Songwriter(s): Bert McCracken; Quinn Allman; Jeph Howard; Branden Steineckert
- Producer(s): John Feldmann

The Used singles chronology
"The Taste of Ink" (2002)	"Buried Myself Alive" (2003)

"The Taste of Ink" is the debut single by American rock band the Used from their self-titled debut album The Used. It was released to radio September 2002 along with a music video for TV directed by the Malloys. A music video was filmed in August. A CD single was later released in March 2003 with contained a b-side, Christmas song, and music video. A demo version can be found on the band's demo album Demos from the Basement which was a CD distributed by the band in 2001 which was then called Used.

== Track listings ==
=== CD single ===
All tracks are written by The Used.

No.	Title	Length
1.	"The Taste of Ink"	3:28
2.	"Just a Little"	3:28
3.	"Alone This Holiday"	2:56
4.	"The Taste of Ink" (music video on enhanced CD)
Total length:		9:52

=== 7-inch vinyl ===
No.	Title	Length
1.	"The Taste of Ink"	3:28
2.	"Just a Little"	3:28
Total length:		6:56

== Personnel ==
- Craig Aaronson – A&R
- John Feldmann – engineer (track 1), mixed by (tracks: 1 & 2), producer
- Freeze Artist Management – management
- Paul Gomez – management
- John Reese – management

== Charts ==
Chart (2002–03)	Peak position
Scotland (OCC)	57
UK Singles (OCC)	52
UK Rock & Metal (OCC)	3
US Alternative Airplay (Billboard)	19
