= Live & Acoustic at the Palace =

Live album by The Used
- Released: April 1, 2016
- Venue: The Palace Theatre in Los Angeles
- Length: 60:49
- Label: Hopeless

The Used chronology
Imaginary Enemy (2014)	Live & Acoustic at the Palace (2016)	The Canyon (2017)

Live & Acoustic at the Palace is a live acoustic album by the Used to celebrate the 15th anniversary of the band. It was recorded at a show on October 11, 2015, at the Palace in Los Angeles. It is the first release without the guitarist Quinn Allman. The performance featured guest musicians including a string quartet, pianist, harpist, extra percussion and a three-piece gospel choir.

== Track listing ==
No.	Title	Length
1.	"Tunnel"	4:01
2.	"The Taste of Ink"	6:07
3.	"Yesterday's Feelings"	4:06
4.	"Lunacy Fringe"	4:35
5.	"The Bird and the Worm"	4:35
6.	"Paralyzed"	3:59
7.	"All That I've Got"	6:51
8.	"Overdose"	5:57
9.	"Blue and Yellow"	5:58
10.	"Hard to Say"	5:49
11.	"Imagine (John Lennon cover)"	4:16
12.	"On My Own"	4:35

== Personnel ==
The Used

- Bert McCracken – vocals
- Justin Shekoski – guitar
- Jeph Howard – bass
- Dan Whitesides – drums
