= Toxic Positivity =

Studio album by The Used
- Released: May 19, 2023
- Recorded: October 2021 and February 2023
- Studios: Foxy Studios, Los Angeles
- Genres: Alternative rock; emo-pop; pop rock; post-hardcore
- Length: 30:37
- Label: Big Noise
- Producer: John Feldmann

The Used chronology
Heartwork (2020)	Toxic Positivity (2023)	MEDZ (2024)

Singles from Toxic Positivity
- 1. "Numb" Released: April 21, 2023; 2. "Giving Up" Released: May 17, 2023

Professional ratings
Review scores
Source	Rating
Kerrang!	3/5
New Noise	5/5 stars

Toxic Positivity is the ninth studio album by American rock band the Used, released through Big Noise on May 19, 2023. The album was produced by John Feldmann.

== Background ==
The band recorded 11 songs in 11 days in October 2021 and 10 songs in 10 days in February 2023 for this album. The first single released from the album is "Numb" and the second was "Giving Up". 11 songs made the album and the remaining 10 were released in June 2024 on an album called MEDZ.

== Track listing ==
All tracks are written by Joseph Bradford, Jepha Howard, Bert McCracken, Dan Whitesides, and John Feldmann, with additional songwriters listed.

Toxic Positivity track listing
No.	Title	Writer(s)	Length
1.	"Worst I've Ever Been"	Rachel West	2:50
2.	"Numb"	West	2:54
3.	"I Hate Everybody"	Samuel Preston	2:48
4.	"Pinky Swear"	Brandon Saller	2:13
5.	"Headspace"	Simon Wilcox	3:35
6.	"Cherry"	Wilcox	2:55
7.	"Dopamine"	Brian Lee	2:37
8.	"Dancing with a Brick Wall"	Wilcox	2:39
9.	"Top of the World"	West	2:56
10.	"House of Sand"	Lee	2:00
11.	"Giving Up"	West	3:10
Total length:			30:37

== Personnel ==
The Used

- Bert McCracken – lead vocals
- Joey Bradford – guitars, backing vocals
- Jepha – bass, backing vocals
- Dan Whitesides – drums, percussion, drum programming, backing vocals

Production

- John Feldmann – production, engineer, mixing (tracks 1–11)
- Connor Daniel – co-production, additional engineer (tracks 1, 4–8, 10)
- Dan Trapp – co-production, additional engineer (tracks 1, 4–5, 7, 9, 11)
- Jake Diab – co-production, additional engineer (track 6)
- Dylan McLean – co-production, engineer, mixing (tracks 1–11)
- Scot Stewart – co-production, engineer, mixing (tracks 1–11)
- Josh Thornberry – additional engineer (tracks 1–11)
- Ted Jensen – mastering (tracks 1–11)
- Cam Rackam – cover art
- Marvin Torres – management
- Sean Akhavan – management
