= Buried Myself Alive =

Single by the Used

from the album The Used
- Released: January 28, 2003
- Recorded: 2002
- Genre: Emo; hard rock; post-hardcore
- Length: 4:02
- Label: Reprise
- Songwriters: Bert McCracken; Quinn Allman; Jeph Howard; Branden Steineckert
- Producer: John Feldmann

The Used singles chronology
"The Taste of Ink" (2002)	"Buried Myself Alive" (2003)	"Blue and Yellow" (2003)

"Buried Myself Alive" is the second single from the Used's self-titled debut album The Used. The single was released on January 28, 2003 and a music video was released around the same time.

== Music video ==
The music video directed by Arni and Kinski features the band playing in an enclosed space. Each band member is in an inescapable situation: Bert is buried alive in a coffin; Quinn is tied upside down in a bedroom; Branden is trapped in a hall of mirrors; and Jeph is stuck and drowning in an underground sewer.

== Track listing ==
US promotional single

1. "Buried Myself Alive" (Radio Edit) – 3:36

== Personnel ==
- John Feldmann – engineer, mixed by, producer

== Charts ==
Chart (2003)	Peak position
US Alternative Airplay (Billboard)	13

== Release history ==
Region	Date	Format	Label
United States	January 28, 2003	Modern rock radio	Reprise
