= Medz =

Compilation album by the Used
- Released: June 21, 2024
- Recorded: October 2021 and February 2023
- Studio: Foxy, Los Angeles
- Genre: Alternative rock; emo-pop; pop rock; post-hardcore
- Length: 29:10
- Label: Big Noise
- Producer: John Feldmann

The Used chronology
Toxic Positivity (2023)	Medz (2024)

Singles from Medz
- 1. "Fuck You" Released: October 21, 2022; 2. "People Are Vomit" Released: February 17, 2023; 3. "Medz" Released: May 17, 2024

Professional ratings
Review scores
Source	Rating
New Noise Magazine	5/5 stars

Medz is a compilation album by the American rock band the Used, released through Big Noise on June 21, 2024. The album contains B-sides from the recording sessions for their previous studio album, Toxic Positivity.

== Background ==
The band went in the studio and recorded 11 songs in 11 days in October 2021 and another 10 songs in 10 days in February 2023. The album is composed of the 10 songs that were recorded but didn't make the previous album. The first single released from the album was "Fuck You" and the second was "People Are Vomit", both of which were released before the previous album, Toxic Positivity, was announced; the third single "Medz" was released when the album was announced.

== Track listing ==
Medz track listing
No.	Title	Writer(s)	Length
1.	"Medz"	Joseph Bradford; Jepha Howard; Robert McCracken; Dan Whitesides; John Feldmann	2:45
2.	"Fuck You"	Bradford; Howard; McCracken; Whitesides; Feldmann; West; Kyle Fishman; Elijah Noll; Nick Bailey	2:57
3.	"People Are Vomit"	Bradford; Howard; McCracken; Whitesides; Feldmann; Lil Aaron	2:52
4.	"Sisyphus"	Bradford; Howard; McCracken; Whitesides; Feldmann	2:59
5.	"Depression Personified"	Bradford; Howard; McCracken; Whitesides; Feldmann; Travis Mills	2:50
6.	"Terrified"	Bradford; Howard; McCracken; Whitesides; Feldmann; Rachel West	3:03
7.	"Before I Leave"	Bradford; Howard; McCracken; Whitesides; Feldmann; Rome	3:18
8.	"Take Yourself Out"	Bradford; Howard; McCracken; Whitesides; Feldmann; Brian Lee	2:55
9.	"Tell Me"	Bradford; Howard; McCracken; Whitesides; Feldmann	2:39
10.	"Pain Is My Therapy"	Bradford; Howard; McCracken; Whitesides; Feldmann	2:48
Total length:			29:10
