= Artwork (album) =

Studio album by the Used
- Released: August 31, 2009
- Recorded: Late 2008 – March 2009
- Genres: Post-hardcore; emo pop; heavy metal
- Length: 43:08
- Label: Reprise
- Producer: Matt Squire

The Used chronology
Lies for the Liars (2007)	Artwork (2009)	Vulnerable (2012)

Singles from Artwork
- 1. "Blood on My Hands" Released: June 30, 2009; 2. "Born To Quit" Released: August 11, 2009; 3. "Something Safe (B-Side)" Released: November 16, 2009; 4. "In A Needle / On The Cross (Save Yourself Mix) {B-Side EP}" Released: March 1, 2010

Artwork is the fourth studio album by American rock band the Used, released through Reprise in the United States and the United Kingdom on August 31, 2009. This is the band's last studio album with Reprise Records before moving to Hopeless Records.

== Recording ==
The Used began writing for Artwork in early 2008, and originally hoped to enter the studio shortly after Kevin Lyman's 2008 "Get a Life Tour" with Weezer front-man Rivers Cuomo as producer of the album. The Used expressed their interest in the raw sound found on Weezer's 1996 album Pinkerton, and hoped to create a similar sound by working with Cuomo. The band ended up working with producer Matt Squire (Panic! at the Disco, Boys Like Girls, The Receiving End of Sirens) and did not enter the studio until the end of 2008. On December 20, 2008, it was mentioned that the band had three or four weeks of recording remaining. In January 2009, the band posted a few videos of the recording process. On March 7, the group finished recording.

The band experienced several changes upon making Artwork. The band changed management within their label Reprise Records. This was the first album with new drummer Dan Whitesides; also the first studio album that was not produced by Goldfinger's frontman John Feldmann. Feldmann had been working with the Used since lead singer Bert McCracken threw a demo on stage during a Goldfinger concert in 2001. Commenting on the band's state prior to these changes, guitarist Quinn Allman felt that, "we were kept in a space with our resources that was creating an essence for our band that wasn't who we truly were."

== Composition ==
Feeling that the band's previous albums had a similar sound, they had hoped to make a brand new genre they refer to as "gross pop" with Artwork. In Alternative Press magazine, McCracken described the new genre, "In the past, we've always kind of brought pop sensibility into heavy rock, but this is going to be all that much more tantalizing and brutal. Our songs are 10 times messier and noisier than they've ever been." The themes of the record include "coming to grips with how much you really hate yourself" and the concept of mortality. McCracken, who had previously lived a "reckless life," recently came to terms with how easy it is to accidentally die after the death of actor Heath Ledger. Allman compared it musically to the group's self-titled album. He described "Blood on My Hands" as a track that "sums up everything about the Used." "Empty with You" is about being okay with feeling lonely, provided there is someone you can share the loneliness with. "Meant to Die" is loosely based on the death of Ledger and not being able to say "sorry," or "I never meant to die" after an accidental death.

This album features Bert McCracken's brother Joseph McCracken singing at two songs.

== Release ==
On March 30, 2009, Artwork was announced for release in June. In March and April, the band performed a handful of shows in the US with the Bled. The band appeared at The Bamboozle festival in early May. At shows prior to the release of Artwork, the Used performed the new track "Blood on My Hands". This song was the first single from the album, and was released on June 30 as a vinyl picture disc and digital download. From July until the album's release, guitar tabs were released for the songs on their official website on a weekly basis. "Blood on My Hands" was released on radio on July 14. In August, the group appeared at the Sonisphere Festival. "Born to Quit" was released as a single on August 11.

After being planned for release in spring, and having an initial release date of September, Artwork was eventually released on August 31 through major label Reprise Records. A special edition CD+DVD package was released, featuring an expanded booklet and a DVD with behind the scenes materials. The CD featured an outtake "In a Needle" and an alternative mix of "On the Cross" as bonus tracks. Following the album's release, the group went on a UK tour in September. In October and November, the group went on a headlining US tour with support from the Almost and Drive A. Every person that purchased their tickets online were sent the demo "Something Safe" and an uncensored music video for "Blood on My Hands". On December 11, a music video premiered for "Empty with You" through Tunelab's website. "Born to Quit" was released to radio on December 15.

== Reception ==
Professional ratings
Aggregate scores
Source	Rating
Metacritic	(56/100)
Review scores
Source	Rating
AllMusic	3/5 stars
Alternative Press	4.5/5 stars
The A.V. Club	C
Billboard	(68/100)
The Metal Forge	7.5/10 stars
PopMatters	3/10 stars
Rock Sound	(9/10)
Rolling Stone	2/5 stars
Spin	(3/10)
Sputnikmusic	4/5 stars

The album opened at #10 on the Billboard 200 with 35,000 copies sold.

Artwork received mostly mixed reviews from music critics. Metacritic has given the album a score of 56 out of 100 based on 8 reviews. On Sputnikmusic, it received a score of 3.3 out of 5 based on all reviews, indicating "great". Sputnikmusic user Trey Spencer awarded the album 4 stars out of 5, summarizing his review by saying, "The Used make some adjustments in their sound and end up with an album that will require a few listens to really sink in."

Alternative Press praised the album highly, saying "On their fourth full-length, the Used have delivered not only the definitive album of their career, but arguably one of the best records you'll hear in 2009." On the other hand, PopMatters said, "After sampling the tasteless, bland delights of Artwork though, I can't imagine many will."

== Track listing ==
All tracks are written by the Used.

No.	Title	Length
1.	"Blood on My Hands"	3:17
2.	"Empty with You"	3:23
3.	"Born to Quit"	3:33
4.	"Kissing You Goodbye"	4:08
5.	"Sold My Soul"	4:12
6.	"Watered Down"	3:57
7.	"On the Cross"	3:07
8.	"Come Undone"	3:23
9.	"Meant to Die"	3:45
10.	"The Best of Me"	4:29
11.	"Men Are All the Same"	5:54

=== Additional track information ===
The Used recorded 18 songs during the Artwork recording session. The 5 b-sides from the session are titled "Mosh n' Church", "In a Needle", "Something Safe", "Burning Down The House" "On The Cross (Save Yourself Mix)" and "Sold My Soul (Time Lapse Mix)". The b-sides were released as downloadable bonus tracks for pre-ordering the album, buying tickets to the album tour, and later on digital music stores. A remix version of "On the Cross" was also released on digital music stores and an alternative version of "Sold My Soul" was posted to the band's YouTube page. "Burning Down The House" is a cover of the song by Talking Heads and is available on the Transformers Revenge Of The Fallen soundtrack and Covered, A Revolution Of Sound.

iTunes deluxe edition
No.	Title	Length
12.	"On My Own" (acoustic from PureVolume Sessions)	3:13
13.	"Lunacy Fringe" (acoustic from PureVolume Sessions)	4:18
14.	"Empty with You" (acoustic from PureVolume Sessions)	4:01
15.	"Mosh n' Church" (demo)	3:21

Limited edition
No.	Title	Length
12.	"In a Needle"	3:56
13.	"On the Cross" (Save Yourself Mix)	3:04

Ticket pre-sale'
No.	Title	Length
12.	"Something Safe" (demo)	3:14
13.	"Blood on My Hands" (uncensored music video)

Limited Edition Bonus DVD
No.	Title	Length
1.	"Behind the Scenes"
2.	"Making of the Album"
3.	"Exclusive Interviews"

Japanese Bonus Tracks
No.	Title	Length
12.	"Mosh n' Church" (Demo)	3:21

== Personnel ==
The Used

- Bert McCracken – lead vocals, piano; drawings
- Jeph Howard – bass, backing vocals
- Quinn Allman – guitar, backing vocals; photography
- Dan Whitesides – drums, percussion, backing vocals

Additional personnel

- Joseph McCracken – vocals on "Blood on My Hands", screaming vocals on "Meant to Die"
- Jed Bleecker – vocals on "Blood on My Hands"
- "Killer" Dayton Killian – vocals on "Blood on My Hands"

Production

- Matt Squire – production, sound engineer
- Neal Avron – mixing
- Ted Jensen – mastering
- Edward Colver – assistant
- Nicolas Fournier – mixing assistant
- Bill Appleberry – digital editing
- Paul Rayner-Brown – photography, artwork
- Frank Maddocks – design, cover photo, creative director
- Craig Aaronson – A&R

== Charts ==
Chart performance
Chart (2009)	Peak position
Australian Albums (ARIA)	17
Canadian Albums (Billboard)	10
Scottish Albums (Official Charts)	97
UK Albums (Official Charts)	63
UK Rock & Metal Albums (Official Charts)	2
US Billboard 200	10
US Indie Store Album Sales (Billboard)	4
US Top Alternative Albums (Billboard)	3
US Top Hard Rock Albums (Billboard)	2
US Top Rock Albums (Billboard)	5

== Release history ==
Standard edition

Region	Date	Label	Format	Catalogue
Australia	November 19, 2009	Reprise	CD	9362497658
Japan	September 9, 2009	Reprise	CD	WPCR13553
United Kingdom	August 31, 2009	Reprise	CD	9362497658
United States	August 31, 2009	Reprise	CD	519904
United States	August 31, 2009	Reprise	12" vinyl	519292

Limited edition

Region	Date	Label	Format	Catalogue
Australia	September 4, 2009	Reprise	CD+DVD	9362497522
United Kingdom	August 31, 2009	Reprise	CD+DVD	9362497522
United States	August 31, 2009	Reprise	CD+DVD	5194912
