= The Used (album) =

Studio album by the Used
- Released: June 25, 2002
- Recorded: 2002
- Studios: Foxy Studios, Marina del Rey, California; Olympic Studios, London, England
- Genres: Post-hardcore; emo; melodic hardcore
- Length: 47:16
- Label: Reprise
- Producer: John Feldmann

The Used chronology
Demos from the Basement (2001)	The Used (2002)	Maybe Memories (2003)

Singles from The Used
- 1. "The Taste of Ink" Released: September 2002; 2. "Buried Myself Alive" Released: January 28, 2003; 3. "Blue and Yellow" Released: May 19, 2003

The Used is the debut studio album by American rock band the Used, released on June 25, 2002, through Reprise Records. The album has been certified platinum by the RIAA in 2019.

== Music and lyrics ==
The album's sound has been described as screamo, emo, post-hardcore and melodic hardcore. It has also been categorized as "scene music" by Loudwire. The album also contains elements of hard rock and heavy metal, as well as ballads. AllMusic stated that some of the material "could be played on MTV beside Creed and Vertical Horizon." Some of the material has drawn comparisons to Fuel. Bert McCracken's harsh vocals have drawn comaprisons to Perry Farrell.

The album's lyrical themes include youth, suicide, romance, marriage proposal, frustration. "The Taste of Ink" is "pretty much about being frustrated and maybe biting on a pen", according to McCracken. McCracken said "Buried Myself Alive" was "about a girl. It's about drugs. It's about loss. It's about being alive, about living". "A Box Full of Sharp Objects" was inspired in part by McCracken's past experiences with drugs. He said it was about "drugs and alcohol and loss and love ... and just being stoked that things are always going to get better or always gonna get worse and that's such a great thing". "Blue and Yellow" is about McCracken and Allman's friendship, as the latter explains: "When the band started to really pick up ... we were almost not being friends anymore because we were focusing so much time on the band and not on each other".

The word "fuck" is used frequently on the album, despite the absence of a parental advisory sticker on the front cover.

== Background ==
Jeph Howard and Branden Steineckert played in a local act that performed shows with another band, which featured Bert McCracken. The former band soon broke up; Howard, Steineckert and Quinn Allman formed a new band, Dumb Luck in October 1999. Shortly afterwards, the group split up. The Used formed in January 2001 with Allman on guitar, Howard on bass and Steineckert on drums. The trio, who were in need of a vocalist, held many fruitless auditions. According to Howard, they "remembered [about McCracken] and called him. After that, everything just fell into place."

Following a period of homelessness, the group recorded a demo release, Demos from the Basement. Allman said the group listened back to the demos "over and over, getting stoked talking about what we wanted to do with them". The group eventually gave a copy to John Feldmann of Goldfinger, "but he would tell us they totally sucked", Allman added. The band subsequently honed their sound before Feldmann flew the group out to Los Angeles, where they played label showcases without any success initially. However, they soon began to receive offers from record companies. Soon afterwards, the group signed to major label Reprise Records in late 2001. McCracken said the label staff "really seemed to get what we're about ... offer[ing] us 100% creative and artistic freedom".

== Production ==
The Used was recorded at Foxy Studios in Marina del Rey, California with Feldmann as the producer. The group recorded piano parts in London at Olympic Studios. Feldmann acted as an engineer with assistance from Mark Blewett and Donny Campion. Feldmann contributed backing vocals to "Bulimic" and "Greener with the Scenery", the latter of which also included additional backing vocals from Carmen Daye. String arrangements on "Greener with the Scenery" and "On My Own" were done by Nick Ingman. Feldmann mixed the recordings, while Joe Gastwirt mastered them at Ocean View Digital Mastering. Steineckert said that "[the] one thing we all took from [working with Feldmann] ... [was] to not lose yourself through everything".

== Release ==
The Used was released on June 25, 2002 through Reprise Records. During the summer, the group performed on the Warped Tour and Ozzfest touring festivals. Despite never having been released as a single, "A Box Full of Sharp Objects" received airplay starting in July, and a band-directed music video was in rotation at TV stations. In late August, a music video was filmed for "The Taste of Ink". In October and November, the band supported Box Car Racer on their headlining tour of the US. In early December, the band performed at KROQ-FM's Almost Acoustic Christmas festival. In January 2003, the band went on a headlining West Coast tour of the US with support from Taking Back Sunday, New Transit Direction and the Blood Brothers. "Buried Myself Alive" was released to radio on January 28. The following day, the band posted the music video to the song on their website. The video was directed by Ami & Kinkski, and features McCracken "play[ing] with fire while the band wreaks havoc", according to Kludge.

The Used embarked on a headlining tour of the US East Coast in February 2003 with support from Finch, the Movielife and My Chemical Romance. This was followed by a co-headlining US with Finch, with support from Steel Train and From Autumn to Ashes. "The Taste of Ink" was released as a single on March 11. In March and April, the band went on tour with Coheed and Cambria. In April and May, the group went on tour with Thrice. Two of these shows formed part of MTV's Campus Invasion tour. "Blue and Yellow" was released to radio on May 19. From June to August, the group performed at Warped Tour. In July, the group released a CD/DVD album, Maybe Memories. The CD included live versions of "Maybe Memories", "Say Days Ago", "A Box Full of Sharp Objects" and "On My Own", Japanese-exclusive bonus track "Just a Little", a demo of "Bulimic", and "Sometimes I Just Go for It", a track that had been recorded during the piano sessions in London.

== Reception and legacy ==
Professional ratings
Review scores
Source	Rating
AllMusic	3/5 stars
Alternative Press	4/5 stars
CMJ New Music Report	Favorable
Exclaim!	Favorable
Melodic	3/5 stars
Punknews.org	3/5 stars
Q	link
Sputnikmusic	5/5

Upon its release, the album received positive reviews from critics, with praise being directed primarily to the instrumentation. The album has since become recognized as a landmark album of the emocore and screamo genres. Many bands such as Escape the Fate, Crown the Empire and A Static Lullaby have cited the album as a major influence on their sounds. NME listed the album as one of "20 Emo Albums That Have Resolutely Stood The Test Of Time". Journalists Leslie Simon and Trevor Kelley included the album in their list of the most essential emo releases in their book Everybody Hurts: An Essential Guide to Emo Culture (2007). Alternative Press ranked "A Box Full of Sharp Objects" at number 45 and "The Taste of Ink" at number 21 on their list of the best 100 singles from the 2000s. Tom Weaver of Casey has expressed admiration for the album. Additionally, some consider it to be an important "scene album".

== Commercial performance ==
The Used debuted at number 50 on the Billboard Heatseekers Albums chart in the August 17 issue. It later rose to number one in the November 16 issue and gained "Heatseekers Impact" status when the release moved from number 106 to number 96 on the Billboard 200 chart. It eventually peaked at number 63 on the chart. Reprise Records' marketing director Xavier Ramos said the label's market strategy for the group was to let their fan base build through touring. He said, "We put them on the road soon after we signed them. Our philosophy was that this is a good live band, and they'll win fans over show by show". The Used also charted at number 34 in Australia and number 87 in Germany. It was certified gold in Australia and Canada, and platinum in the US. "The Taste of Ink" charted at number 19 on the Alternative Songs chart and number 52 in the UK. "Buried Myself Alive" charted at number 13 on the Alternative Songs chart. "Blue and Yellow" charted at number 23 on the Alternative Songs chart.

By July 2003, the album had sold 500,000 copies.

== Track listing ==
All songs written by the Used.

No.	Title	Length
1.	"Maybe Memories"	2:55
2.	"The Taste of Ink"	3:28
3.	"Bulimic"	3:20
4.	"Say Days Ago"	3:17
5.	"Poetic Tragedy"	3:44
6.	"Buried Myself Alive"	4:02
7.	"A Box Full of Sharp Objects"	2:56
8.	"Blue and Yellow"	3:21
9.	"Greener with the Scenery"	3:37
10.	"Noise and Kisses"	2:49
11.	"On My Own"	2:43
12.	"Pieces Mended" (ends at 3:09; hidden tracks "Polly" and "Choke Me" start at 8:01)	11:00
Total length:		47:16

Enhanced CD bonus content
No.	Title	Length
13.	"A Box Full of Sharp Objects" (music video)	3:03
14.	"The Used Interview" (studio footage)	1:46

Japanese bonus track
No.	Title	Length
13.	"Just a Little"	3:28
Total length:		50:44

=== Additional track information ===
The Used recorded 14 songs during the self titled recording session. The two b-sides from the session are titled "Choke Me" and "Just a Little". "Choke Me" was released as a hidden bonus track on the album and later on Shallow Believer and "Just a Little" was released as a bonus track in Japan only and later on Maybe Memories.

== Personnel ==
Personnel per booklet.

The Used

- Bert McCracken – vocals, piano, additional guitars
- Branden Steineckert – drums, backing vocals
- Quinn Allman – guitars, backing vocals
- Jeph Howard – bass, backing vocals

Additional musicians

- John Feldmann – backing vocals on "Bulimic" and "Greener with the Scenery"
- Carmen Daye – additional backing vocals on "Greener with the Scenery"
- Nick Ingman – string arrangements on "Poetic Tragedy", "Greener with the Scenery" and "On My Own"

Production

- John Feldmann – producer, engineer, mixing
- Mark Blewett – assistant engineer
- Donny Campion – assistant engineer
- Joe Gastwirt – mastering
- P.R. Brown – art direction, photography, design
- Gina Keeler – additional line illustrations

== Charts ==
2003–2005 chart performance for The Used
Chart (2003–2005)	Peak position
Australian Albums (ARIA)	34
Canadian Albums (Nielsen SoundScan)	192
German Albums (Offizielle Top 100)	87
UK Rock & Metal Albums (Official Charts)	19
US Billboard 200	63

2022 chart performance for The Used
Chart (2022)	Peak position
US Indie Store Album Sales (Billboard)	18

== Certifications ==
Certifications for The Used
Region	Certification	Certified units/sales
Australia (ARIA)	Gold	35,000^{^}
Canada (Music Canada)	Gold	50,000^{^}
United Kingdom (BPI)	Silver	60,000^{‡}
United States (RIAA)	Platinum	1,000,000^{‡}
^{^} Shipments figures based on certification alone.^{‡} Sales+streaming figures based on certification alone.
