= Justin Shekoski =

American guitarist and songwriter (born 1983)

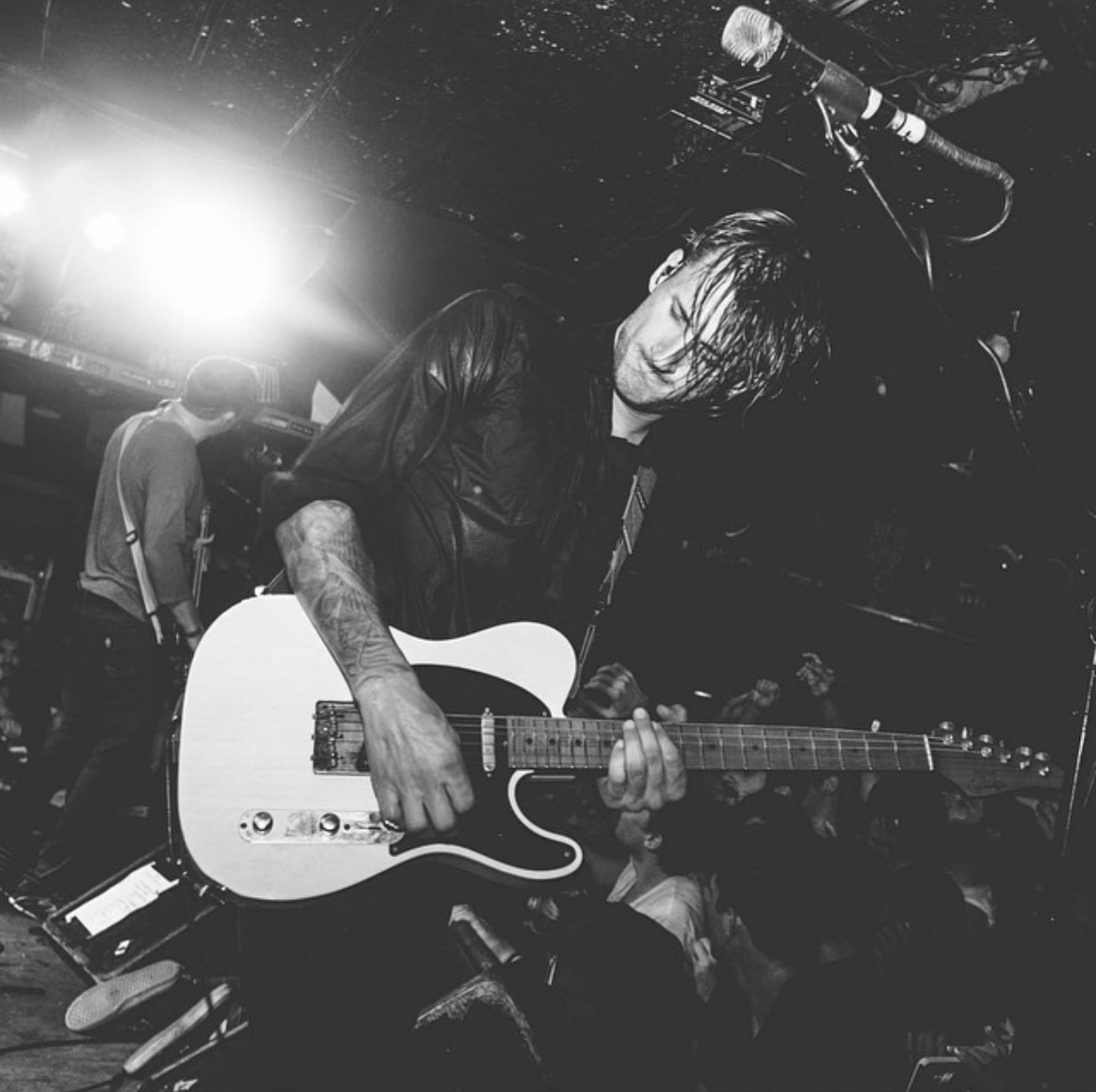
- Shekoski performing in 2014

Background information
- Born: Justin Paul Hollis Shekoski; June 11, 1983 (age 42); Orange County, California, U.S.
- Genres: Emo; post-hardcore; punk rock; alternative rock
- Occupations: Musician; songwriter
- Instruments: Guitar; vocals
- Years active: 2003–present
- Formerly of: Saosin; The Used
- Website: justinshekoski.com

Justin Paul Hollis Shekoski (born June 11, 1983) is an American guitarist, songwriter, and vocalist, best known for being the former lead guitarist, songwriter, and backing vocalist of Saosin and the Used. He has cited guitarists John Petrucci and Paul Gilbert as some of his main inspirations. Shekoski is also known for his guitar playing style onstage, including "guitar spins," which involves spinning his guitar over his left shoulder multiple times, subsequently catching it mid-air, and continuing to play.

== Career ==
Shekoski, along with Beau Burchell, Anthony Green, and Zach Kennedy, is a founding member of the post-hardcore band Saosin, having been with the group since their 2003 extended play Translating the Name. In February 2015, Quinn Allman, the lead guitarist for post-hardcore band the Used, began a year-long hiatus from performing with the group, and Shekoski was selected to fill in for him. The Used bassist Jeph Howard cited their friendship with the entirety of Saosin and Shekoski specifically as the reasons he was selected. In November 2015, the Used announced that Allman would be permanently leaving the band, and that Shekoski would be replacing him as an official member.

Shortly after that announcement, Shekoski revealed that he had been removed from Saosin "a few months [prior to November 2015]" for what he described as "questionable reasons". Shekoski expressed surprise at his removal, saying "One thing I can be sure of is that I could not and would not have done anything differently over the past years. The shows were some of the best we have ever played. It truly seemed as if everyone was happy and positivity was at an all-time high. I was proud of the new music we were creating and to be turned away right before we tracked the record that we had spent years writing and our entire career working towards is saddening at best and angering at worst. If anyone's heart or commitment to Saosin could have possibly been in question, it certainly wasn't mine, ever."

In January 2018, following a business dispute regarding payment after the release of the Used's The Canyon and subsequent promotional tour, Shekoski was dismissed from the band. In March 2018, the Used removed Shekoski from their band members section on Facebook and edited him out of their promotional photos.

Shekoski received critical acclaim for his work on The Canyon by the Alternative Press, stating "[Shekoski] has breathed new life into the songwriting." Other various music critics positively praised The Canyon for its unique sound with Billboard stating the album was the Used's most prolific and most important to date.

In 2019, Shekoski filed suit against The Used for royalties and damages. The dispute was resolved amicably and settled out of court.

== Discography ==
with Saosin

- Translating the Name (2003)
- Saosin (2005)
- Saosin (2006)
- Come Close (2006)
- The Grey (2008)
- In Search of Solid Ground (2009)

with The Used

- Live & Acoustic at the Palace (2015)
- The Canyon (2017)
