= The Used =

American rock band

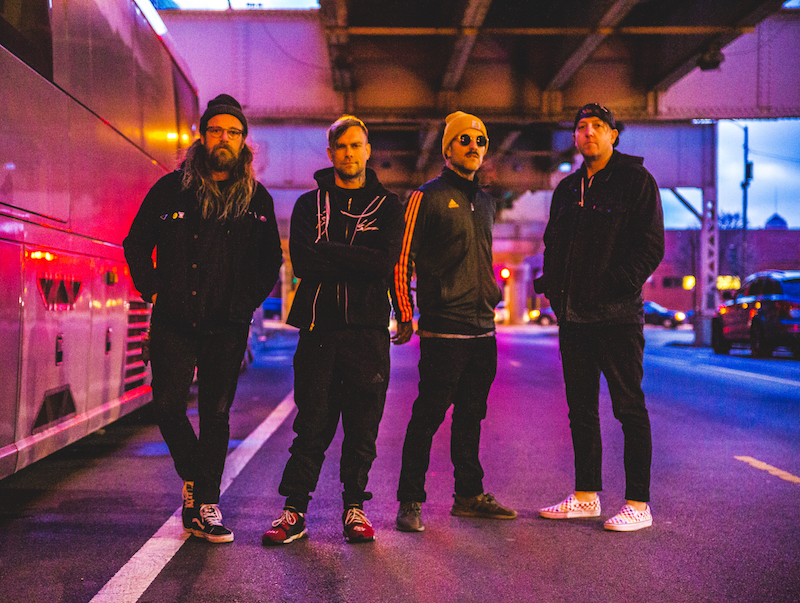
- The Used in 2020

Background information
- Origin: Orem, Utah, U.S.
- Genres: Post-hardcore; emo; pop-punk; screamo; alternative rock
- Years active: 2000–present
- Labels: Big Noise; Hopeless; Reprise
- Spinoffs: Robbietheused
- Members: Bert McCracken; Jepha Howard; Dan Whitesides; Joey Bradford
- Past members: Branden Steineckert; Quinn Allman; Justin Shekoski
- Website: theused.net

The Used is an American rock band from Orem, Utah, formed in 2000. The group consists of vocalist Bert McCracken, bassist Jepha, drummer Dan Whitesides, and guitarist Joey Bradford. Former members include Quinn Allman, Branden Steineckert, and Justin Shekoski.

The band rose to fame in June 2002 after releasing their self-titled debut album. They followed up with their second album, In Love and Death, in September 2004 and their third album, Lies for the Liars, in May 2007. Shallow Believer, an EP that featured most of the band's B-sides, was released in February 2008. Their fourth studio album, Artwork, was released in August 2009. A fifth album, Vulnerable, was released in March 2012. In July 2013 they released another EP, titled The Ocean of the Sky. Their sixth album, Imaginary Enemy, released in April 2014. Their seventh studio album, The Canyon, was released in October 2017. Their eighth studio album, Heartwork, was released in April 2020 and a deluxe version with the B-sides from the recording sessions was released in September 2021. Their ninth studio album, Toxic Positivity was released in May 2023 and the B-sides from it were released on the album Medz in June 2024.

The Used have enjoyed commercial success with their albums achieving gold and platinum statuses in many countries worldwide. Alternative Press Magazine conferred the title of "kings of the 2000s emo scene" on the band.

== History ==
=== The formation, The Used, and In Love & Death (2000–2005) ===
The Used formed in the summer of 2000 with Branden Steineckert, Quinn Allman, Jeph Howard, and Bert McCracken. The band began composing songs without lyrics prior to McCracken joining. They held auditions for vocalists at Howard's residence, but were not satisfied with any of the auditions, describing them as terrible. Allman then asked McCracken if he was interested in joining the band. McCracken was impressed with their material, and after being given some music, he wrote the lyrics to what would become "Maybe Memories". He returned the next day to record a demo version of the song and was then officially confirmed as the band's vocalist. During the early days of the band, members suffered from poverty, homelessness, and substance abuse, panhandling for change in order to buy food. They decided upon the name "Used" after friends claimed they felt "used" when contact with the band members waned as they became more engrossed in the project.

They continued to write songs together and recorded a demo album in drummer Steineckert's bedroom titled Demos from the Basement. According to band interviews, the closet of Steineckert's bedroom had been repurposed as a recording booth. Steineckert sent their songs to producer John Feldmann from the ska group Goldfinger. On hearing the song "A Box Full of Sharp Objects", Feldman flew the band to Los Angeles on his own expense and helped them find a record label. They played for various record executives, but received little interest. Eventually, after sending copies of their demo to many record companies, they began to receive offers. They decided to sign to Reprise Records the first week of January 2002 which was only 1 year after the band had formed.

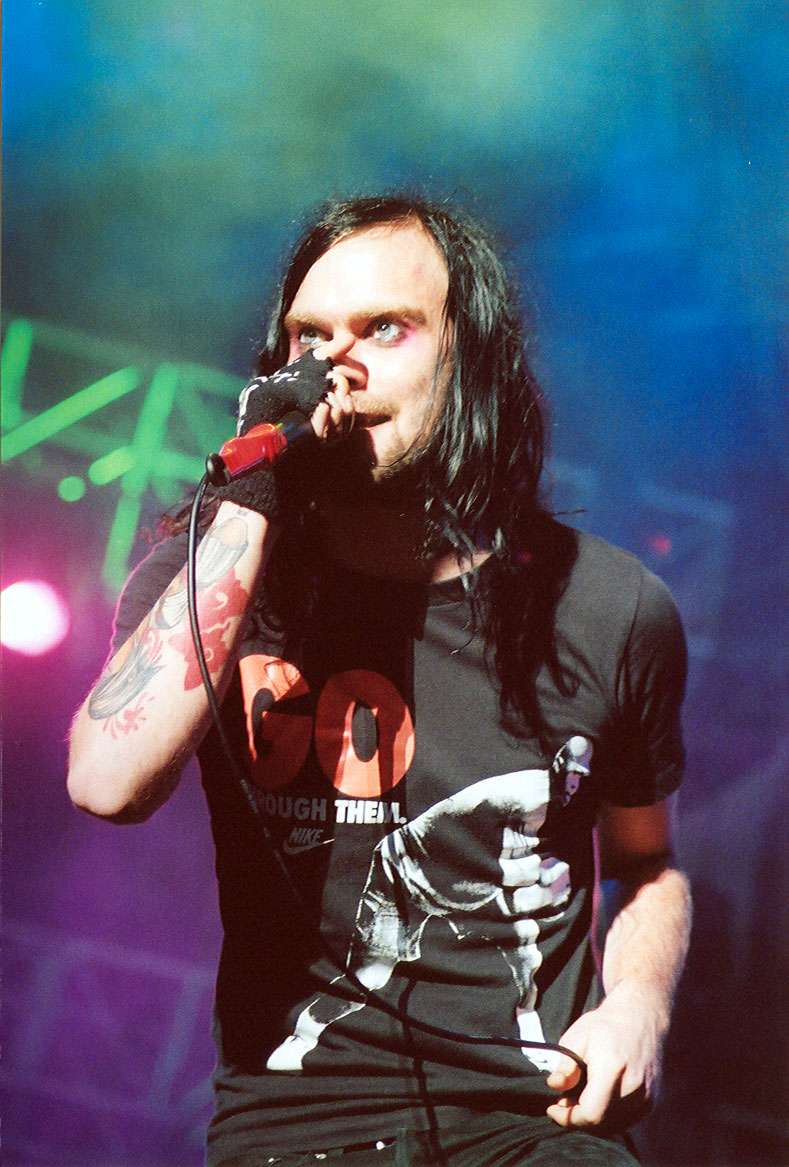
Bert McCracken performing at the Street Scene (San Diego music festival) with the Used in 2005

In 2002, it was discovered that a Boston band had already trademarked the name "Used". The band decided to add "the" to their name, thus becoming "the Used". Their self-titled debut album, produced by John Feldmann, was released on June 25, 2002, to critical acclaim. The album featured the singles: "The Taste of Ink", "Buried Myself Alive", and "Blue and Yellow", with all three entering the charts and the album being certified platinum. They went on to play Warped Tour, Ozzfest, and Projekt Revolution, as well as Box Car Racer's first and only tour. During these tours, they employed a touring guitarist named Greg Bester. He was later forced to return to his home country when he couldn't get a working visa. The band received much recognition when Bert McCracken dated Kelly Osbourne and appeared on an episode of the TV show The Osbournes titled "Beauty and the Bert". In July 2003, they released a compilation CD/DVD combo package titled Maybe Memories. The CD features live, rare, previously unreleased tracks, and demo material, while the DVD features the history of the band, member bios, and part of a live concert. Maybe Memories has been certified platinum.

In 2004, lead vocalist McCracken's ex-girlfriend died of a drug overdose while pregnant with his child. Their second studio album was thus named In Love and Death, released as a reference to the tragedy McCracken dealt with during the recording. The song "Hard to Say" was a reference to McCracken's girlfriend; although the song was written years earlier, its dedication was only then declared. In Love and Death received very positive reviews and spawned three singles: "Take It Away", "All That I've Got" (which earned them their first MuchMusic Video Award nomination), and "I Caught Fire", before being re-released in 2005. "Under Pressure" (a Queen and David Bowie cover song performed with My Chemical Romance) was featured as a bonus track on later pressings. The album has been certified platinum. After finishing up an international tour for the album, they took about eight months off before starting to work on their next album.

=== Lies for the Liars, Shallow Believer, Artwork, and Vulnerable (2006–2012) ===
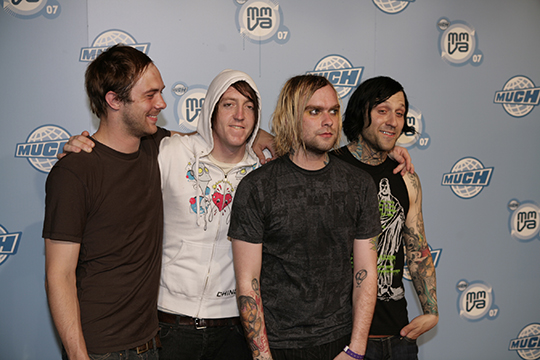
The Used at the iHeartRadio Much Music Video Awards in 2007

On September 12, 2006, the Used announced that Steineckert was no longer a member of the band. They said they felt they needed to move forward without him, and that there was a personality conflict between Steineckert and another band member. In late 2006, it was announced drummer Dan Whitesides of The New Transit Direction would replace Steineckert. Steineckert has since joined Rancid.

On February 6, 2007, they released a live album, Berth, which includes a DVD that features video of their performance at the Taste of Chaos 2005 tour in Vancouver and a CD that features it on audio. The DVD also includes a biography of the band and four music videos. The biography depicts the band after the release of Maybe Memories, leading into the creation of In Love and Death. The sale of Berth lead it to be certified as gold. They spent most of the early part of 2007 on the Taste of Chaos tour before their third album, Lies for the Liars, was released May 22, 2007. They headlined the Give It a Name festival. In June, they played the MuchMusic Video Awards for the first time ever, and received their second nomination for Best International Group Video, for "The Bird and the Worm". They were scheduled to play Warped Tour in June and July, in support of their album, but were forced to cancel due to McCracken's vocal cord surgery. After McCracken recovered, the band played the Reading and Leeds festivals in August, and went on to tour the United States in September. Lies for the Liars charted in the top five in more than seven countries, and featured the singles: "The Bird and the Worm" and "Pretty Handsome Awkward". Although Whitesides had been chosen as the new drummer, Dean Butterworth of Good Charlotte recorded drums for the album. The six-month recording process was the longest the band had ever undertaken. Lies for the Liars generally received mixed to positive reviews. Originally, Lies for the Liars was expected to be a double-album. Nineteen songs were recorded, but they instead decided to save the songs for a future release. The album has been certified gold.

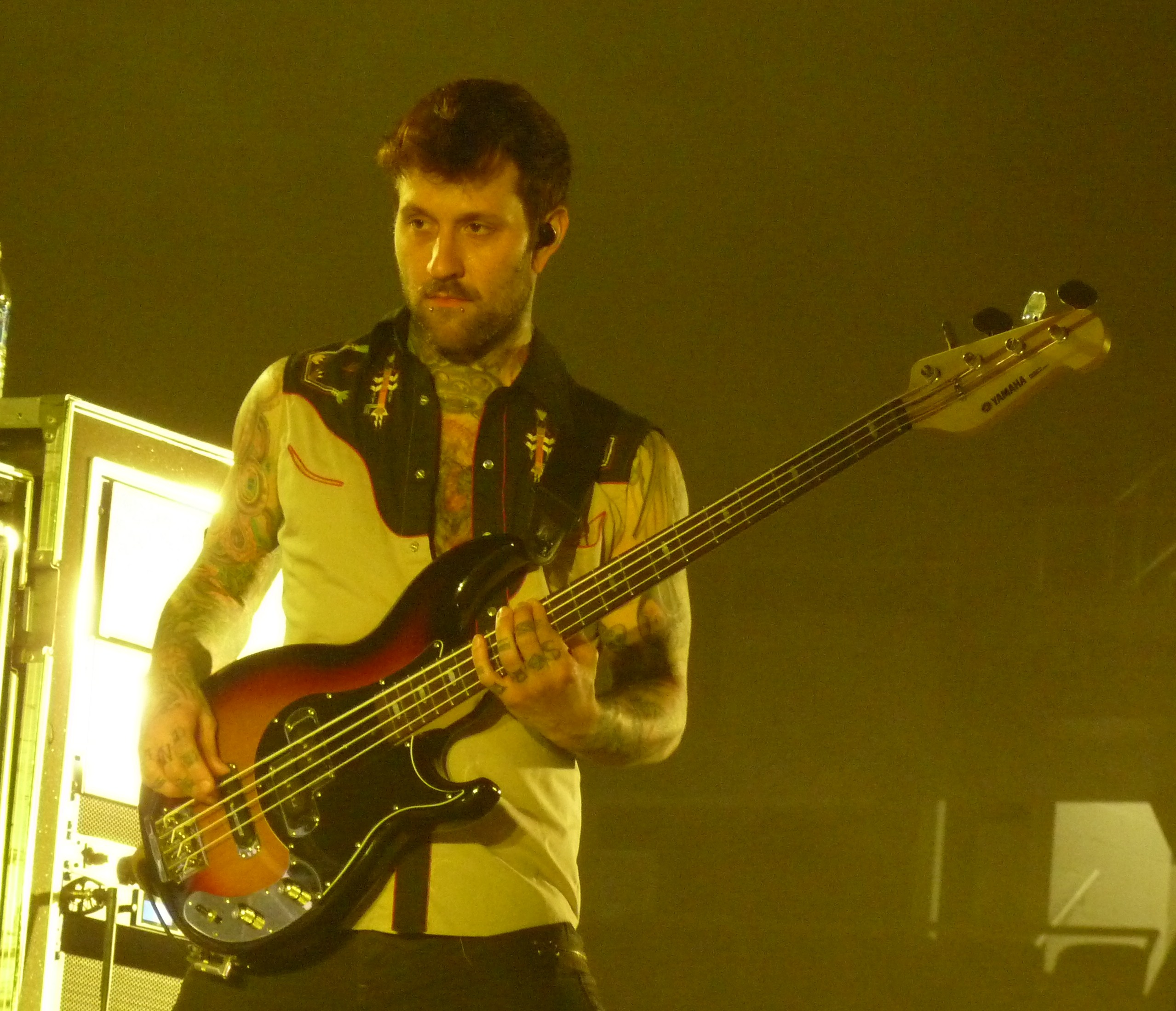
Jeph Howard in 2009

On May 19, 2008, they released Shallow Believer, an EP containing the band's B-sides. It was only released on digital music stores and it has charted No. 14 on iTunes' Top 100 albums. They worked on Artwork, their fourth studio album, throughout 2008. They took several breaks while working on the album to headline the inaugural Get a Life Tour and the Spare the Air Festival in California. The album was produced by Panic! at the Disco's producer Matt Squire, making this their first studio album not produced by John Feldmann. It was also their first studio album to feature Whitesides as the drummer. In Alternative Press, McCracken stated "In the past, we've always kind of brought pop sensibility into heavy rock, but this is going to be all that much more tantalizing and brutal. Our songs are ten times messier and noisier than they've ever been." McCracken explained the meaning of the album, saying, "This record is about coming to grips with how much you really hate yourself and knowing you can never hate yourself to the full extent, so you're free to hate yourself as much as you want to". McCracken went on to say "we [have not] been this excited about an album since our self titled back in 2002." The album released along with a DVD for the pre-order and first run of the album in stores. A cover version of "Burning Down the House" by Talking Heads was released on the cover compilation album Covered, A Revolution in Sound, and was also featured in Transformers: Revenge of the Fallen – The Album. They played at The Bamboozle in May 2009. The single "Blood on My Hands" was released on iTunes in June, and was streamable for one day on the band's website. On July 21, the pre-order was available. Artwork became available worldwide on August 31, 2009. The band played a major U.S. tour in October and November 2009 with supporting bands The Almost and Drive A, and another in early 2010 with Atreyu and Drive A. They later joined an arena tour supporting Three Days Grace in Canada. The band premiered the music video for the song "Empty with You" on December 9, 2009, via Twitter. In April 2010, they began another US tour along with Chiodos and New Medicine.

In April 2010, they cancelled their upcoming international tour dates and also began writing material for a follow-up to Artwork. Recording and officially releasing the new album was significantly delayed after leaving Reprise Records—their record label group of ten years. According to Howard, "We were kind of waiting to see if we were going to do this record on Warner or not. We kind of had to wait and see what happened about that before we started recording." They founded their own record label in 2011 after parting ways with Reprise Records, a division of Warner. The label was dubbed "Dental Records", and they planned to release their fifth studio album, Vulnerable, in February 2012 on it.

By December 2011 the release plans for Vulnerable had changed. Their first choice, "Dental Records", was already taken, so the group quickly came up with a different name instead, Anger Music Group. Vulnerable was released March 26, 2012. The album's spawned three singles; "I Come Alive", "Put Me Out", and "Hands and Faces".

In support of Vulnerable, they embarked on a North American headlining tour in May and June 2012, and also performed on the main stage of Warped Tour 2012 in June and July 2012. In June 2012, they were forced to cancel all scheduled Canadian tour dates due to McCracken's criminal record. McCracken said he would not be allowed entry into the country for ten years because of some "teensy, eensy misdemeanors", including trespassing, from many years earlier.

=== The Ocean of the Sky, Imaginary Enemy, and The Canyon (2013–2017) ===
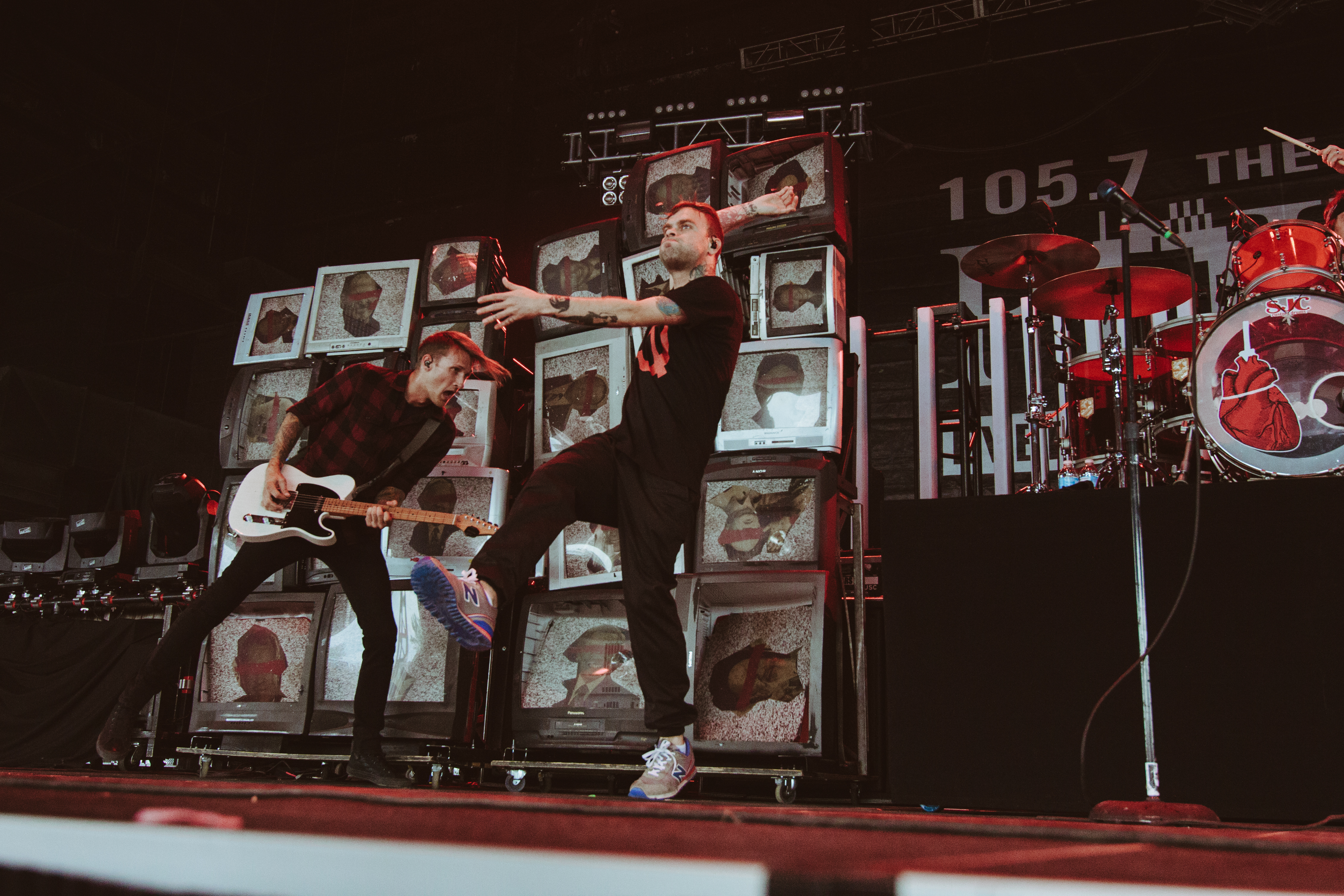
Justin Shekoski and Bert McCracken performing in 2015.

Sub City (Hopeless Records' non-profit 501(c) organization) announced on November 9, 2012, that they, with support from We Came As Romans, Crown the Empire, and Mindflow, would headline the annual nationwide charity tour will circle the US through February, showcasing some of the best bands in music today while raising funds and awareness for It Gets Better Project and the concept that we can all help play a part in making a positive impact. The band's fifth studio album was re-issued as a two-disc set titled Vulnerable (II) on January 22, 2013. On March 11, 2013, the band released a music video for the single "Hands and Faces".

In June 2013 they announced, The Ocean of the Sky, and the EP was released the following month.

In mid-January 2014, the band revealed their sixth studio album, Imaginary Enemy. It was released on April 1, 2014, through their label GAS Union. The album was greatly influenced by McCracken's daughter.

In early February 2015, it was announced that guitarist Quinn Allman parted ways with the band for a one-year hiatus. Saosin's guitarist Justin Shekoski became his replacement as touring member for subsequent tours from February 2015. They toured the United Kingdom in February 2015 with support from the Landscapes. On November 19, 2015, they announced that Allman amicably parted ways with the band permanently and then touring member Shekoski was welcomed as his permanent replacement. However, Allman later revealed that he had intended to return to the band for the anniversary tour, and his departure was a one-sided decision by the band which he became aware of via the band's Facebook announcement.

The band released a live album, Live & Acoustic at the Palace, in April 2016. It was recorded at a show on October 11, 2015, at the Palace in Los Angeles. It is the first release without guitarist Quinn Allman, and first to feature new guitarist Justin Shekoski. The live CD/DVD hit #11 on Billboard's Current Album's chart, and recorded the band's intimate performance with a four-piece string quartet, harpist, piano player, percussion and a three-piece gospel choir. On Shekoski's addition to the band, in an interview with Billboard, lead singer Bert McCracken stated Shekoski's "lust for life and passion for art is inspiring. It's been a fire underneath The Used. It's a new chapter of a brand new book" and "since Justin became a part of the Used it's been nothing but exciting for the next step." The band members were inspired following the live recording of Live & Acoustic at the Palace, and wanted to reflect the live experience in their new album. They spent all of 2016 touring Europe, North America, and Australia to celebrate their 15-year anniversary. In every city they played back to back shows in two nights, playing songs from their self titled album on the first night, and In Love and Death on the second night in their entirety. Following the success of the first leg of the tour, the band announced they will embark on a second leg of the anniversary tour.

Their seventh studio album, The Canyon, was released on October 27, 2017, with a video for the song "Over and Over Again" being released prior to the album. The music video was directed by Lisa Mann and included dance choreography with bright visuals. The album was produced by Ross Robinson, and was recorded using analog equipment with no click-tracks or backing vocals to achieve a raw sound. McCracken and Shekoski bonded over the loss of their loved ones, including McCracken's friend, Traegan, and Shekoski's late father who died from a car accident about ten years prior, with McCracken stating in an interview with the Alternative Press, "We've never had a more connected time creatively, I've never felt closer to peace and my understanding of peace being this aggressive selfless drive to create something, to explode into history as one, as all, not as an individual. So many, just monuments and huge moments, that when we were done, I was overwhelmed."

The album received positive reception following its release, with Alternative Press claiming the album has "A vibrancy and vulnerability not felt since the Used's 2002 self-titled debut", and stating that the band's new guitarist Justin Shekoski "has breathed new life into the songwriting". McCracken's delivery of the lyrics coupled with Shekoski's melodies and riffs, showed "The Used have fully realized their wild imagination" and critics noted "this collection of songs are more compelling and moving than anything heard previously from the band." The album appears in AllMusic's 2017 Year In Review: Favorite Punk Albums, Alternative Press's The 40 best albums of 2017, Drowned in Sound's Album of 2017: Staff edit and Kerrang!'s Albums of 2017 lists.

In October and November 2017, the group went on a headlining US tour with support from Glassjaw. The band also promoted the new album with acoustic performances at Huntington Beach, and Amoeba Music. Shekoski and McCracken were praised by Rolling Stone for their "powerful acoustic performance".

=== Heartwork (2018–2021) ===
In January 2018, following a business dispute regarding payment after the release of The Canyon and subsequent promotional tour, Shekoski was dismissed from the band. In March 2018, they removed Justin Shekoski from their band members section on Facebook and edited him out of their promotional photos. At the end of April 2018, Joey Bradford of the band 'Hell or Highwater' appeared in videos of the band practicing for upcoming tour dates. In 2019, Shekoski filed suit against The Used for royalties and damages. The dispute was resolved amicably and settled out of court.

They released a limited edition vinyl EP, Live from Maida Vale, on Record Store Day 2019. It is the first release to feature Joey Bradford on guitar.

After the release, they signed with a new record label called Big Noise Music Group. They headlined the first annual Rockstar energy drink Disrupt tour, which was intended to fill the void left by the change of concept of the Warped Tour. The band started recording the album in June and finished recording it after the Disrupt Festival tour in November. The album was produced by John Feldmann who produced most of their studio albums. The first single and music video from the upcoming album, "Blow Me", was released on December 6. A second single and video "Paradise Lost, a poem by John Milton" was released February 7. A third single and video "Cathedral Bell" was released April 17. The album, Heartwork, was released on April 24, 2020. A year and a half later on September 10, 2021, the band released a deluxe version of Heartwork with 11 b-sides recorded during the session.

=== Toxic Positivity, Medz, and 25th anniversary (2021–present) ===
The band recorded 11 songs in 11 days in October 2021 and 10 songs in 10 days in February 2023 for their next album. The single "Fuck You" was released on October 21, 2022. Another single, "People Are Vomit", was released on February 17, 2023. The album's lead single, "Numb", was released on April 20, 2023. "Giving Up" was released as the second single on May 17, 2023. The album, Toxic Positivity, was released May 19, 2023. The remaining songs from the session were released on a B-sides compilation album called Medz on June 21, 2024.

McCracken released a self-titled solo album, under the moniker Robbietheused, on October 25, 2024. In 2025, the band undertook a world tour commemorating 25 years as a band, performing their first three albums in full across a variety of cities and countries. The band also announced two of their biggest-ever shows for 2026: A show at the Hollywood Bowl with My Chemical Romance, marking their first show together in over 20 years, as well as a symphonic show at the Sydney Opera House.

In August 2026, The Used announced they were recording a new album in Philadelphia being produced by Will Yip to be released in 2027.

== Musical style and influences ==
The Used's sound has been described as a blend of "feral rage" and "unabashed vulnerability", and has been classified as post-hardcore, emo, pop-punk, screamo, alternative rock, pop screamo, punk rock, hard rock, and heavy metal. In regards to the classification of the band's style, Alternative Press wrote: "We’re 99.9% sure the Used aren’t emo, we’re not quite sure what they are because they’re too dark to be, say, pop punk. Like so many of the most interesting bands, they don’t easily fit in anywhere."

The band's early influences included Grade, Texas is the Reason, Sunny Day Real Estate, the Casket Lottery, At the Drive-In, Glassjaw, Deftones, Ink & Dagger, Jawbox, Fugazi, Nirvana, Refused, Strife, One King Down, Rage Against the Machine, Pearl Jam, Sepultura, Earth Crisis, Snapcase, Blind Melon, Jimmy Eat World, Hot Water Music, Converge, and Goldfinger. In 2007, bassist Jeph Howard stated, "We just don't consider ourselves 'emo' or 'screamo' and we never have. We're a rock band, that's all we've ever been." However, in a 2023 interview, McCracken admitted, "I used to cringe about that term ‘emo’ but I think we’ve swallowed it… We are emo."

For Artwork, McCracken described their genre as "gross pop". On their fifth album, Vulnerable, McCracken stated that there is a lot of hip hop influence, beats and drum and bass kind of stuff but it is also still the Used record with many soft and heavy, brutal, sharp, bright sounds and the tempos are anywhere from ultra-slow to super fast and heavy.

== Members ==
Current

- Bert McCracken – lead vocals, piano, occasional guitar (2000–present)
- Jepha Howard – bass, backing vocals (2000–present)
- Dan Whitesides – drums, percussion, programming, backing vocals (2006–present)
- Joey Bradford – guitars, backing vocals (2018–present)

Former

- Quinn Allman – guitars, backing vocals (2000–2015)
- Branden Steineckert – drums, percussion, programming, backing vocals (2000–2006)
- Justin Shekoski – guitars, piano, organ, programming, backing vocals (2015–2018)

Touring musicians

- Greg Bester – guitars, backing vocals (2002)

== Discography ==
Studio albums

- The Used (2002)
- In Love and Death (2004)
- Lies for the Liars (2007)
- Shallow Believer (2008)
- Artwork (2009)
- Vulnerable (2012)
- The Ocean of the Sky (2013)
- Imaginary Enemy (2014)
- The Canyon (2017)
- Heartwork (2020)
- Heartwork (2021)
- Toxic Positivity (2023)
- Medz (2024)
- To The Grave (2027)
