= Quinn Allman =

American guitarist (born 1982)

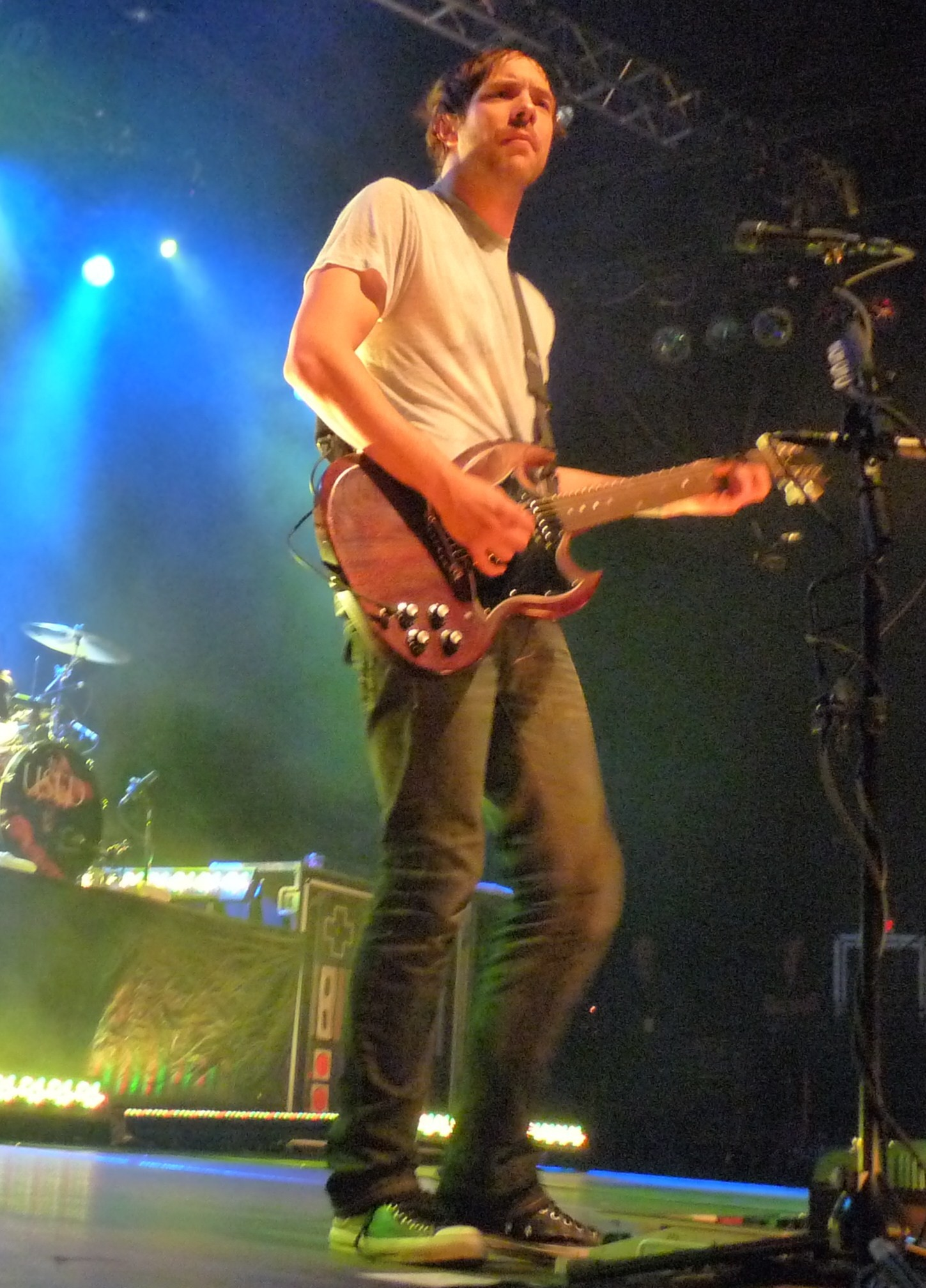
- Quinn Allman in 2009

Background information
- Born: Quinn Scott Allman; January 18, 1982 (age 44); Orem, Utah, U.S.
- Genres: Alternative rock; post-hardcore; emo; pop punk; punk rock
- Occupations: Musician; producer; songwriter; mixing engineer
- Instruments: Guitar; vocals; programming
- Member of: VadaWave; Bloody Cabaret
- Formerly of: The Used; Dumb Luck

Quinn Scott Allman (born January 18, 1982) is an American musician, best known as the guitarist, backing vocalist, and founding member of the rock band The Used.

== Biography ==
Allman grew up in Springville, Utah, and later moved to Pleasant Grove, Utah. He has an older sister and two younger brothers. He grew up watching his father play in numerous bands as a drummer, originally picking up the drums at age five. Allman picked up the guitar at age 14 and started playing in bands at 15. Allman is influenced by bands such as Face to Face, Goldfinger, Thursday, Kenna, Weezer, Jimmy Eat World and The New Transit Direction.

== Career ==
In 1999, Allman formed the band Dumb Luck with Jeph Howard, Branden Steineckert, and Ashton Johnson. They released one EP in 2000 titled The Naked Truth. Later in 2000, Allman formed The Used with Jeph Howard and Branden Steineckert, vocalist Bert McCracken joined in January 2001.

Allman went on to release six studio albums, two EPs, and multiple live compilation albums with The Used, contributing as a lead guitarist, writer, creative director, and background vocalist. Additionally, he played a key role in creating four album documentaries for the band.

On February 2, 2015, The Used announced that Allman would be taking a year long hiatus from the band. Justin Shekoski of Saosin temporarily replaced Allman on subsequent tours. However, on November 19, 2015, The Used released a statement saying that they were moving forward without Allman as a "result of a mutual understanding". However, former bandmate Branden Steineckert, who had left the band nine years prior, hosted Allman on the final episode of his podcast 801PUNX. In the podcast, Allman explains he was actually not allowed to return to the band and was kicked out.

In 2017, Allman sued McCracken, Howard, and The Used LLC for touring, album, and merchandise proceeds that occurred before his dismissal from the band, as well as damages for late and irregular royalty payments due to him. The case was settled out of court in 2020.

Following his departure from The Used, Allman collaborated with many artists such as Mikey Way, Andy Biersack, Patrick Stump, Anthony Green, and John Feldmann.

In 2016, Allman formed his collaborative electronic indie project VadaWave with his wife, Megan Joy. Together they have released one EP, six singles, and five acoustic recordings. They frequently perform and have performed at large music festivals such as LOVELOUD.

Allman had performed as the guitarist with the alternative music project Bloody Cabaret.

In June 2024, Allman posted a message via Instagram saying that he had been subject to years of abuse by someone involved in his musical career, although his alleged abuser was not named.

On August 19, 2024, Allman released "I Digress," the first single from his EP of the same name, in which he performs vocals and guitar, as well as writes the lyrics. "Porcelain", the second single from the EP, was released on October 21, 2024.

On October 9, 2024, Allman announced on his Instagram that his biography, "A Book Full of Sharp Objects," will be released at the end of 2024 following a Kickstarter campaign.

== Personal life ==
Allman married American Idol singer Megan Joy in 2011. Together they have two sons: one from Megan's previous marriage and one born in 2016.

The Used's singer, Bert McCracken, describes Allman as a "truly spiritual and warm" individual. Even following their fallout, McCracken still states that, "No one plays guitar like Quinn".

== Discography ==
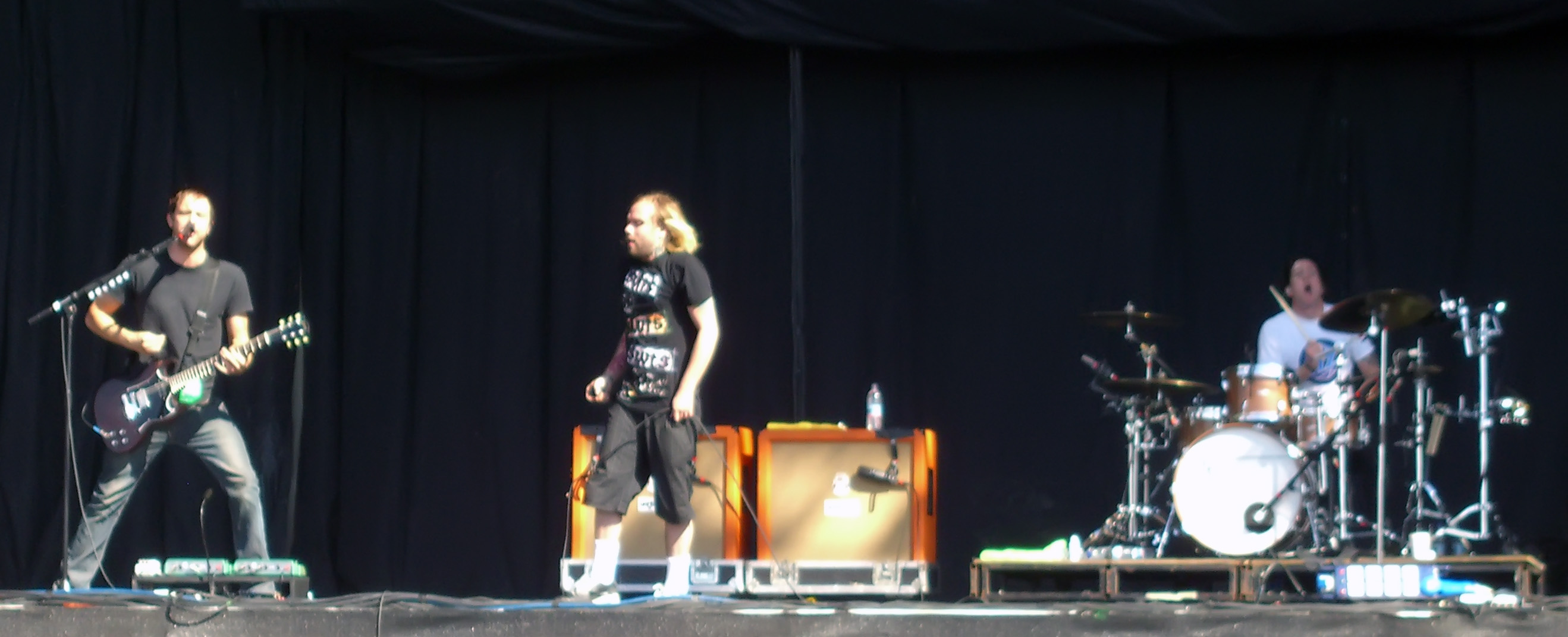
Quinn Allman (far left) performing with The Used at Reading Festival in 2007.

=== EPs ===
List of EPs, showing year released and artist name
EP	Year	Artist
Naked Truth	2000	Dumb Luck
Out of Body	2016	VadaWave
Uglyswtr	2019	Quinn Allman & Branden Steineckert
Bloody Cabaret	2021	Bloody Cabaret

=== Singles ===
Single	Year	Note(s)
I Digress	2024	First single from EP
Porcelain	2024	Second single from EP

=== Other appearances ===
Title	Year	Artist	Note(s)
Disconnection Notice	2005	Goldfinger	Additional Personnel, Guitar
Postpartum Modesty: A Portrait of Skin	2006	Evaline	Audio Production
Avalon	2008	Anthony Green	Guitar
Dear Child (I've Been Dying to Reach You)	2008	Anthony Green	Guitar
The Shadow Side	2016	Andy Black	Guitar, Keyboards, Composer
For Love (Acoustic)	2019	VadaWave	
Out of Body (Acoustic)	2019	VadaWave	
Envy (Acoustic)	2019	VadaWave	
Very Best Part (Acoustic)	2019	VadaWave	
Escape (Acoustic)	2019	VadaWave	
Sink	2019	VadaWave	
Stay	2019	VadaWave	
I'm Dead	2019	VadaWave	
My Moon	2019	VadaWave	
Cry	2019	VadaWave	
Island in the Sun	2021	VadaWave	

== Filmography ==
=== Film ===
Year	Title	Role	Notes
2003	Maybe Memories	Himself	Documentary film
2004	Punk Rock Holocaust	Himself	Documentary film
2005	Taste of Chaos	Himself	Documentary film
2006	My Chemical Romance: Life on the Murder Scene	Himself	Documentary film
2007	Punk's Not Dead	Himself	Documentary film
2007	Berth	Himself	Documentary film
2007	The Making of Lies for the Liars	Himself	Documentary film
2009	Artwork	Himself	Documentary film
2015	Breakdowns	Guitar Player	Film
2015	Rain Clouds		Short
