= Bert McCracken =

American singer (born 1982)

- McCracken in 2014

Background information
- Born: Robert Edward McCracken; February 25, 1982 (age 44); Provo, Utah, U.S.
- Genres: Emo; screamo; post-hardcore; hardcore punk; punk rock; alternative rock; pop-punk
- Occupations: Singer; songwriter
- Member of: The Used
- Spouse: Alison Schneider (m. 2008)

Robert Edward McCracken (born February 25, 1982) is an American singer. He is the lead vocalist and songwriter of the rock band the Used.

== Early life ==
McCracken was born in Provo, Utah, and grew up in Orem, Utah. He was raised in a Mormon family with three sisters (Katie, Melanie, Rachel) and one younger brother (Joseph Taylor). McCracken has stated that he read quite voraciously growing up, due to the influence of his mother, who was a schoolteacher. At age 12, he started playing the trumpet in a local band called "I'm With Stupid". He attended Timpanogos High School for a brief time, before dropping out at 16.

Eldest son of the household, Bert enjoyed a happy home life as a child, but as he grew into a teenager his and his parents' views conflicted. He rebelled against his parents and against their Mormon religion, eventually leaving The Church of Jesus Christ of Latter-day Saints. He dropped out of high school; soon after, he left his home at the age of 16. For some time he was homeless until he found enough money for an apartment, moving in with then-girlfriend Kate.

== Career ==
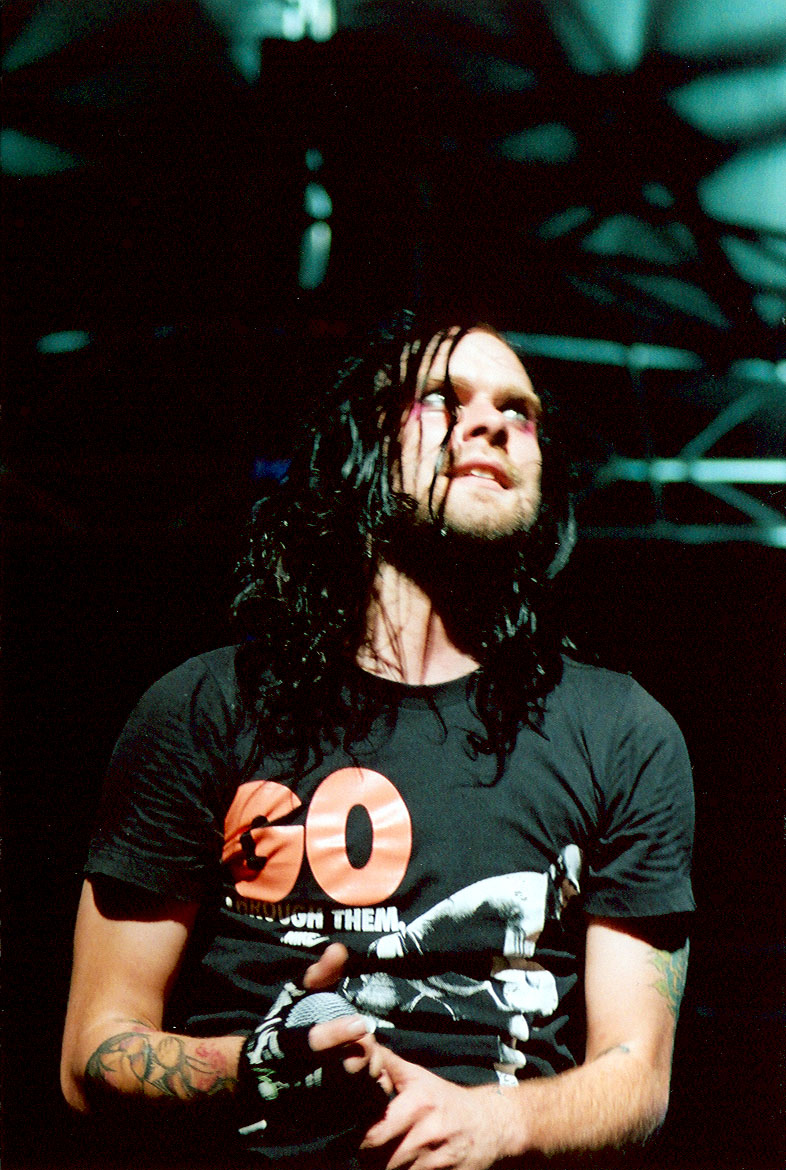
McCracken with The Used in 2005

Prior to joining The Used, McCracken was the vocalist in a straight edge band called Cobra Kai, which he was kicked out of after beginning to smoke marijuana.

In January 2001, when the band called Dumb Luck (which later became The Used, then consisting of Quinn Allman, Jeph Howard, and Branden Steineckert) were looking for a singer, Allman remembered McCracken and he was invited to try out. After being given music that the band had written without words, McCracken wrote the lyrics to what would become "Maybe Memories" and returned the next day with a newly recorded version of the song. The band welcomed him immediately, and renamed themselves "Used". They were eventually discovered by John Feldmann and signed to Reprise Records; they became "The Used" when it was discovered that a Boston band had already trademarked the name "Used". On June 25, 2002, they released their self-titled debut album. It was certified Gold by the Recording Industry Association of America on July 21, 2003. Seventeen years after its debut, it was certified Platinum on September 28, 2019.

On September 28, 2004, The Used released their second album, In Love and Death, under Reprise Records. Within the first week of its release, it sold 93,240 copies and charted at number six on the Billboard 200. By March 2005, the album was certified Gold by the RIAA. On February 28, 2019, it was certified Platinum; fifteen years after its debut.

In 2017, Allman sued McCracken for touring, album, and merchandise proceeds that occurred before his dismissal from the band, as well as damages for late and irregular royalty payments due to him. The case was settled out of court in 2020.

In early 2024, McCracken announced that he would be releasing a solo album under the name “robbietheused”. His debut single, "Just A Little Bit", was released on May 31, 2024.

== Personal life ==
McCracken appeared on the MTV show The Osbournes while he was dating Kelly Osbourne, to her mother's dismay and disapproval.

In 2004, McCracken's then-pregnant ex-girlfriend Kate died of a drug overdose, as the recording of The Used's second album In Love and Death was coming to a close.

In July 2008, McCracken married his Australian fiancée, Alison Schneider, at a private ceremony in Los Angeles. In July 2013, he announced that he and his wife had relocated from Los Angeles to Sydney, Australia, where their first daughter, Cleopatra Rose, was born in January, 2014. Their second child, Minerva Bloom, was born on March 23, 2018.

McCracken has struggled with drug addiction and alcoholism in the past, the former referenced in the song "Bulimic" on The Used's self-titled album. However, he has since overcome his addictions, being sober since 2012.

McCracken has voiced his support for Palestine and left-wing politics alongside being critical of aspects of contemporary American culture and society, such as the influence of larger corporations on the music industry, which partly prompted his move to Australia in 2013. His political views were also influential in the lyrical content of The Used's 2014 album Imaginary Enemy.

About a year prior to the recording of The Used's 2017 album The Canyon, McCracken's friend Tregen died via suicide which heavily influenced the album's lyrical content.

== Discography ==
With The Used

=== Singles ===
List of singles, showing year released and album name
Single	Year	Album
"Happy Christmas (War Is Over)" (Street Drum Corps featuring Bert McCracken)	2005	Taste of Christmas
"Vampire's Diet" (with 3OH!3)	2021	NEED

=== Other appearances ===
Title	Year	Artist	Album	Note(s)
"Spokesman"	2002	Goldfinger	Open Your Eyes	Additional vocals
"Open Your Eyes"	2002	Goldfinger	Open Your Eyes	Additional vocals
"Woodchuck"	2002	Goldfinger	Open Your Eyes	Additional vocals
"Anthem of Our Dying Day"	2003	Story of the Year	Page Avenue	Additional vocals
"You Know What They Do to Guys Like Us in Prison"	2004	My Chemical Romance	Three Cheers for Sweet Revenge	Additional vocals
"Ocean Size"	2005	Goldfinger	Disconnection Notice	Additional vocals
"At Least I'm Good at Something"	2006	The Distance	The Rise and Fall and Everything in Between	Guest
"Handjobs for Jesus"	2008	Goldfinger	Hello Destiny...	Guest vocals
"Days Are Numbered"	2013	Black Veil Brides	Wretched and Divine: The Story of the Wild Ones	Additional vocals
"Body Bag"	2020	Machine Gun Kelly	Tickets to My Downfall	Featured, Writer
"Over My Head"	2020	Girlfriends	Girlfriends	Featured
"Think About Me"	2021	Jxdn	Tell Me About Tomorrow	Writer
"Give Your Heart a Break" (Rock Version)	2023	Demi Lovato	Revamped	Featured
"Dearly Departed"	2024	Escape the Fate	Out of the Shadows 2.0	Featured, Writer
"You're So Ugly When You Cry"	2024	The Funeral Portrait	Greetings from Suffocate City	Featured
"Poison"	2026	Coldrain	Optimize = Optdemise	Featured, Lyricist

== Filmography ==
=== Film ===
Year	Title	Role	Notes
2004	Punk Rock Holocaust	Himself	
2006	My Chemical Romance: Life On The Murder Scene	Himself	Documentary film
2007	Punk's Not Dead	Himself	Documentary film
2013	Black Veil Brides in the Studio: The Making of Wretched & Divine	Himself	Documentary film

=== Television ===
Year	Title	Role	Notes
2002–03	The Osbournes	Himself	2 episodes
