= Alex Pardee =

American artist

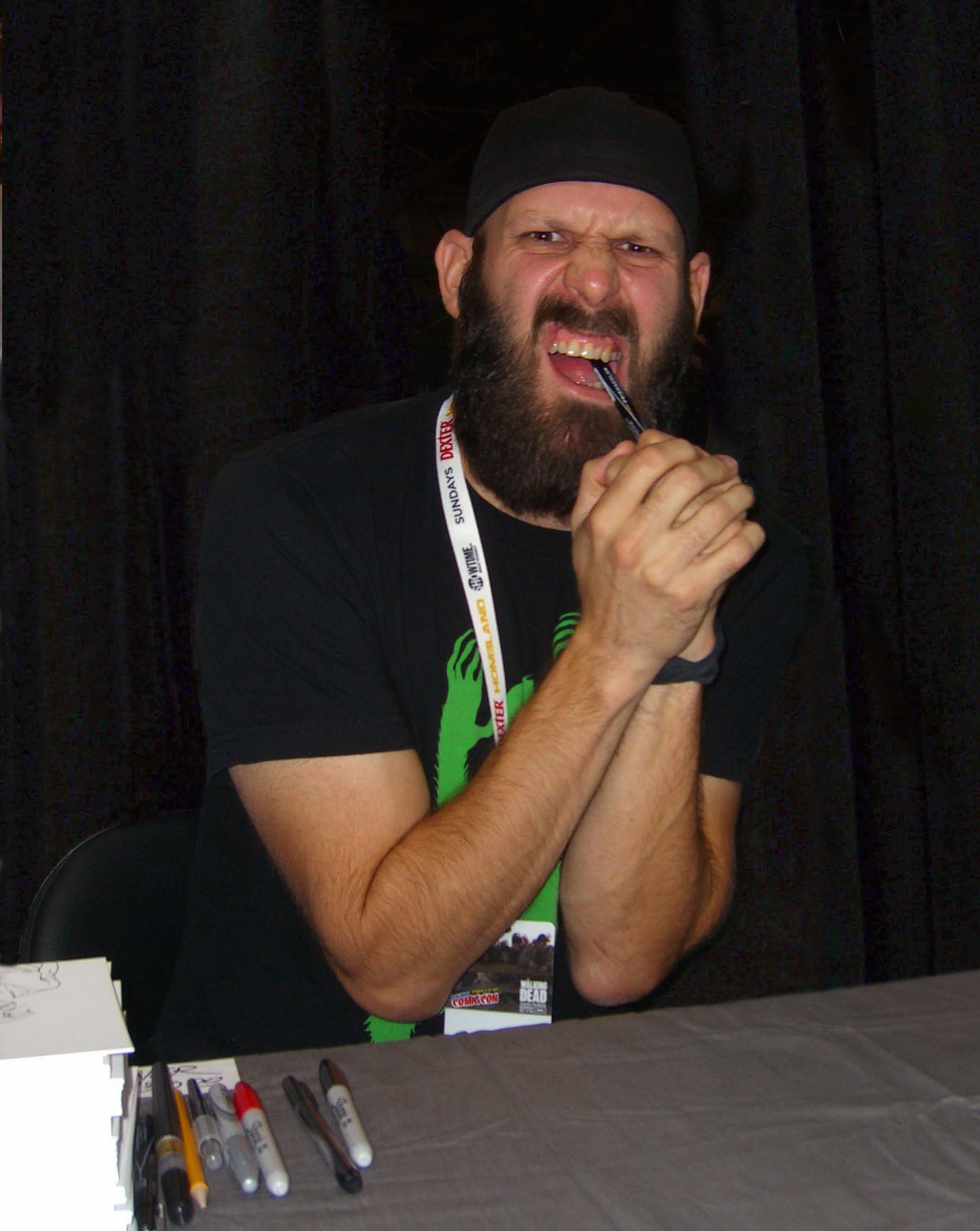
- Pardee at the 2012 New York Comic Con.
- Born: 5 February 1976 (age 50); Antioch, California
- Occupations: Freelance artist, apparel designer, comics creator

Alex Pardee is an American freelance artist, apparel designer, and comics creator writer, best known for illustrating the Used's album artwork.

== Career ==
He has also done works for Hurley International, Twenty Twenty Skateboards, Bay Area rapper TopR, Upper Playground, Street Drum Corps, Aiden, Kid Robot, and lately the cover of In Flames's ninth studio album, A Sense of Purpose, and its first single, "The Mirror's Truth". He is a member of the groups Cardboard City and Zerofriends. He runs the website EyeSuck Ink which includes links to his blog and store. Through his art he has admitted to overcoming depression and anxiety disorders along with emotional struggles. He uses pens, ink, watercolors, and dye, and is trying to use more acrylics, oils, and latex. Pardee is currently working on a motion picture for Chadam (often confused with Chadam Mihlberger) as well as various art shows and products. Pardee released his first official art book, titled Awful Homesick in October 2008.

He designed the artwork for Zack Snyder's movie Sucker Punch. 2014 worked as Art Director, Executive Producer and Creature Designer for Adam Green's Biography creature films Digging Up The Marrow.

In 2015 Pardee collaborated on "I Got Your Back" with hip hop artist Justin Bua who described Pardee as "a prolific artist whose imagination is populated with wicked, warped, and wacky characters that walk a tightrope between playful and grotesque. His artistic world inspires all artists to not only strive for greatness, but more importantly, to have fun."

== Published works ==
=== Albums, singles and musical releases ===
- Aesop Rock
  - The Impossible Kid
- Aiden
  - Conviction
- In Flames
  - "The Mirror's Truth"
  - A Sense of Purpose
- Street Drum Corps
  - Street Drum Corps
  - We Are Machines
- TopR
  - Cheap laughs for dead comedians
  - Marathon of shame
- The Used
  - "Take It Away"
  - In Love and Death
  - "All That I've Got"
  - "I Caught Fire"
  - Berth
  - "The Bird and the Worm"
  - "Liar Liar (Burn in Hell)"
  - Lies for the Liars
  - "Pretty Handsome Awkward"
  - Shallow Believer
- Cage Kennylz
  - Hell's Winter (Tour DVD)
  - I Never Knew You EP
  - Depart from Me

=== Music videos ===
- All That I've Got
- LiveLavaLive (Mitchell Davis)
- WWE Theme Song
- Dredg - The Thought of Losing You (producer)

=== Comics ===
- And So He Bathed in the Blood of the Lepers
- Bunnywith
- My Book of Poetry
- My Book of Feelings
- The Ugliest Fairy (2006)
- Good Night Lava (2007 Upper Playground limited edition)
- Awful Homesick (2008)
- Into the Marrow (2009 1988 Gallery Limited edition)
- The Secrets of Hollywood (2004)

=== Calendars ===
- Astrology Is Dead (2002)
- The Beautiful People Calendar (2003)
- Snoring Blood Calendar (2004)

=== Web series ===
- Chadam (2010)
