= Berth (album) =

Live album by the Used
- Released: February 6, 2007
- Recorded: September 25, 2005
- Venue: PNE Forum in Vancouver, Canada
- Genre: Emo; post-hardcore
- Length: 36:49
- Label: Reprise
- Director: Nick Lambrou
- Producer: John Oakes; John Reese

The Used chronology
| In Love and Death (2004) | Berth (2007) | Lies for the Liars (2007) |

Professional ratings
Review scores
| Source | Rating |
|---|---|
| AllMusic | 2.5/5 stars |
| Drowned in Sound | 5/10 stars |
| Kerrang! | 4/5 stars |
| Metal Hammer | 7/10 stars |

Berth is a live CD/DVD by American rock band the Used that was released on February 6, 2007. It has since been certified gold.

== DVD information ==
Along with the Vancouver concert from the 2005 Taste of Chaos tour, the DVD updates the band's history since 2003's Maybe Memories with footage about 2004's In Love and Death, the world tour, and the making of the new album Lies for the Liars as well as music videos. In addition, the band invited fans to submit questions and then videotaped those selected. It also gave a preview of "Pretty Handsome Awkward".

Berth
| No. | Title | Length |
|---|---|---|
| 1. | "Intro" | 2:21 |
| 2. | "Quinn" | 4:09 |
| 3. | "Bert" | 4:41 |
| 4. | "Jepha" | 4:38 |
| 5. | "Recording In Love and Death" | 3:20 |
| 6. | "Projekt Revolution" | 2:36 |
| 7. | "Japan" | 5:42 |
| 8. | "In the Berth" | 4:55 |
| 9. | "Beginning of the Used Record #3" | 5:12 |
| Total length: | | 37:35 |

Rock
| No. | Title | Length |
|---|---|---|
| 1. | "Intro" | 2:51 |
| 2. | "Take It Away" | 4:36 |
| 3. | "Listening" | 5:45 |
| 4. | "I Caught Fire" | 5:28 |
| 5. | "The Taste of Ink" | 6:25 |
| 6. | "All That I've Got" | 6:08 |
| 7. | "Blue and Yellow" | 6:02 |
| 8. | "A Box Full of Sharp Objects" | 5:46 |
| 9. | "On My Own" | 7:53 |
| 10. | "I'm a Fake" | 7:28 |
| 11. | "Hard to Say" | 4:07 |
| 12. | "Maybe Memories" | 5:14 |
| Total length: | | 1:07:44 |

Junk
| No. | Title | Length |
|---|---|---|
| 1. | "Take It Away" (video) | 3:17 |
| 2. | "All That I've Got" (video) | 4:20 |
| 3. | "I Caught Fire" (video) | 3:25 |
| 4. | "Questions and Answers" | 29:14 |
| Total length: | | 11:03 |

== Delay ==
The Used were supposed to release a live album in early 2006, but one of the people in charge of filming mysteriously disappeared with much of the footage that was earmarked to be part of the DVD. The band was forced to come up with more footage, but in the long run Jeph Howard said it all turned out for the best. "I’m glad we waited. It's better than our first DVD", Howard said. "Everything has been going like that lately. It's been more than good."

== CD listing ==
All tracks are written by the Used.

| No. | Title | Length |
|---|---|---|
| 1. | "Take It Away" | 4:33 |
| 2. | "Listening" | 4:09 |
| 3. | "I Caught Fire" | 3:26 |
| 4. | "Taste of Ink" | 3:54 |
| 5. | "All That I've Got" | 4:02 |
| 6. | "Blue and Yellow" | 3:27 |
| 7. | "I'm a Fake" | 4:52 |
| 8. | "Hard to Say" | 4:17 |
| 9. | "Maybe Memories" | 4:14 |
| Total length: | | 36:49 |

== Personnel ==
Visuals and imagery

- Alex Pardee – creative direction, design

Technical and production

- Nick Lambrou – director
- David May – production
- Raena Winscott – associate producer
- Sean Akhavan – project coordinator
- Seann Cowling – project coordinator
- Ashley Nichols – project coordinator
- Allan Hessler – post audio mixing, engineering
- Steve Evetts – post audio mixing, engineering
- Scott Levitin – masterering

Managerial

- Craig Aaronson – executive producer, A&R
- John Reese – executive producer
- John Oakes – executive producer
- Tim Carhart – A&R coordinator

Technical and production – Berth

- Nick Lambrou – director, editor, camera operator
- Brett Gardali – editor
- Mark Fiore – assistant editor
- Andrew Kopjak – assistant editor
- CW Mihlberger – assistant editor, camera operator
- Sai Siuanesan – camera operator
- Sim Kulgerman – camera operator
- Chris Marrs Piliero – camera operator
- Quinn Allman – camera operator
- Chris Wilson – camera operator
- Brian Berkowitz – camera operator
- Hilary Stewart – camera operator
- Jose – camera operator
- Milke Piliero – camera operator
- Rob Cammidge – camera operator
- Joshua Torrance – boom operator
- Brad Fotsch – audio subbing
- Allan Hessler – post audio mixing, engineer
- Steve Evetts – post audio mixing, engineer
- Scott Levitin – masterering
- Alex Pardee – menu graphics
- Sean Donnelly – menu graphics, DVD menus

Technical and production – Rock

- Nick Lambrou – director, editor
- John Oakes – producer
- Allan Hessler – post audio mixing, engineering
- Steve Evetts – post audio mixing, engineering
- Scott Levitin – masterering
- Jiri Bakala – associate producer
- Vern Giammartino – live producer
- Ed Hatton – live producer
- Shawn Talbot – director of photography
- Mark Fiore – camera operator
- Barry Kaiser – camera operator
- Scooter Corkle – camera operator
- Neal Vigar – camera operator
- Ryan Brown – camera operator
- Nathan Holley – camera operator
- Chris Anaka – camera operator
- Lee Johnson – camera assistant
- Dale Bredeson – camera assistant
- Blair Dykes – camera assistant
- John A. Woods – camera assistant
- Dan Rocque – camera assistant
- Miguel Gelinas – key grip
- Adrian R. Netto – dolly grip
- Shane Johnson – rigging grip
- Devan Thiessen – grip
- Brian Brook – crane operator
- Rob Graham – video technician
- Dana Atwood – production assistant
- Michael Baarda – production assistant

Technical and production – Junk

- Motion Theory – director of "Take It Away"
- Scott Ludden – producer of "Take It Away"
- Marc Webb – director of "All That I've Got"
- Hagai Shaham – producer of "All That I've Got"
- Kevin Kerslake – director of "I Caught Fire"
- Keeley Gould – producer of "I Caught Fire"
- CW Mihlberger – filming, editor of "Questions and Answers"

== Charts ==
Chart performance for Berth (album)
| Chart (2007) | Peak position |
|---|---|
| Australian Albums (ARIA) | 39 |
| Canadian Albums (Nielsen SoundScan) | 29 |
| UK Albums (OCC) | 177 |
| UK Rock & Metal Albums (OCC) | 7 |
| US Billboard 200 | 71 |
| US Top Rock Albums (Billboard) | 16 |

Chart performance for Berth (video)
| Chart (2007) | Peak position |
|---|---|
| US Music Video Sales (Billboard) | 13 |

== Certifications ==
Certifications for Berth
| Region | Certification | Certified units/sales |
|---|---|---|
| United States (RIAA) video | Gold | 50,000^{^} |
^{^} Shipments figures based on certification alone.

== Release history ==
| Region | Date | Label | Format | Catalogue |
|---|---|---|---|---|
| United Kingdom | February 5, 2007 | Reprise | CD+DVD | 9362–49967–2 |
| United States | February 6, 2007 | Reprise | CD+DVD | 49967–2 |
| Australia | February 10, 2007 | Reprise | CD+DVD | 9362499672 |
