= Lies for the Liars =

Studio album by the Used
- Released: May 22, 2007
- Studios: Foxy Studios, Los Angeles, California
- Genres: Post-hardcore; emo; pop-punk; screamo; alternative rock
- Length: 39:41
- Labels: Reprise; Warner Bros.
- Producer: John Feldmann

The Used chronology
In Love and Death (2004)	Lies for the Liars (2007)	Artwork (2009)

Singles from Lies for the Liars
- 1. "The Bird and the Worm" Released: April 3, 2007; 2. "Pretty Handsome Awkward" Released: August 21, 2007

Lies for the Liars is the third studio album by American rock band the Used. It was released on May 22, 2007, and was certified gold by the RIAA on February 28, 2019.

== Background ==
On September 12, 2006, it was announced that drummer Branden Steineckert left the band. However, a day later, Steineckert explained that he was in fact kicked out of the band: "Quinn, Bert and Jeph have agreed that they no longer want to play music with me." In addition, they added that recording was nearly done. However, the band was still working on the album two months later.

In total, the band recorded 19 songs, from about 40 that were written in preparation for the album. Dean Butterworth of Good Charlotte recorded the drums for the album.

== Release ==
On January 17, 2007, Dan Whitesides, formerly of New Transit Direction, was announced as Steineckert's replacement. From mid February to early April 2007, the band co-headlined the 2007 edition of the Taste of Chaos tour. On February 24, Lies for the Liars was announced for release in May. "The Bird and the Worm" was made available for streaming on March 19 through AOL Music, and released to radio on April 3. In April, the band performed in the UK as part of the Give it a Name festival. A music video for "The Bird and the Worm" was released on April 26. A behind-the-scenes video of the music video was released on May 11. Lies for the Liars was made available for streaming on May 18 through their Myspace account, and released four days later through Reprise. The special edition version includes a bonus DVD, slightly different artwork, special casing, and a 24-page booklet packed with vibrant images of the band and Chadam. The special casing is fashioned to look like a book, with the pages within holding several photographs of the band and different fictional characters as well as the lyrics. The DVD has a 20-minute feature on the making of the album.

The group were initially planned to appear on the Warped Tour from late June to early July. However, shortly prior to the beginning of the tour, it was announced that McCracken would be having vocal surgery, which forced the band to abandon the tour. A music video was released for "Pretty Handsome Awkward" on July 23, 2007. The song was released to US alternative radio on August 21 and released to UK radio on September 3. From mid August to early October, the band went a tour of the US with the Bled, Army of Me and the Josephine Collective, which included an appearance at the X96 Big Ass Show radio festival. In between this, the group performed on the main stage at Reading and Leeds Festivals in the UK. Following the tour, the group went visited Australia and New Zealand on the Taste of Chaos Down Under tour. Further tours of Japan and Europe were undertaken in November. A demo version of "Smother Me" was posted on the group's Myspace on November 29, 2007. A few outtakes from the recording sessions, namely "Dark Days", "Slit Your Own Throat", "Devil Beside You", "My Pesticide", "Sun Comes Up", "Sick Hearts" and "Tunnel", were released on the Shallow Believer EP in February 2008.

== Reception ==
Professional ratings
Aggregate scores
Source	Rating
Metacritic	(58/100)
Review scores
Source	Rating
AbsolutePunk	(62%)
AllMusic	3/5 stars
Alternative Press	4/5 stars
Blender	3/5 stars
Entertainment Weekly	B
Hot Press	(3/5)
IGN	(7.7/10)
The New York Times	(average)
NME	(4/10)
Now	1/5 stars
Spin	(6/10)
Stylus Magazine	B−
Twisted Ear	2/5 stars
The Village Voice	(unfavorable)

The album peaked at number 5 on the Billboard 200. It charted at number 39 in the UK and became the group's fastest-selling album in that country.

== Track listing ==
All tracks are written by Quinn Allman, Bert McCracken and Jeph Howard.

No.	Title	Length
1.	"The Ripper"	2:56
2.	"Pretty Handsome Awkward"	3:32
3.	"The Bird and the Worm"	3:45
4.	"Earthquake"	3:29
5.	"Hospital"	2:56
6.	"Paralyzed"	3:13
7.	"With Me Tonight"	3:06
8.	"Wake the Dead"	4:14
9.	"Find a Way"	3:21
10.	"Liar Liar (Burn in Hell)"	2:52
11.	"Smother Me" (with hidden track "Queso")	6:17
Total length:		39:41

=== Additional track information ===
The Used recorded 19 songs during the Lies for the Liars recording session. The 8 B-sides from the session are titled "Dark Days", "Devil Beside You", "Silt Your Own Throat", "My Pesticide", "Sun Comes Up", "Sick Hearts", "Pain" and "Tunnel". The B-sides were released as bonus tracks from select retailers and all later appeared on Shallow Believer except "Pain", "Pain" was only released on Shallow Believer through a download card that was only available during the Lies For The Liars tour. "Tunnel" is the only track that is different between the early bonus track release and Shallow Believer release a year later. A hidden track was also included titled "Queso" which is a 29-second song that is about a quesadilla. Though it was first released on the Used's MySpace in late 2006, most fans talked about it on message boards and thought of it as a joke, it was not expected to actually be on the album. A demo version of "Smother Me" was also posted on the band's MySpace page.

Best Buy bonus tracks
No.	Title	Length
12.	"Dark Days" (later appeared on Shallow Believer)	3:49
13.	"Devil Beside You" (later appeared on Shallow Believer)	3:45

Rhapsody / Circuit City bonus tracks
No.	Title	Length
12.	"My Pesticide" (later appeared on Shallow Believer)	3:07
13.	"On My Own" (Live, same track from Maybe Memories)	2:26

F.Y.E. bonus track
No.	Title	Length
12.	"Slit Your Own Throat" (later appeared on Shallow Believer)	3:04

Target bonus tracks
No.	Title	Length
12.	"Tunnel" (later appeared on Shallow Believer)	3:46
13.	"Maybe Memories" (Live, same track from Berth)	3:11

Japanese bonus track
No.	Title	Length
12.	"Dark Days" (later appeared on Shallow Believer)	3:49
Total length:		43:39

iTunes bonus tracks
No.	Title	Length
12.	"Pain"	4:29
13.	"A Box Full of Sharp Objects" (Live, same track from Maybe Memories; pre-order only)	2:56

Special edition DVD
No.	Title	Length
1.	"The Making of Lies for the Liars"	19:23

== Personnel ==
The Used

- Bert McCracken – lead, backing and gang vocals, piano
- Jeph Howard – bass, backing and gang vocals; animation sequence (DVD)
- Quinn Allman – guitars, backing and gang vocals; animation sequence, filming (DVD)

Additional musicians and production

- Matt Appleton – gang vocals, horns, keyboards, organ, cadence on "Find a Way"; engineering
- Suzie Katayama – string contractor
- John Feldmann – backing and gang vocals, keyboards, programming, percussion, cadence on "Find a Way", string arrangement on "The Bird and the Worm", "Earthquake" and "Smother Me"; production
- Dean Butterworth – drums, percussion, gang vocals
- Arin Older – backing vocals on "The Bird and the Worm", gang vocals
- Ashley Grobmeyer – screams on "Wake the Dead"
- Joe Manganiello – gang vocals
- Danny Feinberg – gang vocals
- Monique Powell – backing vocals on "Smother Me" and "Wake the Dead"
- Julian Feldmann – backing vocals on "Find a Way"
- Chris Lord-Alge – mixing
- Joe Gastwirt – mastering

Design

- Alex Pardee – creative direction, design, photography, creation of "Chadam" and other characters
- MONSTER EFFECTS – creature effects, masks, props, building of Chadam.

Technical

- Jon – drum tech
- Allan Hessler – tech
- Todd Parker – tech

Managerial

- Craig Aaronson – A&R
- Tim Carhart – A&R coordinator

Technical and production – DVD

- CW Mihlberger – director, editor, filming
- Adam Peterson – director, editor, animation sequence, filming
- Chris Trovero – director, editor
- David May – DVD producer
- Raena Winscott – DVD producer
- Tony Friedman – DVD post audio
- Sean Donnelly – DVD menus
- Jim Atkins – DVD authoring
- Sean Cowling – DVD coordination

== Charts ==
Chart performance for Lies for the Liars
Chart (2007)	Peak position
Australian Albums (ARIA)	5
Austrian Albums (Ö3 Austria)	48
Canadian Albums (Billboard)	7
German Albums (Offizielle Top 100)	61
Japanese Albums (Oricon)	33
New Zealand Albums (RMNZ)	38
Scottish Albums (Official Charts)	45
UK Albums (Official Charts)	39
US Billboard 200	5
US Indie Store Album Sales (Billboard)	5
US Top Rock Albums (Billboard)	3

== Certifications ==
Certifications for Lies for the Liars
Region	Certification	Certified units/sales
Canada (Music Canada)	Gold	50,000^{‡}
United States (RIAA)	Gold	500,000^{‡}
^{‡} Sales+streaming figures based on certification alone.

== Release history ==
Standard edition

Region	Date	Label	Format	Catalogue
Australia	May 17, 2007	Reprise	CD	9362433092
United Kingdom	May 21, 2007	Reprise	CD	936-243309-2
United States	May 22, 2007	Reprise	CD	2-43309
Japan	May 23, 2007	Reprise	CD	WPCR-12587
United States	June 5, 2007	Reprise	LP	1-43309

Special edition

Region	Date	Label	Format	Catalogue
United Kingdom	May 21, 2007	Reprise	CD+DVD	9362-43308-2
United States	May 22, 2007	Reprise	CD+DVD	43308-2
