= Under Pressure =

1981 single by Queen and David Bowie

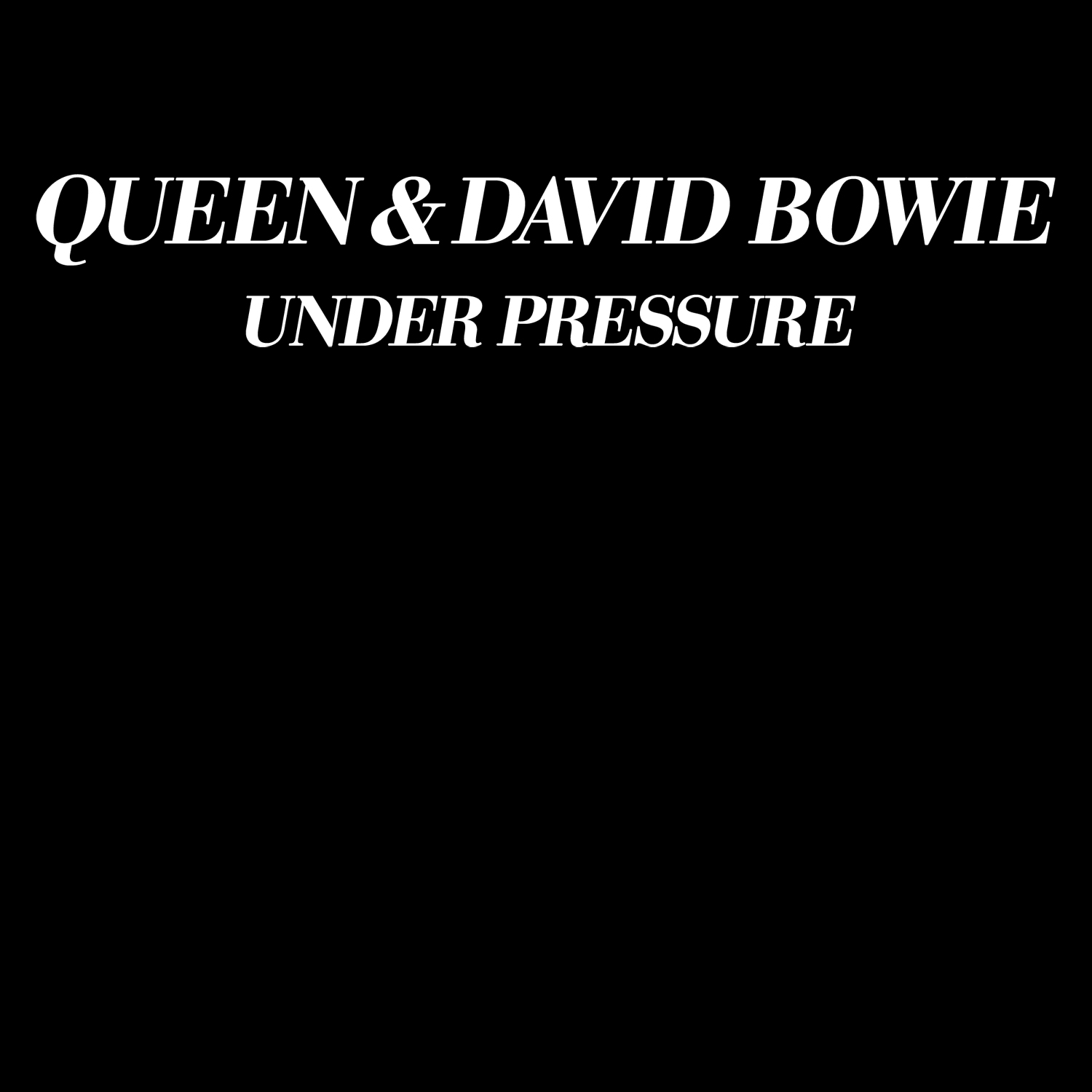
- UK picture sleeve

Single by Queen and David Bowie

from the album Hot Space
- B-side: "Soul Brother"
- Released: 27 October 1981 (US); 2 November 1981 (UK)
- Recorded: September 1981
- Studio: Mountain, Montreux
- Genre: Dance-rock; rock
- Length: 4:08
- Label: EMI; Elektra
- Songwriters: Roger Taylor; Freddie Mercury; David Bowie; John Deacon; Brian May
- Producers: Queen; David Bowie

Queen singles chronology
"Flash" (1980)	"Under Pressure" (1981)	"Body Language" (1982)

David Bowie singles chronology
"Up the Hill Backwards" (1981)	"Under Pressure" (1981)	"Wild Is the Wind" (1981)

Alternative cover
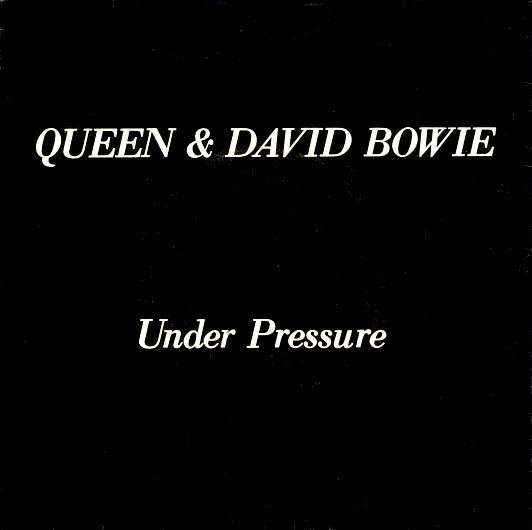
- Artwork for US release

Music video
- "Under Pressure" on YouTube

"Under Pressure" is a song by the British rock band Queen and singer David Bowie. Released as a single in October 1981, it was later included on Queen's tenth studio album Hot Space (1982). The song reached number one on the UK Singles Chart, becoming Queen's second number-one hit in their home country and Bowie's third; it also charted in the top 10 in more than 10 other countries.

The song has been described as a "monster rock track that stood out" on the Hot Space album. "Under Pressure" was listed at number 31 on VH1's 100 Greatest Songs of the '80s, and voted the second-best collaboration of all time in a poll by Rolling Stone. In 2021, it was ranked number 429 on Rolling Stone's list of The 500 Greatest Songs of All Time. It was played live at every Queen concert from 1981 until the end of the band's touring career in 1986. Live recordings appear on Queen live albums, including Queen Rock Montreal and Live at Wembley '86.

The song was included on some editions of Queen's first Greatest Hits compilations, such as the original 1981 Elektra release in North America. It appears on the band's compilation albums Greatest Hits II, Classic Queen, and Absolute Greatest, and on Bowie compilations such as Best of Bowie (2002), The Platinum Collection (2005), The Best of David Bowie 1980/1987 (2007), Nothing Has Changed (2014), Legacy (2016), and Re:Call 3 (2017).

"Under Pressure" was sampled by American rapper Vanilla Ice for his 1990 single "Ice Ice Baby". Vanilla Ice initially did not credit Bowie or Queen, who sued and gained a songwriting credit on Ice's song. "Under Pressure" has been recorded by American rock bands My Chemical Romance and the Used, and singer Shawn Mendes, whose version featured singer Teddy Geiger. Xiu Xiu covered the song, with Swans frontman Michael Gira, for Xiu Xiu's 2008 album Women as Lovers. On the eighth day of the Artemis II's mission back to Earth, the song was played as part of Artemis II's wake up call, which garnered a positive reaction from Queen's guitarist, Brian May.

== Background and composition ==
"Under Pressure" was recorded at Mountain Studios in Montreux, Switzerland, in September 1981. Queen, working on their 1982 album Hot Space, had been working on a song called "Feel Like", but were not satisfied with the result. Although it was said that the collaboration started from Queen running into David Bowie at Mountain while recording "Cat People (Putting Out Fire)", the story told in interviews was that Bowie happened to be around in Montreux and lived near the studio, so Queen invited Bowie down to the studio and it took off from there. The track was recorded during one marathon evening session at Mountain, with vocals and mixing completed at the Power Station in New York a couple of weeks later.

Bowie sang backing vocals for Queen's song "Cool Cat", but his vocals were removed from the final song because he was not satisfied with his performance. Afterwards, they worked together for a while and wrote "Under Pressure". It was credited as being co-written by the five musicians. The scat singing that dominates much of the song is evidence of the jam-beginnings as improvisation. However, according to Queen bassist John Deacon (as quoted in a French magazine in 1984), the song's primary musical songwriter was Freddie Mercury – though all contributed to the arrangement. As Brian May recalled to Mojo magazine in October 2008, "It was hard, because you had four very precocious boys and David, who was precocious enough for all of us. David took over the song lyrically. Looking back, it's a great song, but it should have been mixed differently. Freddie and David had a fierce battle over that. It's a significant song because of David and its lyrical content." The earlier, embryonic version of the song without Bowie, "Feel Like", is widely available in bootleg form, and was written by Queen drummer Roger Taylor.

Also, some confusion has arisen about who had created the song's bassline. John Deacon said (in Japanese magazine Music life in 1982) that David Bowie created it. In more recent interviews, Brian May and Roger Taylor credited the bass riff to Deacon. Bowie, on his website, said the bassline was already written before he became involved. Roger Taylor, in an interview for the BBC documentary Queen: The Days of Our Lives, stated that Deacon did indeed create the bassline, and that all through the sessions in the studio, he had been playing the riff over and over again. He also claims that when the band returned from dinner, Deacon misremembered the riff, but Taylor was still able to remember it. According to Brian May in a 2016 article for Mirror Online, it was actually Bowie, not Taylor, who had inadvertently changed the riff. The riff began as "Deacy began playing, 6 notes the same, then one note a fourth down". After the dinner break, Bowie changed Deacon's memory of the riff to "Ding-Ding-Ding Diddle Ing-Ding".

== Reception ==
"Under Pressure" has received critical acclaim since its release, with multiple publications ranking it among Queen and Bowie's best songs and among the greatest songs of all time. On release, Sandy Robertson of Sounds called "Under Pressure" the "cornerstone" of its parent album. Record World said that "Bowie and Freddie Mercury combine for a spellbinding musical experience." Reviewing Hot Space decades later, Stephen Thomas Erlewine of AllMusic called "Under Pressure" as the album's "undeniable saving grace" and "the only reason most listeners remember this album". He described the song as "an utterly majestic, otherworldly duet ... that recaptures the effortless grace of Queen's mid-'70s peak, but is underscored with a truly affecting melancholy heart that gives it a genuine human warmth unheard in much of their music." Similarly, Ned Raggett of AllMusic described the song as "anthemic, showy, and warm-hearted, [and] a clear standout for both acts".

Following Bowie's death in 2016, Jack Hamilton of Slate called "Under Pressure" a "masterpiece" and is a reminder to the public that Bowie could be "wonderfully, powerfully human."

The September 2005 edition of online music magazine Stylus singled out the bassline as the best in popular music history. In November 2004, Stylus Magazine music critic Anthony Miccio commented that "Under Pressure" "is the best song of all time" and described it as Queen's "opus". In 2012, Slant Magazine listed "Under Pressure" as the 21st best single of the 1980s. It was listed at number 31 on VH1's 100 Greatest Songs of the '80s and voted the second best collaboration of all time in a poll by Rolling Stone magazine. It is ranked number 429 on Rolling Stone's list of The 500 Greatest Songs of All Time.

== Music video ==
The music video for the song features neither Queen nor David Bowie due to touring commitments. Director David Mallet edited together stock footage of traffic jams, commuter trains packed with passengers, explosions, riots, cars being crushed, and various pieces of footage from silent films of the 1920s, most notably Sergei Eisenstein's influential Soviet film Battleship Potemkin, The Eagle, My Lady of Whims, the silent Dr. Jekyll and Mr. Hyde starring John Barrymore, and F.W. Murnau's Nosferatu. Top of the Pops refused to show the video in its original form due to it containing footage of explosions in Northern Ireland, so an edited version was instead shown. In 2003, Slant Magazine ranked "Under Pressure" number 27 among the 100 greatest music videos of all time.

== "Ice Ice Baby" sampling controversy ==
After Vanilla Ice sampled the song's intro bassline and piano chords for his 1990 single "Ice Ice Baby", he did not initially give songwriting credit or pay royalties to Queen and Bowie. When asked to do so, he denied having sampled the song, then he acknowledged the sample but said he had modified it. Bowie and Queen sued and received songwriting credit. Vanilla Ice later claimed that he had purchased the publishing rights to "Under Pressure", saying that buying the song made more financial sense than paying out royalties, but a Queen spokesman said Vanilla Ice's statement was untrue.

== Track listing ==
=== 7": EMI / EMI 5250 (UK) ===
Side one

1. "Under Pressure" (Mercury, May, Taylor, Deacon, Bowie) – 4:08

Side two

1. "Soul Brother" (Mercury) – 3:38

=== 7": Elektra / E-47235 (US) ===
Side one

1. "Under Pressure" (Mercury, May, Taylor, Deacon, Bowie) – 4:08

Side two

1. "Soul Brother" (Mercury) – 3:38

=== 1988 3" CD: Parlophone / QUECD9 (UK) ===
1. "Under Pressure" – 4:08
2. "Soul Brother" – 3:40
3. "Body Language" – 4:33

== Personnel ==
According to Bowie biographer Chris O'Leary and Queenvinyls:

- Freddie Mercury – lead and backing vocals, Hammond organ, piano, handclaps, finger snaps
- Brian May – electric guitar, handclaps, finger snaps
- Roger Taylor – drums, backing vocals, handclaps, finger snaps
- John Deacon – bass guitar, handclaps, finger snaps
- David Bowie – lead and backing vocals, Jupiter-8, handclaps, finger snaps
- David Richards – piano

== Live performances ==
Although very much a joint project, only Queen incorporated the song into their live shows at the time. Roger Taylor sang Bowie's parts, as Bowie was never present for a live performance of the song with him. Bowie chose not to perform the song before an audience until the 1992 Freddie Mercury Tribute Concert, when he and Annie Lennox sang it as a duet (backed by the surviving Queen members). However, after Mercury's death and the Outside tour in 1995, Bowie performed the song at virtually every one of his live shows, with bassist Gail Ann Dorsey taking Mercury's vocal part. The song also appeared in set lists from A Reality Tour mounted by Bowie in 2004, when he frequently would dedicate it to Freddie Mercury. Queen + Paul Rodgers have performed the song. In summer of 2012, Queen + Adam Lambert toured, including a performance of the song by Lambert and Roger Taylor in each show.

== Live recordings ==
- Queen first recorded a live full version of the song at the Montreal Forum in Canada on 25 November 1981. This was included in the concert films We Will Rock You and Queen Rock Montreal. Incidentally, it is one of the few times in concert where Mercury used falsetto in the song on the line "these are the days it never rains but it pours".
- A second live version of the song was recorded at Milton Keynes, England, in 1982. This was released in 2004 on the live album/DVD Queen on Fire - Live at the Bowl. Prior to the concert, rumours circulated that Bowie would appear with Queen to sing his parts on stage, but he probably did not even attend the concert.
- In September 1982, the band performed the song during an appearance on the eighth-season premiere of Saturday Night Live, which turned out to be Freddie Mercury's final live performance with Queen in the United States.
- Later, Queen recorded a third live version of the song at Wembley Stadium, London, in 1986. This was released on the live album/DVD Live at Wembley Stadium. Another rendition from this same tour (from Queen's concert in Budapest) appeared in edited form on the album Live Magic in 1986. A recording taken from Queen's last gig in Knebworth Park in 1986, appears, albeit in remixed form, as a B-side from second CD single of "Rah Mix" version of this song, released in 1999. (See below)
- During the Freddie Mercury Tribute Concert in 1992, the surviving members of Queen along with Bowie and Annie Lennox (fulfilling Mercury's role) performed the song. The concert was later released on DVD in 2002 for the 10th anniversary.
- A version recorded by David Bowie's live band in 1995 was released on the bonus disc included with some versions of Outside – Version 2. This live version was also released on the single "Hallo Spaceboy" in 1996. Two live recordings from the Outside Tour appear on Bowie's live concert albums Ouvre le Chien (Live Dallas 95) (2020) and No Trendy Réchauffé (Live Birmingham 95) (2020).
- Bowie's 25 June 2000 performance of the song at the Glastonbury Festival was released in 2018 on Glastonbury 2000.
- Bowie's DVD A Reality Tour (2004) and album A Reality Tour (2010) include a November 2003 live version from the A Reality Tour, recorded in Dublin, with Bowie's bassist Gail Ann Dorsey singing Mercury's parts.
- The 2006 VH1 Rock Honors at the Mandalay Bay Events Center in Las Vegas, featured Queen + Paul Rodgers performing "Under Pressure" along with "The Show Must Go On", "We Will Rock You" and "We Are the Champions" as a live broadcast.

== Remixes and other releases ==
=== Rah Mix ===
"Under Pressure (Rah Mix)"

Single by Queen and David Bowie

from the album Greatest Hits III
- B-side: "The Song of the Millennium – Bohemian Rhapsody"; "Thank God It's Christmas"
- Released: 6 December 1999
- Genre: Rock, dance rock
- Length: 4:08 (album and single); 4:27 (music video)
- Label: EMI; Parlophone
- Songwriters: Queen; David Bowie
- Producers: Queen; David Bowie

Queen singles chronology
"Another One Bites the Dust (Small Soldiers remix)" (1998)	"Under Pressure (Rah Mix)" (1999)	"We Will Rock You" (2000)

David Bowie singles chronology
"The Pretty Things Are Going to Hell" (1999)	"Under Pressure (Rah Mix)" (1999)	"Survive" (2000)

A remixed version (called the "Rah Mix") was issued in December 1999 to promote Queen's Greatest Hits III compilation, reaching No. 14 on the UK Singles Chart. The video for the Rah Mix was directed by DoRo, featuring footage of Freddie Mercury from Queen's Wembley concert on 12 July 1986 and David Bowie at the Freddie Mercury Tribute Concert also at Wembley Stadium on 20 April 1992 spliced together using digital technology (with Annie Lennox carefully edited out). This version is featured on the Greatest Hits III compilation, the Rah Mix CD single (as an Enhanced CD video) and the 2011 iTunes LP edition of Hot Space.

==== Track listing ====
Two CD singles (one multimedia enhanced) released 6 December 1999 and 7" picture disc released 13 December 1999. As "Bohemian Rhapsody" won The Song of The Millennium award, this was released with Bohemian Rhapsody as B-side

CDS No. 1

1. "Under Pressure" (Rah Mix)
2. The Song of the Millennium – "Bohemian Rhapsody"
3. "Thank God It's Christmas"

CDS No. 2

1. "Under Pressure" (Rah Mix – Radio Edit)
2. "Under Pressure" (Mike Spencer Mix)
3. "Under Pressure" (Knebworth Mix)
4. Enhanced section

7-inch single

1. "Under Pressure" (Rah Mix)
2. The Song of the Millennium – "Bohemian Rhapsody"

=== Other releases ===
- It was initially released in the US on the Elektra Records US and Canadian versions of Queen's Greatest Hits as a new track.
- It was released in the UK on Queen's Greatest Hits II in 1991 (which would later be included in The Platinum Collection (2000, 2002 and 2011) in a version removing the second time David Bowie sings, "This is our last dance."
- It was released as a bonus track on the Virgin Records reissue of Bowie's Let's Dance in 1995.
- Hollywood Records remixed the song for their 1992 release, Classic Queen. This version features improved sound quality but also removes Mercury's interjection "that's okay!" at about 0:53.
- It also appeared on the Bowie compilation Bowie: The Singles 1969-1993 (1993).
- The original single version appears on disc three of Bowie's The Platinum Collection (2005). This disc was later released separately as The Best of David Bowie 1980/1987 (2007).
- The original single version also appears on Bowie's Nothing Has Changed (2014), Legacy (2016), and the Re:Call 3 compilation included in A New Career in a New Town (1977–1982) (2017).
- An instrumental version was performed by the Royal Philharmonic Orchestra on their 1995 album The Queen Collection.

=== Other remixes ===
"Mouth Pressure". Released in January 2017 as a part of the Neil Cicierega album Mouth Moods, "Mouth Pressure" pairs the instrumentals from "Under Pressure" with the vocals from Smash Mouth's "All Star".

"Percy's Pressure". A karaoke version of the song was released in September as a part of the soundtrack of the animated Warner Brothers musical film Smallfoot whose lyrics detail one of the central human characters Percy's (voiced by James Corden) fall from fame and his need to bounce back. Additional lyrics were written by Karey Kirkpatrick, the film's director, and his brother Wayne Kirkpatrick.

== Use in other media ==
A radically remixed version is used in Charlotte Wells' 2022 BAFTA winning film Aftersun. The track appears at the climactic ending of the film in a version which gradually strips away most of the instrumentation leaving Bowie and Mercury’s vocals to be accompanied by electronic drones and cello from composer Oliver Coates.

== Charts ==
In the UK, "Under Pressure" was Queen's second number-one hit and Bowie's third. Queen's smash hit "Bohemian Rhapsody" reached number one in November 1975, just two weeks after Bowie's "Space Oddity" had done the same. Bowie also topped the British charts in August 1980 with "Ashes to Ashes", his answer song to "Space Oddity".

=== Original version ===
==== Weekly charts ====
Weekly chart performance for "Under Pressure"
Chart (1981–1982)	Peak position
Australia (Kent Music Report)	6
Austria (Ö3 Austria Top 40)	10
Belgium (Ultratop 50 Flanders)	5
Belgium (VRT Top 30 Flanders)	5
Canada (CHUM)	1
Canada Top Singles (RPM)	3
Ireland (IRMA)	2
Italy (Musica e dischi)	20
Luxembourg (Radio Luxembourg)	1
Netherlands (Dutch Top 40)	1
Netherlands (Single Top 100)	1
New Zealand (Recorded Music NZ)	6
Norway (VG-lista)	5
Portugal (AFP)	5
South Africa (Springbok Radio)	4
Spain (AFYVE)	9
Sweden (Sverigetopplistan)	10
Switzerland (Schweizer Hitparade)	10
UK Singles (Official Charts)	1
US Billboard Hot 100	29
US Hot Rock Songs	7
US Cash Box Top 100	22
West Germany (GfK)	21

Chart (2009)	Peak position
Ireland (IRMA)	45

Chart (2016)	Peak position
Australia (ARIA)	42
Austria (Ö3 Austria Top 40)	37
Canada (Hot Canadian Digital Songs)	30
Euro Digital Song Sales (Billboard)	17
France (SNEP)	20
Ireland (IRMA)	51
Italy (FIMI)	29
Netherlands (Single Top 100)	66
Portugal (AFP)	39
Spain (Promusicae)	28
Sweden (Sverigetopplistan)	59
Switzerland (Schweizer Hitparade)	49
UK Singles (Official Charts)	43
US Billboard Hot 100	45
US Hot Rock & Alternative Songs (Billboard)	5

===== Year-end charts =====
Chart (1981)	Position
Australia (Kent Music Report)	89
Canada Top Singles (RPM)	73
Netherlands (Dutch Top 40)	60
Netherlands (Single Top 100)	13
UK	43

Chart (1982)	Position
Canada Top Singles (RPM)	41
US (Joel Whitburn's Pop Annual)	170

Chart (2016)	Position
US Hot Rock Songs (Billboard)	62

=== "Rah Mix" ===
==== Weekly charts ====
Chart (1999–2000)	Peak position
Italy Airplay (Music & Media)	3
Netherlands (Dutch Top 40)	19
UK Singles (OCC)	14

==== Year-end charts ====
Chart (1999)	Position
Netherlands (Dutch Top 40)	186

== Certifications ==
Region	Certification	Certified units/sales
Australia (ARIA)	3× Platinum	210,000^{‡}
Brazil (Pro-Música Brasil)	Gold	30,000^{‡}
Denmark (IFPI Danmark)	Platinum	90,000^{‡}
Italy (FIMI)	3× Platinum	300,000^{‡}
New Zealand (RMNZ)	7× Platinum	210,000^{‡}
Spain (Promusicae)	2× Platinum	120,000^{‡}
United Kingdom (BPI)	4× Platinum	2,400,000^{‡}
United States (RIAA)	4× Platinum	4,000,000^{‡}
^{‡} Sales+streaming figures based on certification alone.

== My Chemical Romance and the Used version ==
"Under Pressure"

Single by My Chemical Romance and the Used

from the album In Love and Death
- Released: 12 April 2005
- Genre: Emo
- Length: 3:32
- Label: Reprise
- Songwriters: Roger Taylor; Freddie Mercury; David Bowie; John Deacon; Brian May
- Producer: Howard Benson

My Chemical Romance singles chronology
"Helena" (2005)	"Under Pressure" (2005)	"The Ghost of You" (2005)

The Used singles chronology
"I Caught Fire" (2005)	"Under Pressure" (2005)	"The Bird and the Worm" (2007)

The song was covered in 2005 by American alternative rock bands the Used and My Chemical Romance for tsunami relief. The cover was originally released as an Internet download track but has subsequently been featured as a bonus track on the 2005 re-release of the Used's second studio album In Love and Death, and received wide airplay in 2005.

On the Billboard charts, the single reached number 28 on Modern Rock chart and number 41 on the Hot 100.

Chart (2005)	Peak position
US Billboard Hot 100	41
US Alternative Airplay (Billboard)	28
US Billboard Pop 100	28

== Shawn Mendes version ==
"Under Pressure"

Promotional single by Shawn Mendes featuring Teddy<3
- Released: 11 October 2018
- Length: 3:11
- Label: Virgin EMI
- Songwriters: Roger Taylor; Freddie Mercury; David Bowie; John Deacon; Brian May
- Producer: Teddy Geiger

Shawn Mendes promotional singles chronology
"Don't Be a Fool" (2018)	"Under Pressure" (2018)	"Intro" (2020)

In October 2018, Canadian singer-songwriter Shawn Mendes featuring American singer-songwriter Teddy Geiger (credited as teddy<3) released a version of the song.

The song was released to coincide with the release of the film Bohemian Rhapsody. Universal Music Group released three tracks by different artists "channeling their inner Freddie Mercury"; this was the first installment, released in October 2018 followed by 5 Seconds of Summer's "Killer Queen" cover track.

A portion of the profits from the "Under Pressure" cover was donated to Mercury Phoenix Trust, which was founded by Queen's Brian May and Roger Taylor (and the group's manager, Jim Beach) after Mercury's death to help fight AIDS worldwide. Mendes said in a statement: "I am so honoured to be able to support the amazing legacy of Freddie and Queen by doing a cover of one of my favourite songs, 'Under Pressure'".

=== Reception ===
Taylor Weatherby from Billboard called the track "breezy" and said "Mendes and Geiger put their voices at the forefront of the stripped-down rendition, with Mendes' falsetto and Geiger's 'raspier' tone complementing their plucky acoustic guitars."
