= Chadam =

Animated web series by Alex Pardee

Chadam is an animated web series by artist Alex Pardee based on characters he created for a number of the Used's album artwork and distributed by The WB and Eye Suck Ink. Chadam is produced by Jason "Jace" Hall of HDFILMS Inc. The short series premiered June 15, 2010 on TheWB.com. The WB and its children's network, Kids WB! is closed, but the website is still open. Chadam appeared on the cover of Lies for the Liars. The episodes are nearly 4 to 5 minutes long. iTunes has the episodes in a collection called Chadam, the Complete Series. iTunes episodes are nearly the 13 minute mark because two short episodes are built into one, for example, "Cut from Cardboard" and "Ripley, Believe It or Not" are put together as "The Awakening".

Hall pushed the boundaries of traditional filmmaking by using a computer game engine, Unreal Engine 3, in order to meet the challenge of animating Pardee's surreal work.

== List of episodes ==
- Cut from Cardboard
- Ripley, Believe It or Not
- Repressed Memories
- Under Pressure
- The Unsung and Undeveloped Hero
- Little Orphan Viceroy
- Sometimes The Strong Don't Survive
- The Grave Escape
- No Time to Say Hello, Goodbye
- Dying is a Part of Life
