= The New Transit Direction =

American indie rock band

- Origin: Salt Lake City, Utah, U.S.
- Genre: Indie rock
- Years active: 1999–2006, 2016
- Label: Some
- Members: Josh Asher; Jake Hawley; John Finnegan; Dan Whitesides
- Past members: Levi Lebo; Andrew Carruthers

The New Transit Direction (TNTD) was an indie rock band from Salt Lake City, Utah, formed in 1999.

The group released an EP called New Transit Direction in 2002, which was produced by J. Robbins. Following this the band played Warped Tour 2003 and signed a record deal with Some Records. The frequently played Kilby Court, an all-ages venue in Salt Lake City. Their first album, Wonderful Defense Mechanisms, was produced and mixed by John Congleton and was released in 2004. This album garnered comparisons to Jawbox, Jawbreaker, Quicksand, and The Hives. The band performed as an opening act with The Used, Taking Back Sunday, and The Blood Brothers.

After breaking up in 2006, members of the band formed Still Breaking Hearts, which released an EP in 2007. The drummer, Dan Whitesides, has replaced Brandon Steineckert as the new drummer in The Used. Guitar player and singer Josh Asher, went on to start Epic Electric, an electrical contracting company based out of Salt Lake City, Utah.

In 2016, the band reunited to play Crucialfest in 2016.

== Band members ==
- Josh Asher: guitar, lead vocals
- Jake Hawley: guitar
- Andrew Carruthers: bass (1999–2002)
- Levi Lebo: bass (2002–2004)
- John Finnegan: bass (2004–2006)
- Dan Whitesides: drums

== Discography ==
- New Transit Direction (EP) (2002)
- Lemon EP (2003)
- Wonderful Defense Mechanisms (Some Records; 2004)
