= In Love and Death =

Studio album by the Used
- Released: September 28, 2004
- Recorded: March 2004
- Studios: Foxy Studios, Los Angeles, California
- Genres: Emo; alternative rock; punk rock; post-hardcore; screamo
- Length: 41:43
- Label: Reprise
- Producer: John Feldmann

The Used chronology
| Maybe Memories (2003) | In Love and Death (2004) | Berth (2007) |

Singles from In Love and Death
- 1. "Take It Away" Released: August 23, 2004; 2. "All That I've Got" Released: December 7, 2004; 3. "I Caught Fire" Released: February 12, 2005; 4. "Under Pressure" Released: April 13, 2005

In Love and Death is the second studio album by American rock band the Used. It was released on September 28, 2004, and was later certified platinum in the United States, indicating over 1,000,000 copies shipped. It is their most commercially successful album to date. The title and music reference a number of tragic events that surrounded vocalist Bert McCracken during the album's production, notably the death of his pregnant girlfriend. In Love and Death is the final studio album to feature drummer Branden Steineckert.

== Background ==
The Used released their self-titled debut album in June 2002 through major label Reprise Records. Frequent touring across the United States helped the band build their fan base. Soon afterwards, the band appeared at Warped Tour and Ozzfest, and was included in larger-sized package tours. In an interview with Billboard in February 2003, vocalist Bert McCracken said the group was aiming to record their second album at the end of the year. McCracken added that they planned to write it in the same manner they did for their debut: "We're going to go back to Utah and jam at [drummer] Branden [Steineckert]'s house".

A DVD/CD package, Maybe Memories, followed as a stop-gap release to tide the group's fans over until their next album. The band subsequently spent a few months in Orem, Utah writing material for the next album. McCracken said the group "figured it would be best to be in an environment we were really used to". In January 2004, MTV reported that the group would begin working on their second album within the next month. In February, it was reported that it would be released in June or July. A proposed UK tour with Head Automatica scheduled for February 2004 was cancelled when their frontman had a flair up of Crohn's disease.

== Production ==
In Love and Death was recorded at Foxy Studios in Los Angeles, California with producer John Feldmann in mid-March. Feldmann also acted as an engineer with assistance from Mark Blewett and Alan Hessler. Throughout most of the sessions, the band members argued about the album's direction, and had a confrontation with Feldmann on multiple occasions. Steineckert explained that there was "always some kind of butting-heads going on, whether it was big or little stuff", which "created this underlying tension throughout the record". In addition, two of McCracken's close friends died during the sessions. McCracken said "everything that went into the record — me having lost two friends, tension within the band and tension with our producer — was mostly positive because it all made the songs come together like magic".

One of McCracken's lost friends was his ex-girlfriend Kate, who was pregnant with his child. Prior to her death of a drug overdose, the pair had split up but "decided to keep the baby and try to stay friends and work it out". McCracken said her death "had a huge impact on the way the record turned out". Feldmann and McCracken wrote string arrangements for the album. Sean Ingram of Coalesce contributed additional vocals to "Sound Effects and Overdramatics". Additional programming was done by Danny Lohner, Josh Eustis and Steineckert on "Take It Away". Digital editing was done by Anthony Catalano. Feldmann mixed the recordings, which were then mastered by Joe Gastwirt at Ocean View Digital Mastering.

== Composition and music ==
Loudwire stated that the album "features some of the Used’s most melodic moments." Prior to recording, McCracken claimed there would be "a lot more piano-based songs than guitar-riff rock songs" on the album. He added that they "definitely want to keep it eclectic and mix it all up", incorporating each members different taste in music. He said the album "definitely still [sounds like] the Used" and that the group "went [into] a lot of different places that I never thought we would go for sure". He added that there was "a lot [of] brighter tones and ... dance-y rhythms". The album's vocals have been described as "strained and tortured." The album's sound has been described as emo, punk rock and alternative rock. Additionally, some consider it to be a "scene album".

The album's lyrics explore themes such as acceptance, regret, remorse and self-reflection. Similar to their debut, McCracken said "a lot of the songs are personal but ... written in a way that you're not gonna necessarily know what I'm talking about, but you'll definitely be able to get involved and make it your own". Overall, he said it was "all about loss and love and tragedy and just regular everyday things we all go through". "I Caught Fire" is about "looking closely at a relationship that you kind of cherish", according to McCracken. McCracken said "All That I've Got" is about "moments in time. The more I've thought about living, I realize that our lives are made up of seconds and moments and memories". McCracken wrote "Hard to Say" about his ex-girlfriend Kate two years prior. Following her death, the group "decided for sure" about its inclusion on the album. McCracken added it "means a lot to me because of all the good times I shared with her". "Cut Up Angels" is about "a relationship with someone you love so much that you could absolutely kill them", according to McCracken. Discussing "Lunacy Fringe", McCracken said the track reminded him of "[the Cure's] 'Lovecats' meets [Soft Cell's] 'Tainted Love' a little bit".

== Release and promotion ==
On July 9, 2004, the band's second album announced for released late August under the rumoured title Light with a Sharpened Edge. The following week, it was clarified that the album would be titled In Love and Death. Between late July and early September, the band performed on the Projekt Revolution tour. During it, the band played "Take It Away" and "Listening". In early August, the band filmed a music video for "Take It Away" in Toronto with Motion Theory. On August 5, it was announced that the album's release date was pushed back to late September. A preview clip of "Take It Away" was posted online on August 12. "Take It Away" was released to radio on August 23, and on the iTunes Store the following day. On August 27, the album's track listing was revealed. On September 24, the band posted two songs on their PureVolume account: "Sound Effects and Overdramatics" and "I'm a Fake". In Love and Death was released on September 28 through Reprise Records. McCracken dedicated the album to his ex-girlfriend Kate, who had died during recording.

McCracken said the album's artwork features "blood hearts, weeping trees and bony monsters", which were drawn by Alex Pardee. The band were fans of his work and upon contacting him, he was enthusiastic about working with them. He visited the group, heard some of the songs and "didn't hold anything back. And that's why his artwork is so connected with these songs". Allman said the style of it was "really noisy and really splotchy. There's a lot of character and a lot of sweetness to it, but it's also plenty dark". To promote the album, the band appeared on Jimmy Kimmel Live!, and went on a series of in-store acoustic performances and signings. On October 6, the album was released in Japan with a bonus track, "The Back of Your Mouth". In October and November, the band went on a headlining tour of the US with Head Automatica, Atreyu, The Bronx, and The Bled supporting on select dates.

On November 16, the band filmed a music video for "All That I've Got" in Los Angeles with director Marc Webb. In early December, the band performed at Q101 Chicago's Xmas festival. "All That I've Got" was released as a single on December 7. The video for the track was later finished in January 2005. Later that month, the band went on a tour of the UK; Head Automatica was due to support but had cancelled due to illness. At the end of the tour, "Take It Away" was released as a single in the UK. Two versions with B-sides were released: one featuring live recordings of "The Taste of Ink" and Take It Away", while the other featured "All That I've Got". On February 12, "I Caught Fire" was released as a single. From mid-February to early April, the band headlined the Taste of Chaos tour in the US. On April 13, a cover of Queen and David Bowie's "Under Pressure" as a single, in which they collaborated with My Chemical Romance. The track was recorded to benefit victims of the 2004 tsunami in Asia. The album was re-released on May 10, with "Under Pressure" as a bonus track.

Following this, the band performed two shows in Australia and appeared at Download Festival. In late June, the band filmed a music video for "I Caught Fire" with director Kevin Kerslake in Los Angeles. The video was subsequently released on August 15. McCracken said that in contrast to the fairy-tale-esque video for "All That I've Got", the video for "I Caught Fire" had "a more straightforward approach" with the group "just kind of rock[ing] it out". MTV wrote that the video "intersperses footage of the Used performing in a 'shadowy, mysterious place' with artfully shot scenes of couples making out". In August and September, the band went on a headlining US tour with support from Thirty Seconds to Mars and Street Drum Corps. Glassjaw was also due to support but dropped off shortly before the tour began when their frontman fell ill. They were replaced by H_{2}O, though Glassjaw were able to appear on one of the dates later in the trek. In October and November, the band headlined the International Taste of Chaos tour which visited Mexico, Australia, Japan, the UK and Germany.

== Reception ==
Professional ratings
Aggregate scores
| Source | Rating |
|---|---|
| Metacritic | 64/100 |
Review scores
| Source | Rating |
| AllMusic | 2.5/5 stars |
| Alternative Press | 4/5 stars |
| BBC Music | Favorable |
| Billboard | Favorable |
| Blender | 4/5 stars |
| Entertainment Weekly | B |
| Exclaim! | Favorable |
| The Guardian | 3/5 stars |
| Melodic | 3/5 stars |
| Rolling Stone | 3/5 stars |

In Love and Death sold 93,240 copies in its first week, charting at number 6 on the Billboard 200. By February 2006, the album had sold over 642,000 copies. It was subsequently certified platinum in Canada and the US, certified gold in Australia, and certified silver in the UK. The album charted at number 4 in Canada, number 32 in Australia and number 106 in the UK. "Take It Away" charted at number 13 on the Alternative Songs chart and number 44 in the UK. "I Caught Fire" charted in at number 43 in Australia and number 191 in the UK. "All That I've Got" charted at number 19 on the Alternative Songs chart, number 35 in Australia and number 105 in the UK. "Under Pressure" charted at number 41 on the Billboard Hot 100 chart and number 28 on the Alternative Songs chart; it remains the band's only song to have charted on the Hot 100.

The album has been generally well received by critics. Billboard said that it "continues to straddle the line between street credibility and mainstream success". The Guardian gave it 3 out of 5 stars, saying "Songs of self-abuse and suicide - and those are the sunnier moments - are wrapped in wailing riffs, big choruses and fiddly guitar solos."

== Track listing ==
All songs written by the Used.

| No. | Title | Length |
|---|---|---|
| 1. | "Take It Away" | 3:37 |
| 2. | "I Caught Fire" | 3:24 |
| 3. | "Let It Bleed" | 3:10 |
| 4. | "All That I've Got" | 3:58 |
| 5. | "Cut Up Angels" | 3:47 |
| 6. | "Listening" | 2:46 |
| 7. | "Yesterday's Feelings" | 2:48 |
| 8. | "Light with a Sharpened Edge" | 3:30 |
| 9. | "Sound Effects and Overdramatics (feat. Sean Ingram of Coalesce)" | 3:28 |
| 10. | "Hard to Say" | 3:29 |
| 11. | "Lunacy Fringe" | 3:40 |
| 12. | "I'm a Fake" | 4:06 |
| Total length: | | 41:43 |

Japanese bonus track
| No. | Title | Length |
|---|---|---|
| 13. | "The Back of Your Mouth" | 3:20 |

Reissue bonus track
| No. | Title | Length |
|---|---|---|
| 13. | "Under Pressure" (Queen cover; with My Chemical Romance) | 3:32 |

=== Additional track information ===
The Used recorded 15 songs during the In Love and Death recording session. The three b-sides from the session are titled "The Back of Your Mouth", "Into My Web" and "Under Pressure". "The Back of Your Mouth" was released as a bonus track in Japan only and later on Shallow Believer, "Under Pressure" was released as a digital single on iTunes in 2005 with My Chemical Romance, then added to physical CD reissues and the 2009 and 2025 reissue on vinyl and "Into My Web" was released on Shallow Believer.

== Personnel ==
Personnel per booklet.

The Used

- Bert McCracken – lead vocals, keyboards, piano, string arrangement
- Quinn Allman – guitars, backing vocals, toys
- Branden Steineckert – drums, backing vocals, percussion, additional programming on "Take It Away"
- Jeph Howard – bass, backing vocals, fusion

Additional musicians

- Sean Ingram – additional vocals on "Sound Effects and Overdramatics"
- Danny Lohner – additional programming on "Take It Away"
- Josh Eustis – additional programming on "Take It Away"

Production

- John Feldmann – producer, engineer, mixing, string arrangement
- Mark Blewett – assistant engineer, bass tech, guitar tech
- Alan Hessler – assistant engineer, bass tech, guitar tech
- Anthony Catalano – digital editing
- Joe Gastwirt – mastering
- Alex Pardee – art, design
- Seth Smoot – photography
- Daniel Jensen – drum tech
- Jordan Brown – drum tech
- Brian Patchett – bass tech, guitar tech

== Charts ==
Chart performance for In Love and Death
| Chart (2004–2005) | Peak position |
|---|---|
| Australian Albums (ARIA) | 32 |
| Canadian Albums (Billboard) | 4 |
| Dutch Albums (Album Top 100) | 100 |
| Japanese Albums (Oricon) | 33 |
| UK Albums (OCC) | 106 |
| UK Rock & Metal Albums (Official Charts) | 6 |
| US Billboard 200 | 6 |

== Certifications ==
Certifications for In Love and Death
| Region | Certification | Certified units/sales |
|---|---|---|
| Australia (ARIA) | Gold | 35,000^{^} |
| Canada (Music Canada) | Platinum | 100,000^{‡} |
| United Kingdom (BPI) | Silver | 60,000^{^} |
| United States (RIAA) | Platinum | 1,000,000^{‡} |
^{^} Shipments figures based on certification alone.^{‡} Sales+streaming figures based on certification alone.
