= The Bird and the Worm =

Single by the Used

from the album Lies for the Liars
- Released: March 20, 2007
- Studio: 2007
- Genre: Emo
- Length: 3:46
- Label: Reprise
- Songwriters: Quinn Allman; Jeph Howard; Bert McCracken
- Producer: John Feldmann

The Used singles chronology
"Under Pressure" (2005)	"The Bird and the Worm" (2007)	"Pretty Handsome Awkward" (2007)

"The Bird and the Worm" is a song by the Used, released as the first single from their third studio album, Lies for the Liars. The song impacted radio on April 3, 2007. It is their highest charting single to date, peaking at number 9 on the Billboard Modern Rock Tracks chart and number 7 on the Billboard Bubbling Under Hot 100 Singles chart, equaling number 107 on the U.S. Hot 100 (their second single to make it into the Billboard singles chart). It received moderate video play on MTV and other music channels. The song is about Bert McCracken's brother, who is suffering from schizophrenia.

The track contains what is described as "evil laugher" by Loudwire.

== Track listings ==
- All songs written by the Used.

=== CD single ===
No.	Title	Length
1.	"The Bird and the Worm"	3:46
2.	"Dark Days"	3:49
3.	"Devil Beside You"	3:45

=== 7-inch picture disc ===
No.	Title	Length
1.	"The Bird and the Worm"	3:46
2.	"Dark Days"	3:49

=== 2010 digital download ===
In 2010, a three-track version appeared on digital music stores featuring three versions of the song.

No.	Title	Length
1.	"The Bird and the Worm (album version)"	3:46
2.	"The Bird and the Worm (a cappella)"	3:41
3.	"The Bird and the Worm (instrumental)"	3:46

== Music video ==
The video was filmed in Toronto, Canada on April 1–2, 2007. The video, which was directed by Lisa Mann, premiered on Monday, April 23, 2007 on MTV2 in the U.S. as part of their Unleashed program. The video is not available on MTV2.com by UK residents. UK TV channel Scuzz is now showing an edited version of the video; it only has a brief moment at the start through the key hole and then cuts out the sequence with Bert being stabbed in the wrist and then it healing itself. The part where Bert coughs up blood after drowning in the couch has also been cut. It also cuts out the part where Jeph offers Bert a lamb's head on a plate.

== In other media ==
The song was used in CBS' Moonlight for their fifth episode, and an orchestral cover was used in the trailer for the 2010 remake of Clash of the Titans. It was also played during Francesca Jones's rhythmic gymnastics routine at the 2012 London Olympics.

== Charts ==
=== Weekly charts ===
Weekly chart performance for "The Bird and the Worm"
Chart (2007)	Peak position
Australia (ARIA)	35
Scotland Singles (OCC)	54
UK Singles (OCC)	130
UK Rock & Metal (OCC)	4
US Bubbling Under Hot 100 (Billboard)	7
US Alternative Airplay (Billboard)	9
US Pop 100 (Billboard)	92

=== Year-end charts ===
Year-end chart performance for "The Bird and the Worm"
Chart (2007)	Position
US Alternative Songs (Billboard)	33
