= Pretty Handsome Awkward =

Single by The Used

from the album Lies for the Liars and Transformers: The Album
- Released: September 10, 2007
- Recorded: 2007
- Genre: Screamo; post-hardcore; alternative metal
- Length: 3:32
- Label: Reprise
- Songwriters: Quinn Allman; Jeph Howard; Bert McCracken
- Producer: John Feldmann

The Used singles chronology
"The Bird and the Worm" (2007)	"Pretty Handsome Awkward" (2007)	"Blood on My Hands" (2009)

"Pretty Handsome Awkward" is the second single from the Used's third studio album, Lies for the Liars. The song was released to US alternative radio on August 21, 2007 and released to UK radio on September 3. The song is perhaps best known for being played during a chase scene in Michael Bay's film Transformers and is also featured on the soundtrack as well as a downloadable track on Guitar Hero III: Legends of Rock. The single peaked at No. 37 on the US Alternative Airplay. It was rumored that the track was written about My Chemical Romance frontman Gerard Way, but Bert McCracken said that this is not true. It is also used as the official goal theme for the NHL’s Utah Mammoth.

== Track listings ==
=== CD single ===
No.	Title	Length
1.	"Pretty Handsome Awkward"	3:35
2.	"Slit Your Own Throat"	3:04

=== DVD single ===
No.	Title	Length
1.	"Pretty Handsome Awkward" (audio)	3:34
2.	"Devil Beside You" (audio)	3:45
3.	"Pretty Handsome Awkward" (video)	3:42
4.	"Webclips 1–4" (video)	10:31
5.	"Sizzle Reel" (video)	1:19

=== 7-inch picture disc ===
No.	Title	Length
1.	"Pretty Handsome Awkward"	3:36
2.	"Devil Beside You"	3:45

== Music video ==
The video starts with footage from the 2007 MuchMusic Video Awards of the band and Chadam walking down the street, with screaming fans on the sidewalks, and an interviewer asks "You guys gonna get all wasted tonight? Up to your normal antics?" Bert responds, "Nah, we're a little partied out, we'll probably try to take, take it easy and chill out afterward," after which a huge party is shown with the aforementioned antics being performed throughout. Jeph Howard also appears as a cross-dressed prostitute in the video. In one of the videos, he flashes the camera. At the end, the piece of dialogue at the beginning is repeated with this added afterward by the reporter: "What are you guys wusses or somethin'?".

== Charts ==
Chart (2007)	Peak position
Scotland (OCC)	75
UK Physical Singles (OCC)	66
US Alternative Airplay (Billboard)	37
