= I Caught Fire =

2005 single by the Used

Single by the Used

from the album In Love and Death
- Released: February 12, 2005
- Genre: Emo
- Length: 3:26
- Label: Reprise
- Songwriters: Bert McCracken; Quinn Allman; Jeph Howard; Branden Steineckert
- Producer: John Feldmann

The Used singles chronology
"All That I've Got" (2004)	"I Caught Fire" (2005)	"Under Pressure" (2005)

"I Caught Fire" is the third single from American rock band the Used's second studio album, In Love and Death (2004). It was released to radio in February 2005.

== Track listing ==
CD single

All tracks are written by the Used, except for "Alone This Holiday", written by the Used and John Feldmann.

No.	Title	Length
1.	"I Caught Fire"	3:26
2.	"The Taste of Ink" (live from Channel V Australia)	3:51
3.	"All That I've Got" (acoustic version)	3:36
4.	"Lunacy Fringe" (acoustic version)	3:34
5.	"Alone This Holiday"	2:55

== Personnel ==
The Used

- Bert McCracken – vocals
- Quinn Allman – guitar
- Jeph Howard – bass
- Branden Steineckert – drums

== Charts ==
Weekly chart performance for "I Caught Fire"
Chart (2005)	Peak position
Australia (ARIA)	43
UK Singles (Official Charts)	191
UK Rock & Metal (Official Charts)	9
