= Take It Away (The Used song) =

Single by the Used

from the album In Love and Death
- Released: August 31, 2004
- Recorded: 2004
- Studio: Foxy Studios in Los Angeles, California, US
- Genre: Emo; post-hardcore
- Length: 3:37
- Label: Reprise
- Songwriters: Bert McCracken; Quinn Allman; Jeph Howard; Branden Steineckert
- Producer: John Feldmann

The Used singles chronology
"Blue and Yellow" (2003)	"Take It Away" (2004)	"All That I've Got" (2004)

"Take It Away" is the first single from the Used's second studio album In Love and Death. "Take It Away" was released to radio on August 31, 2004. This song, as well as video, was played during the commercials to promote the album.

== Track listings ==
- All songs written by the Used.

=== CD single 1 ===
No.	Title	Length
1.	"Take It Away"	3:38
2.	"All That I've Got" (Live at Soma)	4:07

=== CD single 2 ===
No.	Title	Length
1.	"Take It Away"	3:38
2.	"The Taste of Ink" (Live at Soma)	4:27
3.	"Take It Away" (Live at Soma)	4:08

=== 7-inch vinyl ===
No.	Title	Length
1.	"Take It Away"	3:38
2.	"All That I've Got" (Live at Soma)	4:07

== Personnel ==
The Used

- Bert McCracken - vocals
- Quinn Allman - guitar
- Jeph Howard - bass
- Branden Steineckert - drums

== Charts ==
Chart performance
Chart (2004–2005)	Peak position
Scottish Singles Sales (Official Charts)	43
UK Singles (Official Charts)	44
UK Rock & Metal (Official Charts)	4
US Alternative Airplay (Billboard)	13
