= All That I've Got (The Used song) =

Single by the Used

from the album In Love and Death
- Released: December 7, 2004
- Studio: Foxy (Los Angeles)
- Genre: Emo
- Length: 3:59
- Label: Reprise
- Songwriters: Bert McCracken; Quinn Allman; Jeph Howard; Branden Steineckert
- Producer: John Feldmann

The Used singles chronology
"Take It Away" (2004)	"All That I've Got" (2004)	"I Caught Fire" (2005)

"All That I've Got" is a song by American rock band the Used, released as the second single from their second studio album, In Love and Death (2004), in December 2004. The song was dedicated to Bert McCracken's dog, David Bowie, who was hit by a truck during the making of the album. An acoustic version was later released on iTunes.

== Meaning ==
The song is about lead singer Bert McCracken's girlfriend dying of an overdose while pregnant. It is also believed to be partially inspired by the death of his pet dog in the month after this.

== Track listings ==
CD single 1

All tracks are written by the Used.

No.	Title	Length
1.	"All That I've Got"	3:59
2.	"I'm a Fake" (Live at Soma)	4:22

CD single 2

No.	Title	Length
1.	"All That I've Got"	3:59
2.	"A Box Full of Sharp Objects" (Live at Soma)	2:59
3.	"I Caught Fire (Live at Soma)"	3:40

== Personnel ==
The Used

- Bert McCracken – vocals
- Quinn Allman – guitar
- Jeph Howard – bass
- Branden Steineckert – drums

== Charts ==
=== Weekly charts ===
Weekly chart performance for "All That I've Got"
Chart (2005)	Peak position
Australia (ARIA)	35
Scotland Singles (Official Charts)	66
UK Singles (Official Charts)	105
UK Rock & Metal (Official Charts)	6
US Alternative Airplay (Billboard)	19

=== Year-end charts ===
Year-end chart performance for "All That I've Got"
Chart (2005)	Position
US Modern Rock Tracks (Billboard)	65

== Acoustic version ==
An acoustic version of "All That I've Got" was released on iTunes on June 28, 2005, the same day as the acoustic version of "Lunacy Fringe".
